= Pentax cameras =

History aspect of camera brand

This article discusses the cameras – mainly 35 mm SLRs – manufactured by Pentax (ペンタックス, Pentakkusu) Ricoh Imaging Corp. and its predecessors, Pentax Corporation (ペンタックス株式会社, Pentakkusu Kabushiki-gaisha) and Asahi Optical Co., Ltd. (旭光学工業株式会社, Asahi Kōgaku Kōgyō Kabushiki-gaisha). Pentax must not be confused with Pentax 6x7 or Pentax 67 which are 120 medium format 6x7cm film cameras.

It covers from the first "Asahiflex" models in 1952 and their successor, the pivotal "Asahi Pentax" single-lens reflex camera, last made in 1997, to the present time known as "Pentax" first made in 1981.

== Background ==
The period around 1950 marked the return of the Japanese photographic industry to the vigorous level of the early 1940s, and its emergence as a major exporter. The newly reborn industry had sold many of its cameras to the occupation forces (with hugely more disposable income than the Japanese) and they were well received. The Korean War saw a huge influx of journalists and photographers to the Far East, where they were impressed by lenses from companies such as Nikon and Canon for their Leica rangefinder cameras, and also by bodies by these and other companies to supplement and replace the Leica and Contax cameras they were using. This was the background to the development of Asahi Optical's first camera.

== Timeline of innovation ==
- 1952: The first Japanese SLR (Asahiflex)
- 1954: The world's first instant return mirror system (Asahiflex IIb) in a pentaprism SLR
- 1966: Asahi is the world's first camera manufacturer to produce one million SLRs (after only in 14 years of manufacturing)
- 1967: Opening of the first camera museum in Japan owned by a camera manufacturer located at Nishiazabu, Tokyo (moved to Mashiko plant in 1993)
- 1971: The world's first SLR camera with a TTL automatic-exposure control. This camera was the Pentax ES
- 1971: The world's first Super Multi-Coated lenses (Takumar lens series)
- 1976: The world's first gallium arsenide light meter in a SLR (developed in conjunction with Nippon electronics)
- 1976: The smallest and lightest 35mm full-frame SLR camera (Pentax MX and ME)
- 1979: The world's first camera to incorporate the concept of push-button shutter speed control. This camera was the Pentax ME Super
- 1980: The world's first through-the-lens autofocus camera. This camera was the Pentax ME F
- 1981: The first camera manufacturer to reach the production milestone of 10 million SLR cameras (Asahi Optical)
- 1984: The world's first multi-mode medium format camera. This camera was the Pentax 645
- 1987: The first 35mm SLR camera to feature a built-in TTL auto flash (SF-1)
- 1991: The world's first weather-resistant zoom compact camera is launched. That camera was the "PENTAX ZOOM 90WR"
- 1995: The world's smallest autofocus SLR camera designed based on the concept of "intuitive operation" is launched. That camera was the PENTAX MZ-5
- 1997: The world's first autofocus medium format SLR camera. That camera was the Pentax 645N
- 2008: The world's smallest digital SLR camera equipped with an image sensor equivalent to the APS-C size format is launched. That camera was the PENTAX K-m
- 2010: The world's first to introduce a digital medium format SLR camera. That camera was the Pentax 645D
- 2011: The world's smallest and lightest interchangeable lens camera (ILC) in a body significantly smaller than every other digital ILC body available on the market. That camera was the Pentax Q
- 2012: The world's first medium format DSLR without IR cut filter especially for research, archival, and law enforcement use. This camera was the 645D IR
- 2012: The first mirrorless camera to natively support a SLR lens lineup. This camera was the K-01
- 2014: The world's first to achieve a score above 100 at DxO. The camera was the 645Z with a 101 DxO score
- 2016: Pentax was the first to introduce a weather resistant and backside illuminated flexible tilt type LCD monitor with their first professional full frame DSLR. This camera was the Pentax K-1
- 2023: Pentax announced they are developing a new 35mm film camera under the project title Pentax Film Camera Project, although it appears to have been canceled.
- 2024: Pentax releases a new compact film camera, the Pentax 17. Camera uses 35mm film and takes pictures in half-frame format

== Screw mount cameras ==
=== Asahiflex Series ===
Asahi Optical introduced its first 35 mm camera in 1952. Asahi was unusual in deciding to start with a high-quality 35mm camera that was not a copy of something else. Its designers were convinced of the inherent superiority of the SLR and so proceeded along these lines. This effort resulted in the Asahiflex I, which was also the first Japanese 35mm SLR.

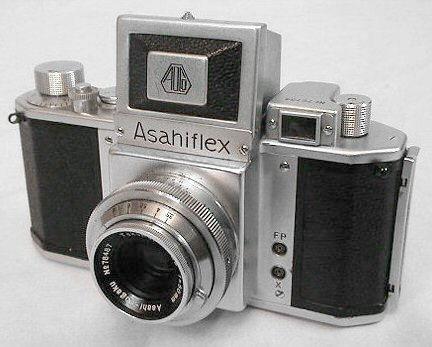
Asahiflex IIb

There has always been a close design relationship between the products of Asahi, and those made in Germany (and later East Germany) by a variety of manufacturers, most notably Zeiss Ikon. In the case of the Asahiflex, study should be made of the immediate pre-war and immediate post-war models of the Praktiflex, which could be properly called the inspiration for the Asahiflex. This is, however, not very likely, since the cameras are very different in mechanical construction and form, although the specifications show many similarities. According to other sources, it was a pre-war Reflex Corelle, owned by president Mr. Matsumoto, that inspired the Asahiflex. The camera was designed by two engineers who had previously worked at Konishi (Konica).

The Asahiflex I had a non-interchangeable waist-level viewfinder, with a direct optical viewfinder for eye-level use. The Asahiflex I had a non-returning mirror and shutter speeds from 1/25 to 1/500. The camera used the M37 screw mount. It went through some minor modifications for flash use, resulting in the IA. With the IIB a key advance was made: the quick-return mirror. The problem of mirror black-out was one of the main problems with prior SLR designs, greatly reducing usability and a major reason for the greater popularity of the rangefinder. With the IIB there emerged the first practical quick-return mirror, a vital innovation and one which was quickly adopted by other manufacturers. With the final model in the series, the IIA, the Asahiflex gained slow speeds from 1/25th of a second to 1/2 of a second.

- Asahiflex I (1952–1953)
- Asahiflex IA (1953–1954)
- Asahiflex IIB (1954–1956)
- Asahiflex IIA (1955–1957)

=== Asahi-Pentax Series (pre Spotmatic) ===
A recognized problem with the Asahiflex series was that, lacking a pentaprism, it was very difficult to use the camera in a vertical position and taking pictures of moving objects was almost impossible. The small viewfinder on top of the camera was of little use when the photographer wanted to use a 135 mm or 500 mm lens. The problem was recognized by Asahi. In 1957, Asahi introduced the Pentax series, a 35 mm single-lens reflex camera (SLR) camera which was so well received that it influenced the design of 35 mm SLRs worldwide for years to come. The Pentax and its later development and likewise classic 1964 Pentax Spotmatic spurred the development of Asahi into a photographic multinational company, eventually renaming itself "Pentax" after its seminal product. The Pentax series remains pivotal in the development of modern SLR photography.

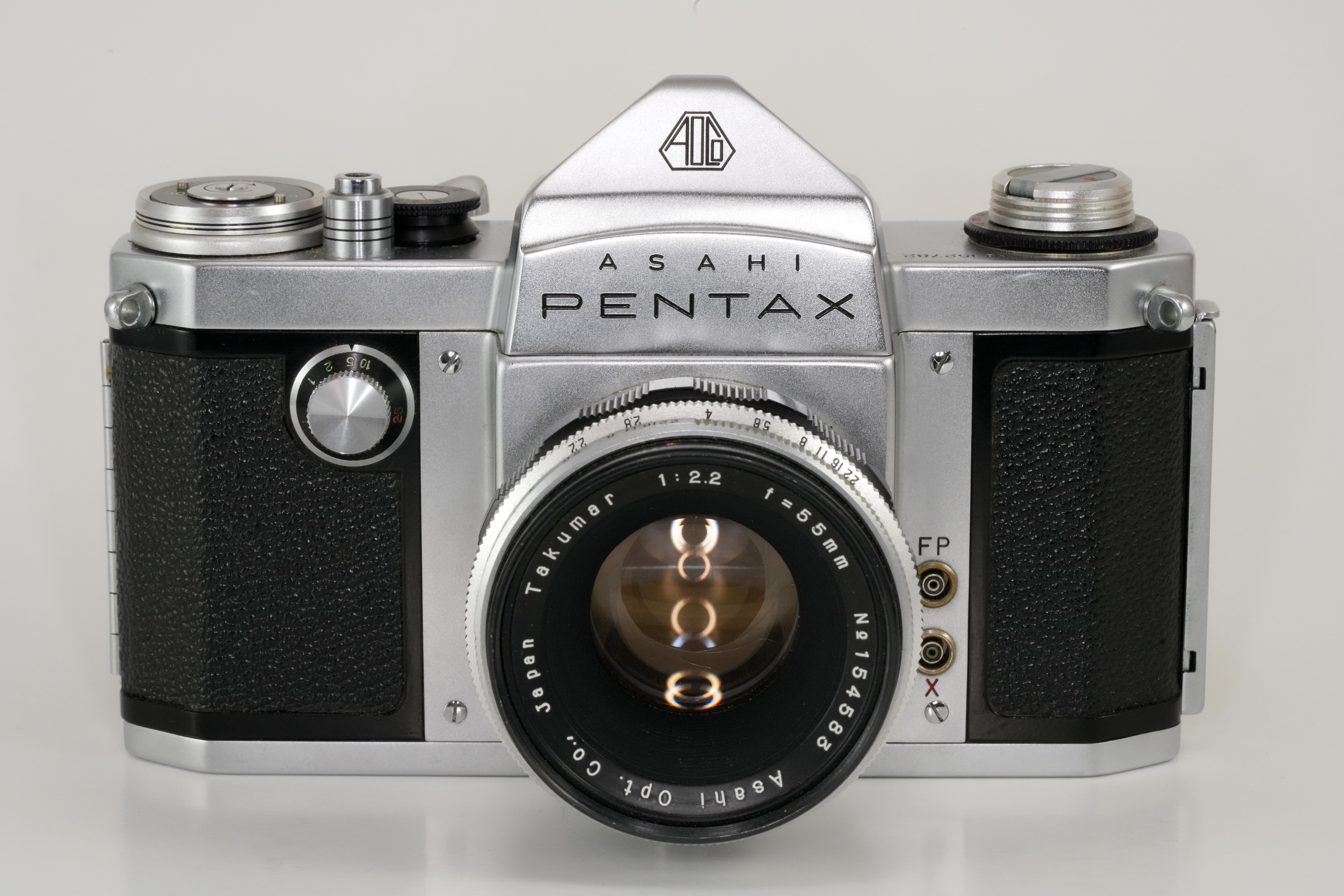
1957, Asahi Pentax

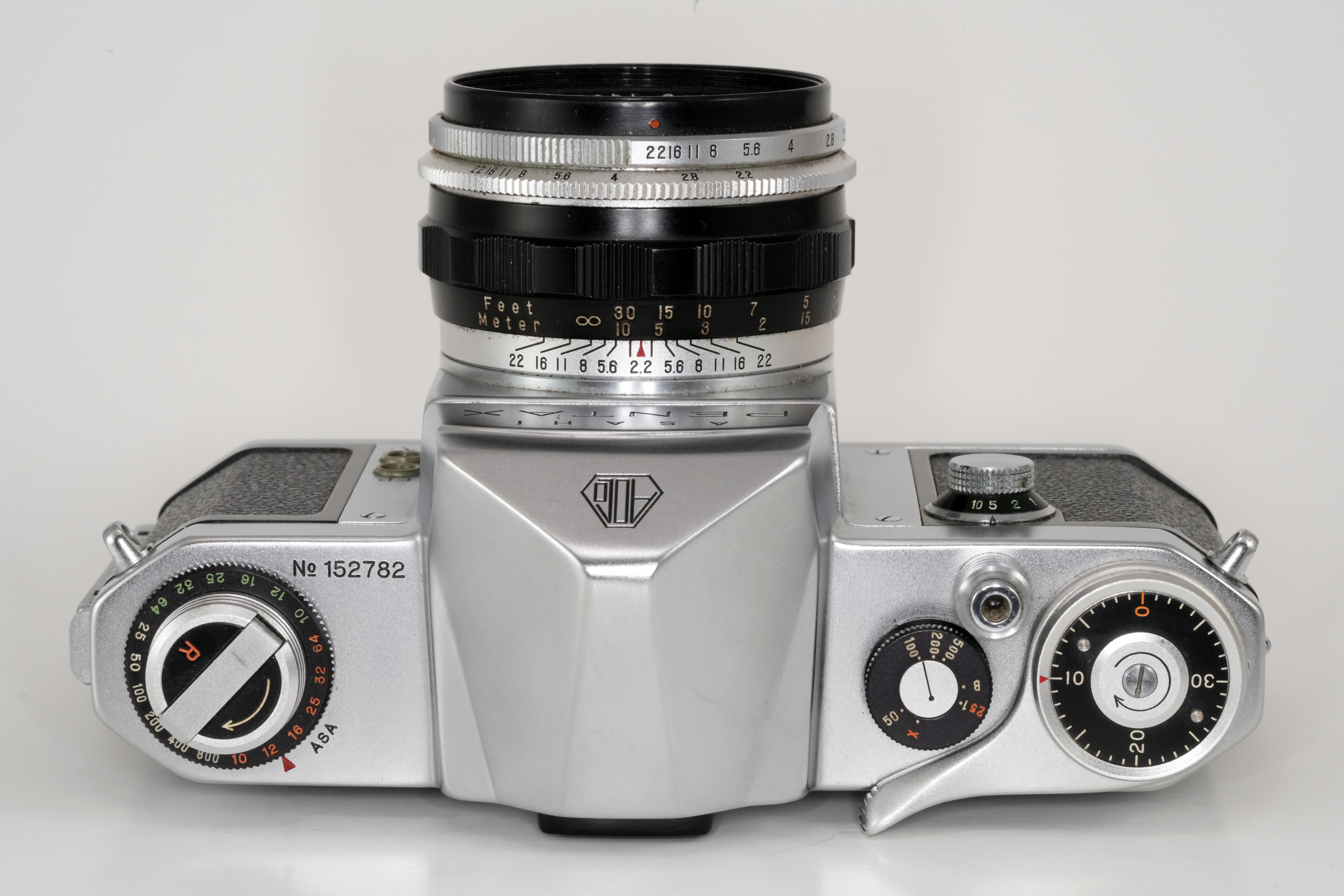
1957, Asahi Pentax, top view

There is some confusion about the etymology of the name. Most sources claim it was licensed from VEB Pentacon the East German successor to Zeiss Ikon, and is derived from the combination "PENTaprism" and "contAX", in the same way that "Pentacon" was taken from "PENTAprism" and "CONtax". It's known that the "Pentax" name was originally registered as a trademark by VEB Pentacon, duly noting that both the M42 lens mount and the first recognizably modern 35mm SLR camera, the Contax D, were products of the East German branch of Zeiss Ikon, circa 1949. The name actually comes from a contraction of PENTAprism and AsahifleX. This was confirmed by the international sales department of Asahi Optical Co. in 1999.

The Asahi Pentax of 1957 featured:

- Pentaprism
- Rapid-wind film advance lever. Earlier 35 mm SLRs, with the exception of Exakta's left-handed lever, and the Edixa Reflex, had knob advance.
- Film rewind crank, likewise a first for 35 mm SLRs.
- Instant mirror return, unique to the Pentax and its immediate predecessor, the Asahiflex IIb
- Microprism focusing aids on the focus screen, unique to the Pentax

Moreover, the Pentax placed controls in locations that would become standard on 35 mm SLRs from all manufacturers, such as the right-handed rapid wind lever, the bottom right mounted rewind release, and film speed reminder around the film rewind crank.

The photographic giants Canon & Nikon, did not introduce their own SLR cameras until 1959 with the Canonflex and the F-series respectively. By contrast, the Pentax series offered these features at a relatively low price, introducing many photographers to 35 mm SLR photography.

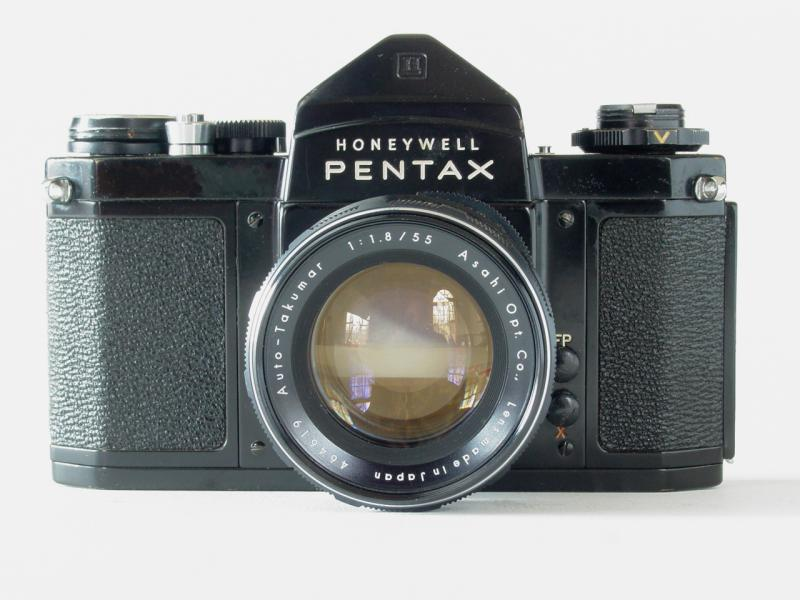
Honeywell H3V

The Asahi Pentax series went through various iterations until 1964. Each successive model incorporated minor improvements, the most noticeable being the incorporation of the two shutter speed dials (one for high speeds and one for low speeds) into one. The AP of 1957 is externally almost identical to the 1964 SV.

=== Spotmatic Series ===
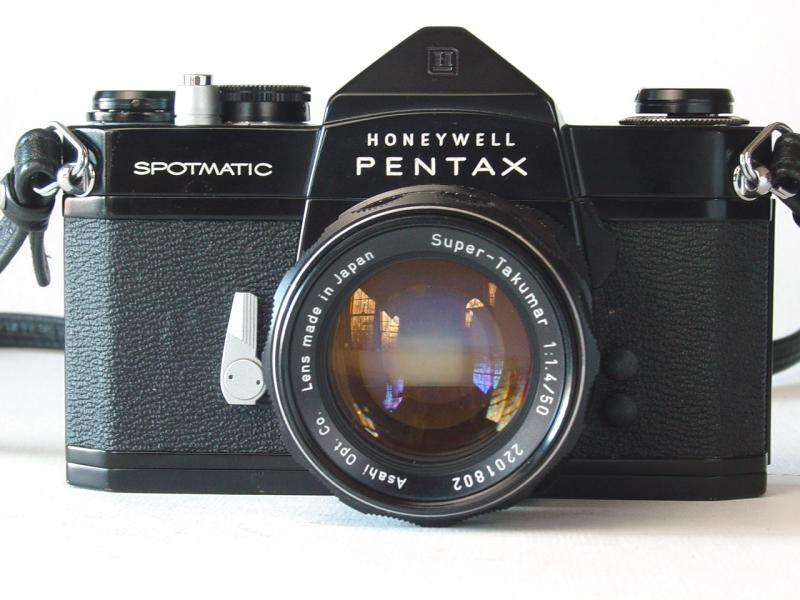
Spotmatic with Super-Takumar 1:1.4 50mm lens

However, by the 1960s the clamour for in-camera exposure metering was rising. It was possible to attach an external CdS (Cadmium sulfide) exposure meter to the later AP-derived models, but in 1960 the next breakthrough arrived. At the 1960 photokina camera show, Asahi exhibited the Spot-matic prototype. This camera took exposure measurements, via a spotmeter, through the taking lens, an incredible innovation. The camera excited tremendous attention and in 1964 the first production Spotmatic (hyphen dropped) emerged. The Spotmatic was virtually identical to the prototype; however, the spotmeter was replaced with an all-over average-reading exposure meter in order to give more consistent results. The camera was an instant success and was snapped up by the thousands, although Asahi had been beaten into production by the Topcon RE Super which went on sale in April 1963; the Topcon failed to attract the same degree of commercial success. The Spotmatic was replaced by the Spotmatic II with many upgrades 1971 – 1976.

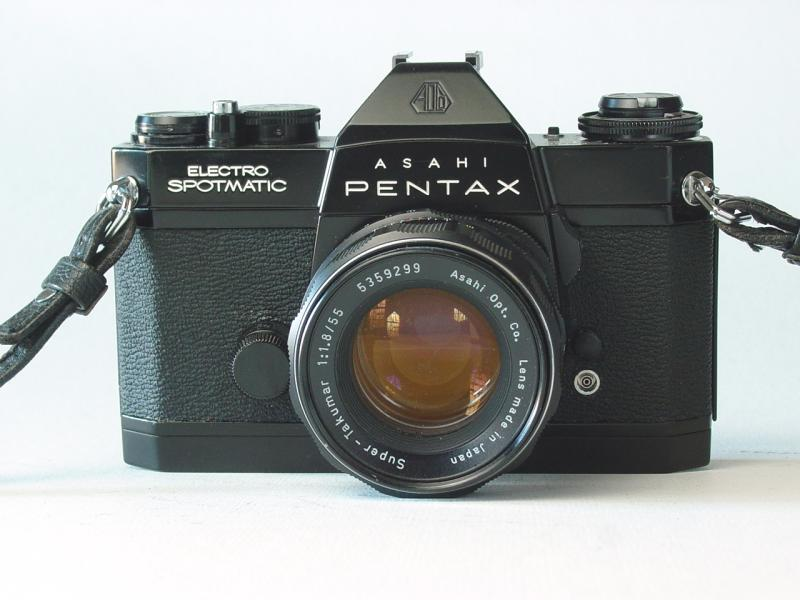
Electro-Spotmatic with Super-Takumar 1:1.8 55mm lens

In 1966 Asahi Optical had produced one million SLR cameras since the first Asahiflex of 1962. It took them only another three years, until 1969, to reach two million. This period was a time of complete pre-eminence for Asahi Optical. During the Spotmatic era Asahi were manufacturing more SLRs per month than all the other camera manufacturers combined. One of the technological highlights was the Electro-Spotmatic of 1971. This camera was one of the first to incorporate automatic exposure. The series concluded in 1973 with the introduction of the Spotmatic F (now incorporating open-aperture metering rather than the stop-down metering of the early models).

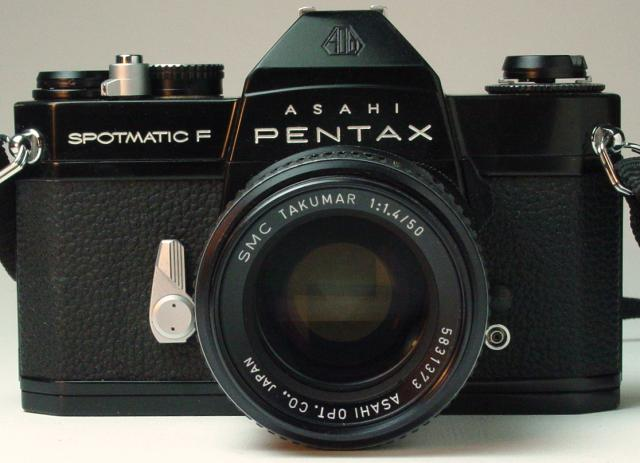
Spotmatic F with SMC Takumar 1:1.4 50mm lens

However, by the mid-1970s the limitations of the M42 mount were being felt. By this time most other manufacturers had opted for a bayonet lens mount. It was a great step for Asahi Optical to take but the M42 screw mount, by now widely known as 'Pentax screw mount', had reached the end of its useful life. Pentax were now to adopt the K-mount that would see them through the next 40 years.

=== Other prototypes ===
In 1960, the same year that Asahi Optical introduced the Spot-matic prototype at photokina, they also showed another SLR prototype which they called the Metallica. The Metallica gave a glimpse into the future direction of Pentax cameras; it featured a prototype bayonet lens mount, a vertical-traveling, metallic Copal-type focal plane shutter (from which the camera drew its name), and an already obsolescent coupled selenium light meter. The light meter was not TTL, but instead featured the typical large selenium mini-lens pattern on the front of the pentaprism. Otherwise the camera resembled the Spot-matic in appearance. While Asahi Optical didn't put the Metallica into production, the concepts of a bayonet lens mount and a metal focal plane shutter were already being discussed internally at the company.

In 1966 Asahi Optical showed another prototype called Metallica, sometimes referred to as Metallica II. Gone was the cumbersome selenium light meter, replaced with a now standard internal CdS meter. Like the 1960 prototype, the Metallica had a bayonet lens mount, and also featured an improved Copal-square metallic shutter. But the biggest innovation was the fully automatic shutter operation coupled to the TTL meter. The metering system, for the first time in a 35mm SLR, controlled the shutter speed automatically based on the aperture set. With these innovative developments, the Metallica pioneered features that would not surface on Pentax production cameras until the Electro-Spotmatic (ES) (automatic aperture-priority exposure) in 1971, ES II in 1973 and K2 (vertical metal shutter, bayonet lens mount, automatic aperture-priority exposure) in 1975. (Cecchi 1991:80–86)

== K Mount cameras ==
=== K Series ===
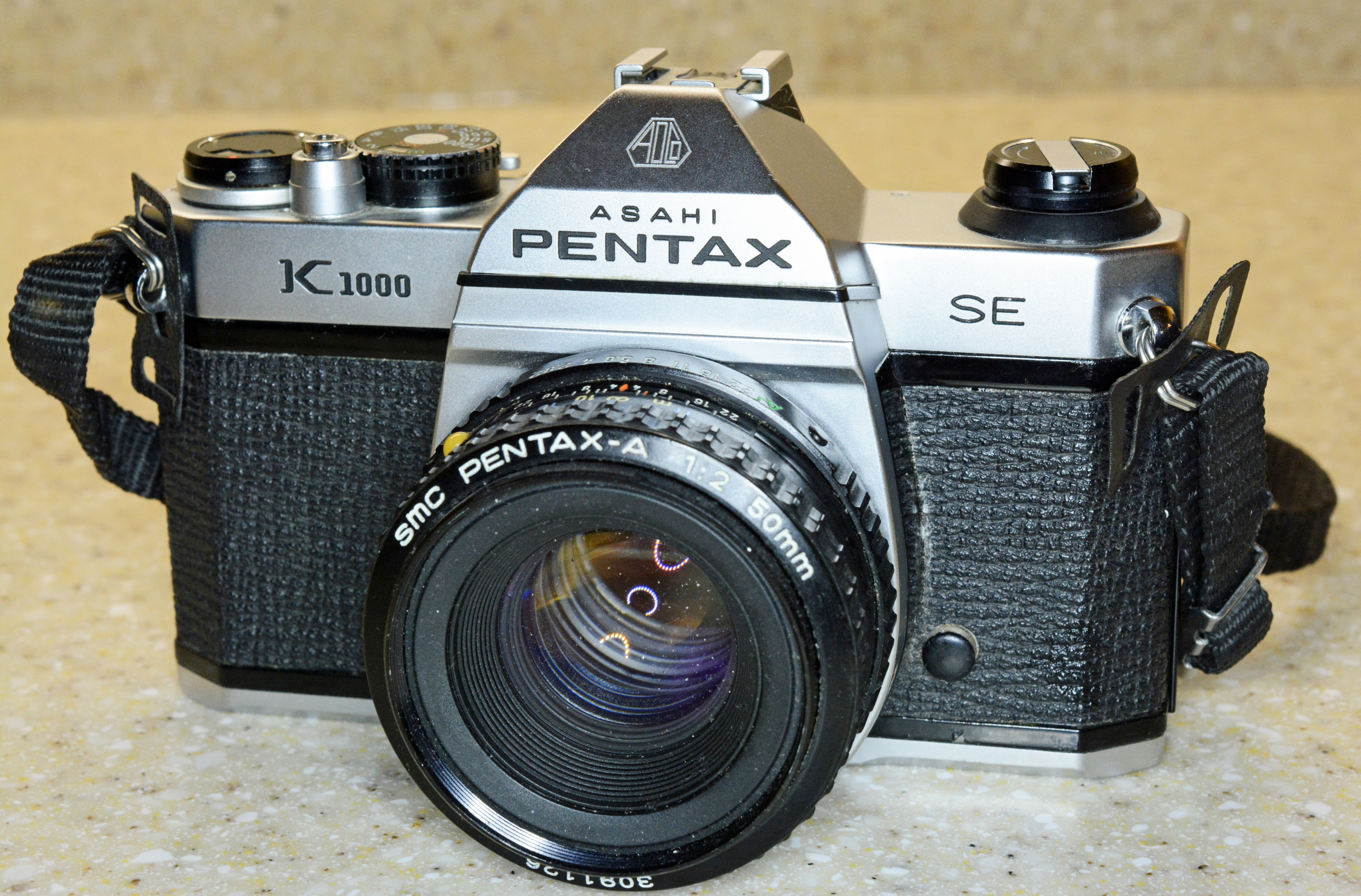
A Pentax K1000 SE with a SMC 50 mm f/2 lens

- K2 (1975–1980)
- K2 DMD (1976–1980)
- KX (1975–1977)
- KM (1975–1977)
- K1000 (1976–1997)

Three new models were introduced at once in 1975: the K2, KX and KM. The K2 DMD and K1000 followed in 1976. What set these cameras apart from earlier Pentax ones was the replacement of the M42 "universal" screw-lens mount with a proprietary bayonet mount system, known as the K mount. Still the basis for Pentax lenses and cameras today, the K mount offered greater convenience and enabled the production of faster lenses such as the 50 mm f/1.2. To keep M42 users in the Pentax system, an M42-K Mount adaptor was offered, enabling them to continue to use their existing lenses, albeit with the loss of automation and needing to accept "stop-down" metering, which causes the viewfinder's image to brighten or darken whenever the aperture's f/stop is changed.

The K series cameras followed the design ethos of the previous Pentax Spotmatic series cameras, which were large and heavy, although rugged. But by 1975 there was already a general move to smaller 35mm cameras, led by the Olympus OM-1, so even as the K series was introduced Pentax were working on a new camera line, the M Series which started to appear in 1976. All except the K1000 therefore had relatively short production lives as the M Series took over the Pentax mid-range.

The KM, the cheapest of the original three cameras, was almost identical to the Spotmatic F except for the K mount and the top plate cosmetics. It used a rather dated and slow CdS (cadmium sulfide) photocell for metering. The KX featured a better light meter using SPD (silicon photodiodes), visible aperture and shutter speeds in the viewfinder, and a mirror lock-up mechanism. The K2, the original flagship model, incorporated aperture-priority autoexposure with a fully manually selectable range of shutter speeds from 8s to 1/1000. The only other aperture priority camera Pentax had made up to this point, the ES series, only had manual shutter speeds from 1/60 upwards. The K2 DMD was a special version of the K2 that could use a data back and motor drive (hence "DMD"), together with other enhancements that aimed it at the professional market. The K1000 was the KM without the self-timer, depth of field preview and some other facilities, and was aimed at the lower end of the market in which it was very successful and continued in production until 1997, helped by the fact that for many years it was the camera usually recommended for students starting photographic or art courses.

=== M Series ===
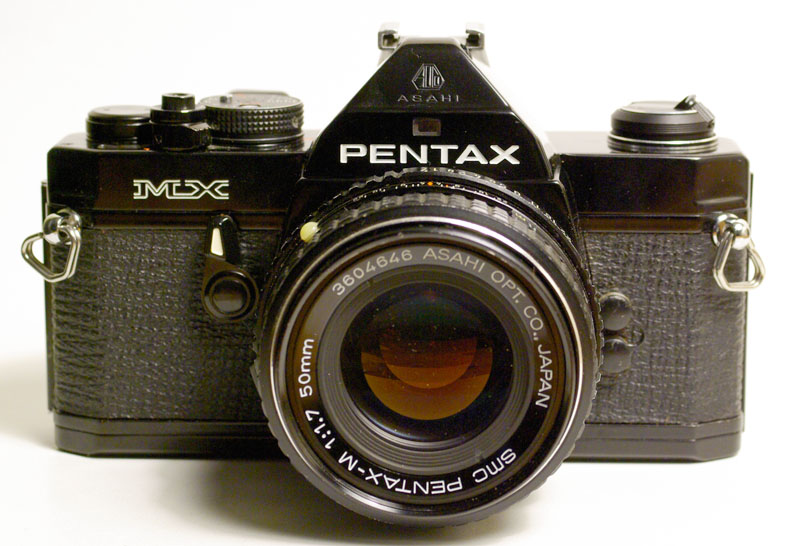
Pentax MX

The M series cameras were noted for their compact size, and are among the smallest 35 mm SLRs ever made, though they are quite heavy when compared to the plastic SLRs of the 1990s. Except for the MX, all were based on the same basic camera body, and featured aperture-priority exposure automation. While superficially resembling the ME, the MX was designed as a manual-only SLR system targeted to the advanced amateur or professional photographer, and had its own set of accessories that were mostly incompatible with the other M series cameras. Conversely, the other M-series cameras were targeted squarely at casual users. None of the M-series, with the exception of the MX, featured a depth of field preview.

The ME featured aperture-priority only automation with no manual override. The MX was entirely manual and resembled the earlier KX in features. The ME Super was an ME with a manual mode. The MG, MV, and MV1 were even simpler versions of the original ME.

The ME-F was an early attempt at an autofocus SLR using a special 35-70mm zoom with a motor built into the lens.

- ME (1976–1980)
- MX (1976–1985)
- ME Super (1979–1984)
- MV (1979–1982)
- MV1 (1979–1982)
- ME F (1981–1988)
- MG (1982–1985)

=== LX ===
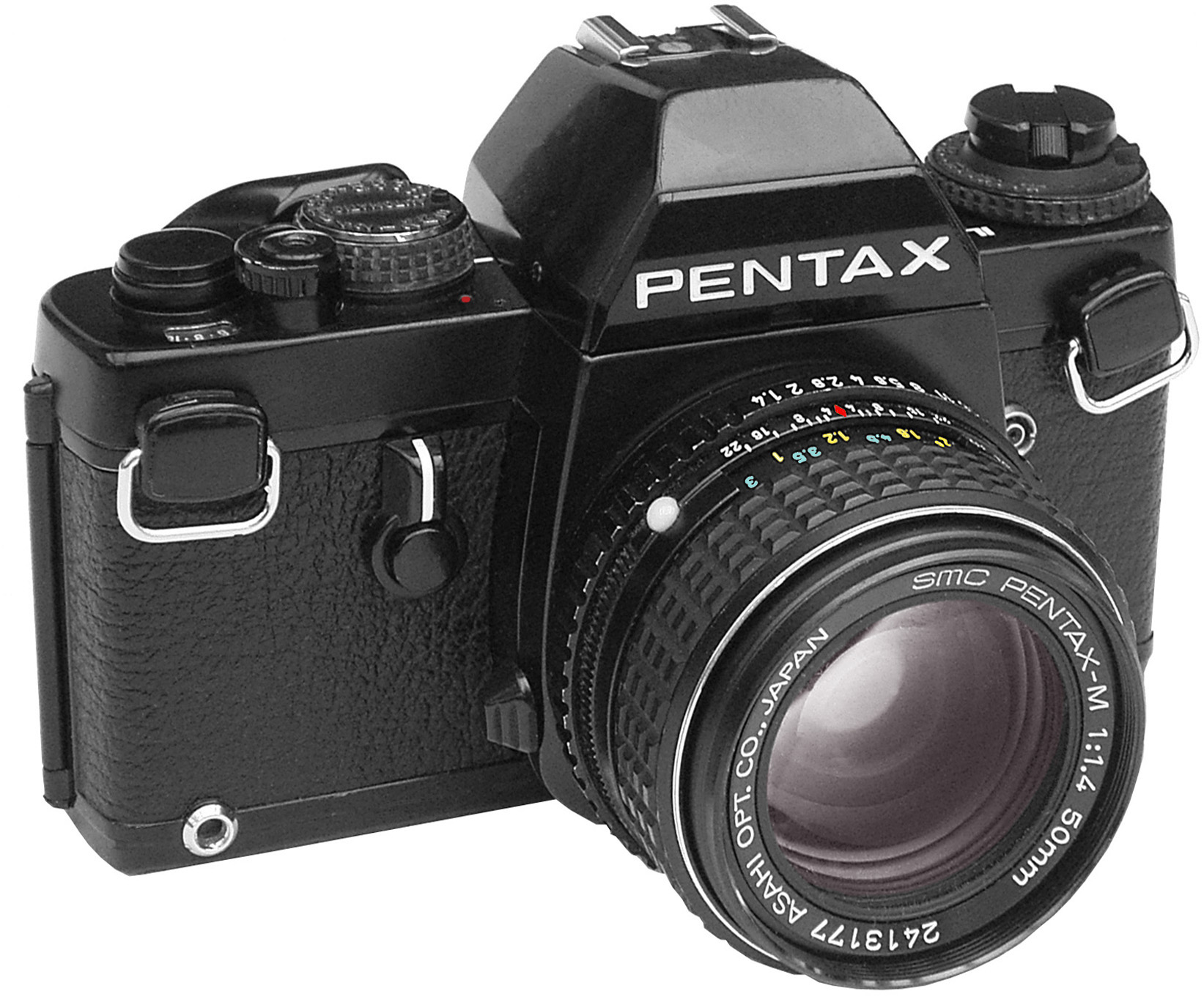
Pentax LX

The Pentax LX model was a tough, professional-grade competitor to the Nikon F3, the Canon New F-1, Olympus OM-2, and Contax RTS cameras. It replaced the K2 DMD as the Pentax 35mm flagship. It is rugged, weatherised and sealed against dust, yet compact and light. It has interchangeable viewfinders (more than any of its rivals) and focusing screens; the S69 screen being particularly bright. The LX uses an advanced metering system that also reads the light falling on the film and the first shutter curtain during exposure, the TTL OTF (off the film) feature, a Minolta patent, but utilised in the Olympus OM-2 in 1975. The selected aperture value and shutter speed are shown in the viewfinder. It had a large range of accessories which were mostly not interchangeable with other contemporary cameras. It remained in production for more than 20 years.

- LX (1980–2001)

=== A Series ===
The A series added fully programmed exposure control (adjusting both aperture and shutter speed automatically) to the M series. To enable control of the lens aperture by the camera body, it used the new KA-mount, a backward-compatible modification that also allowed the array of standard K-mount lenses to be used in manual and aperture-priority exposure modes. The A series were the first cameras from Pentax to use LCD digital displays for exposure information in the viewfinder. The super A / super PROGRAM and the program A / program PLUS both used a translucent white window on the front of the pentaprism to provide backlight to the LCD without having to use the battery for illumination.

- super A / super PROGRAM (1983–1987)
- program A / program PLUS (1984–1988)
- A3/A3000 (1985–1987)

=== P Series ===
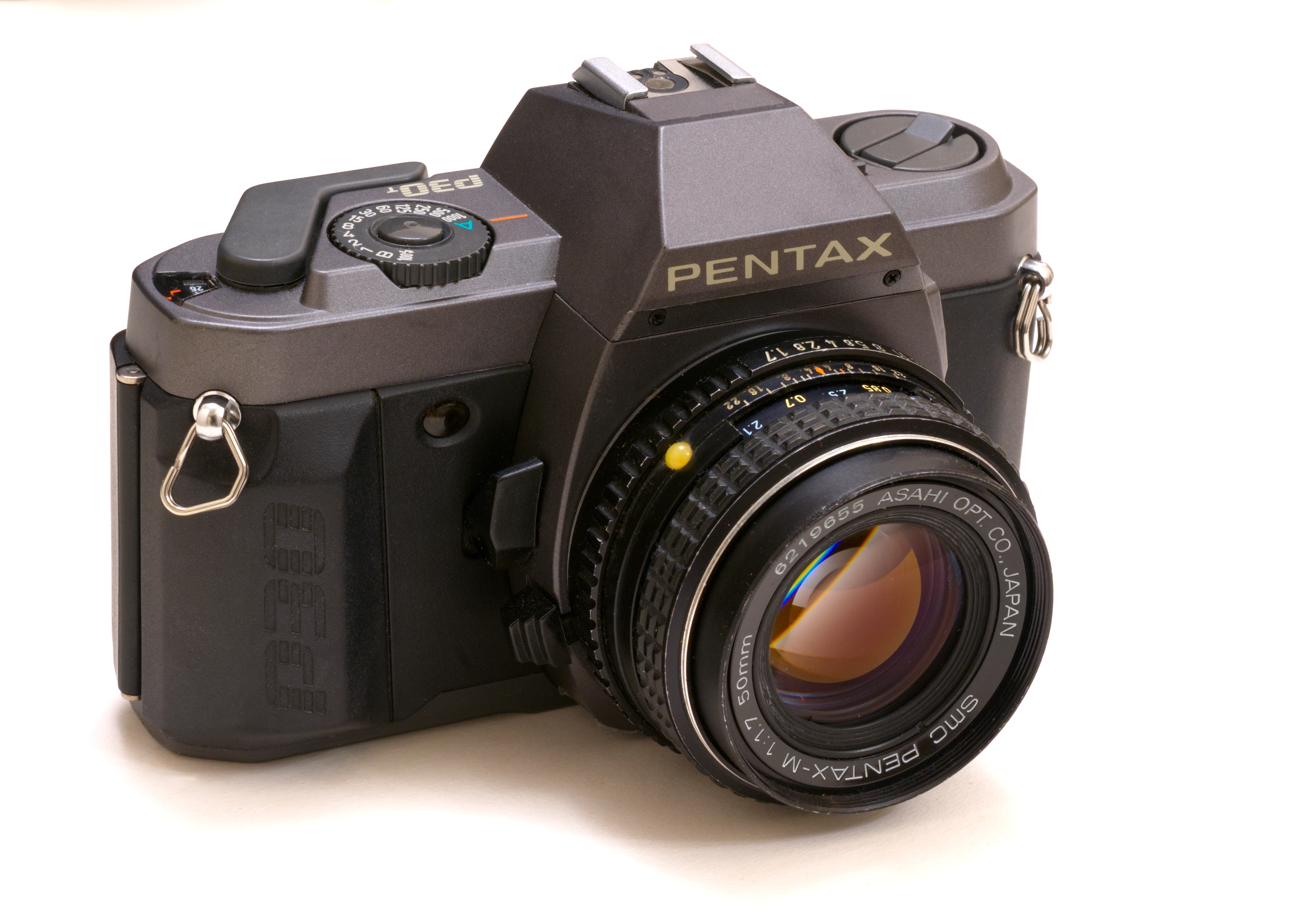
Pentax P30T

The P series featured fully programmed exposure control (in addition to manual mode), DX-code film speed setting (defaulting to 100 if the code couldn't be read), exposure lock and depth of field preview. All but the P3/P30 also offered Av mode, and the P5/P50 offered exposure compensation of ±3 EV.

- P5/P50 (1986–1989)
- P3/P30 (1985–1988)
- P3n/P30n (1988–1990)
- P30t (1990–1997)

=== SF Series ===
The SFX (called the SF1 in the US) was the world's first AF SLR with built-in TTL auto flash, which is retractable. Pentax has referred to the built-in flash as "RTF" (Retractable TTL Flash) ever since then. Pentax SAFOX I (Sensor Ability Fortifying Optical Correction System) autofocus module was integrated to these series.

- SFX/SF1 (1987–1989)
- SFXn/SF1n (1989–1993)
- SF7/SF10 (1988–1993)

=== Z/Pz Series ===
The second generation of autofocus cameras from Pentax. They are equipped with new SAFOX II autofocus module and power contact to enable power zoom function in power zoom FA lenses. In the United States the series was called PZ, while in the rest of the world it was called Z.

- Z-10 (1991)
- Z-1 (flagship model) (1991)
- Z-20 (1992)
- Z-50 (1992)
- Z-1P (flagship model) (1994)
- Z-5P (1994)
- Z-70 (1995)

=== MZ/ZX Series ===
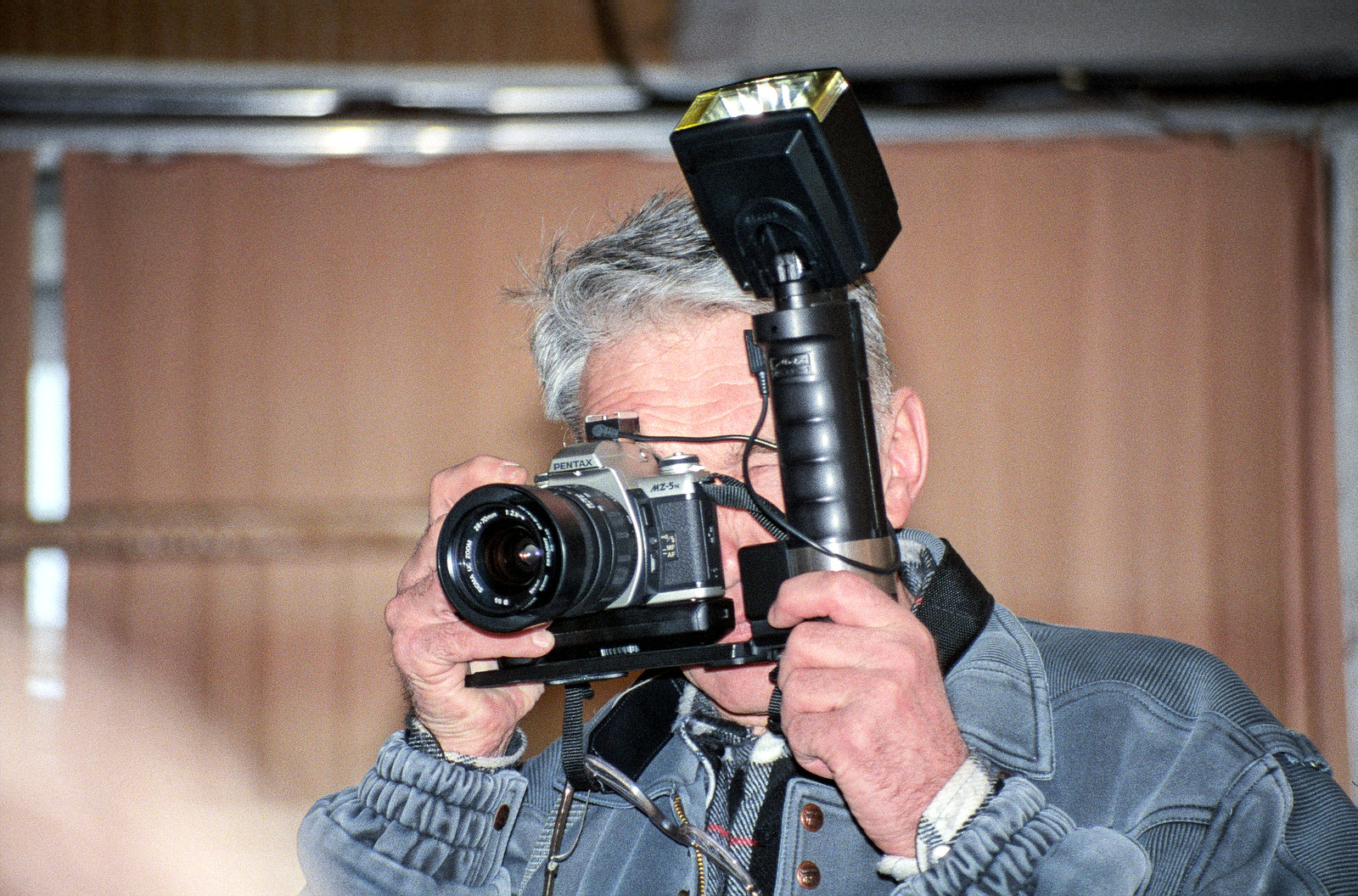
A photographer holds a Pentax MZ-5n with Metz flashlight.

This innovative series brought the "small and light" concept back from previous generation manual focus cameras. This series known as MZ models elsewhere were named ZX models in the US except MZ-S, the MZ-5 being known as the ZX-5 in the US. The exception to this rule was the MZ-6 which was known as the ZX-L in the US. Models shown on the same row are model replacements/upgrades in the range, so the MZ-10 was replaced by the MZ-7 which was subsequently replaced by the MZ-6.

All members of this series are compact autofocus SLRs except the MZ-M. The flagship model in this series is the MZ-S which body materials are metal, faster film drive and higher flash sync speed. Only MZ-S and MZ-6 are compatible with newly introduced P-TTL flash system. Both models can control remote flash wirelessly by popup flash commander mode in normal or high-speed flash sync.

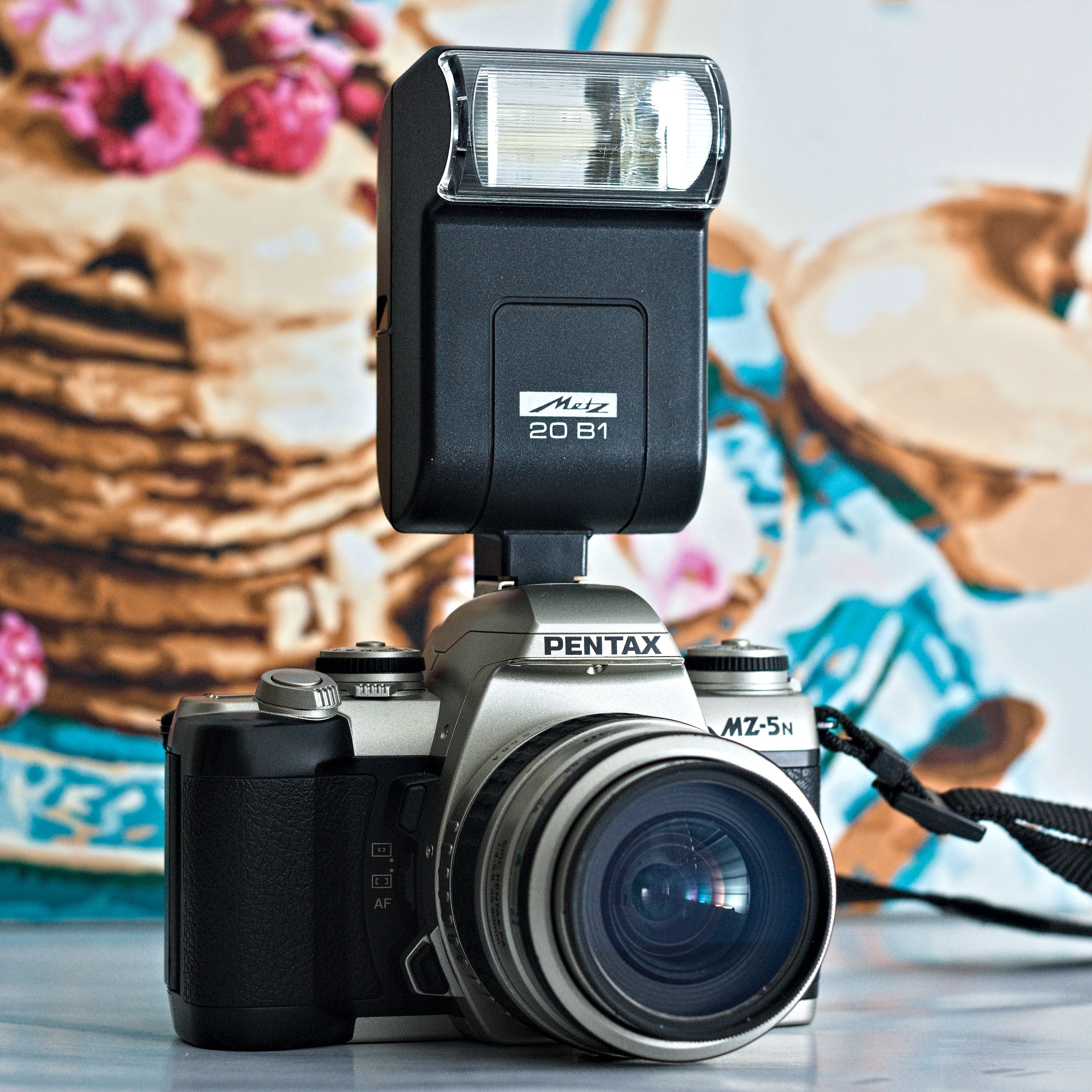
Pentax MZ-5n with Pentax 35 – 80 mm f/4 – 5.6 lens

SAFOX IV/V autofocus module are integrated into this series.

Models which were also backward compatible with both the KA and K mounts:

- MZ-S (flagship model) (2001)
- MZ-3 (1997)
- MZ-5 (1996) MZ-5n (1997)
- MZ-10 (1996) MZ-7 (1999) MZ-6/ZX-L/MZ-L (2001)
- MZ-M (manual focus only and no built-in flash) (1997)

Models which were backward compatible with the KA mount but not the K mount:

- MZ50 (1997) MZ30 (2000)
- MZ60 (2002)

=== *ist Series (Film) ===
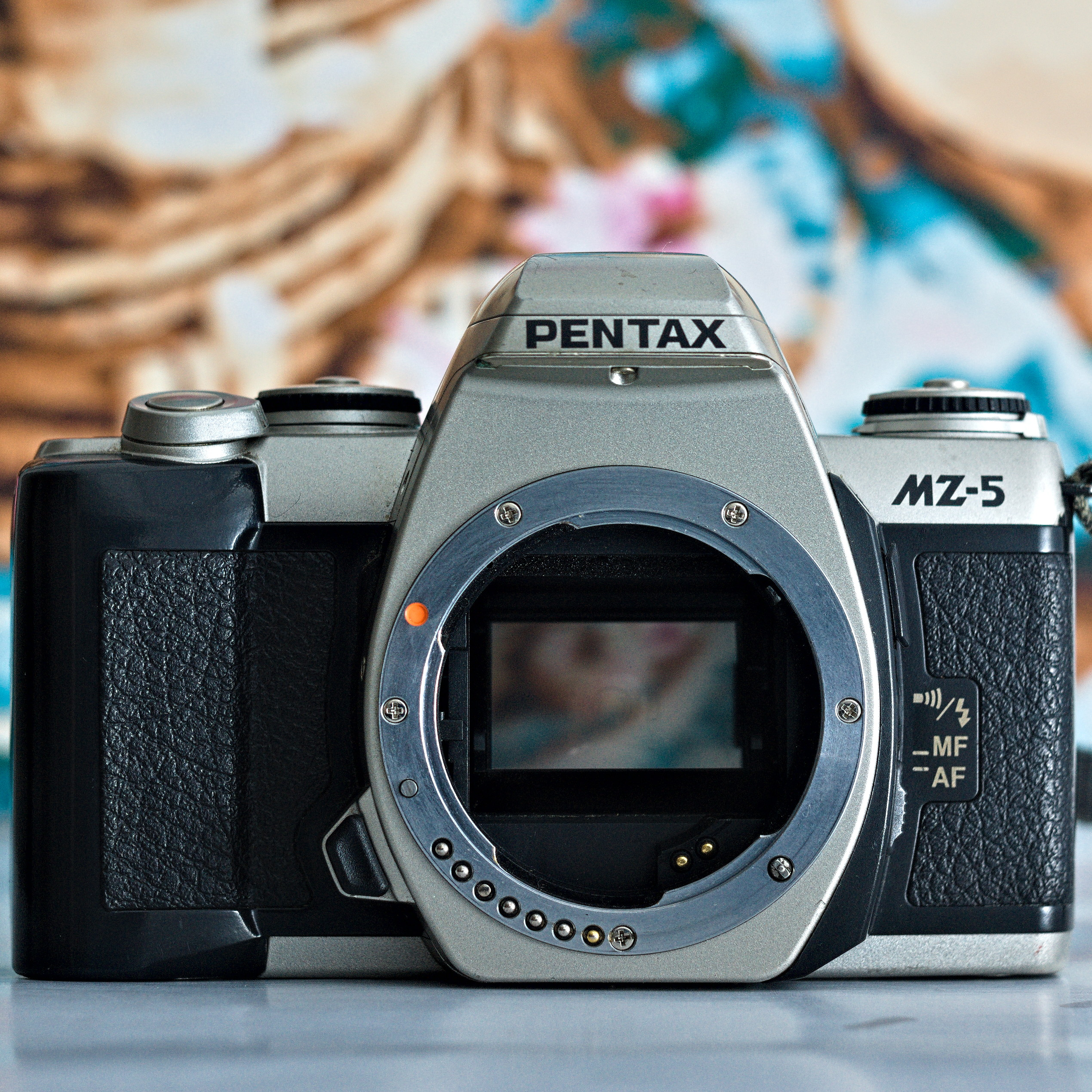
Pentax MZ-5 without lens

- *ist (2003–2006)

A full complement of exposure modes, Av, Tv, Program, Bulb and Manual, plus a few "scene" modes.
Auto-exposure backward compatible with the KA mount but not the K mount.
K mount lenses can be used in Manual mode, but the metering needs to be made separately and applied manually, with no indication of aperture in the viewfinder.
Can also use M42 screw-mount lenses in aperture priority (Av) with stop-down metering with the appropriate M42-PK adaptor fitted.
Auto-focus available for all "screw-drive" lenses, but no power contacts for power zoom or the later lenses with built-in focus motors.
Aperture and shutter information visible in the viewfinder.
Focus confirmation in the viewfinder for all lenses of f/5.6 or wider.
17 Custom Functions to help configure the camera to individual preferences.
Uses an infra-red sensor for film transport, making the camera unsuitable for infra-red photography.

== Digital ==
=== MZ-D Prototype ===
The Pentax MZ-D, also known by its internal code name of MR-52, was a prototype digital single-lens reflex camera. It was announced at photokina in September 2000 and was demonstrated to the press at the Photo Marketing Association (PMA) show in January 2001. In October 2003, Pentax canceled the camera, stating "The cost of manufacturing the prototype SLR 6-megapixel digital camera meant it was not a viable product for our target market."

=== *ist Series (Digital) ===
In 2003 Pentax introduced their first Digital SLR under Digital *ist series and released the first flagship model, the Pentax *ist D which uses a Sony 6 megapixel CCD. Since 2003, the *ist D is the only digital SLR that can control HS wireless P-TTL from its pop-up flash and has many advanced features for professional applications. In 2004 Pentax released the second member in the digital *ist line, the Pentax *ist DS which is the first real consumer model (retailing under US$1,000). What set Pentax D and DS DSLRs apart from the competition was the clarity and high magnification provided by their pentaprism viewfinders, a very useful feature considering the support for legacy manual focus lenses. In 2005 Pentax released the Pentax *ist DL, a model with fewer features than the D and DS with a lower price. All Pentax's digital SLRs are compatible with K-mount lenses, and M42 (42 mm screw mount) lenses (with adaptor). Due to the smaller size of the CCD, lenses have an effective field of view of 1.5 × times the same lens in 35 mm format. So, where a 50 mm lens was considered a "normal" lens on 35 mm film, that same lens on a 1.5× "crop factor" camera has the field of view of a 75 mm lens on film. This only uses the center of the lens' projected image. To address this "crop factor," Pentax created a new series of lenses that were designed only to cover the smaller sensor. These are the DA series for their digital SLRs, which still feature the K-mount but have a smaller back-focus element designed specifically for use with the Digital SLR lineup. The DA series lenses do not have a mechanical aperture ring and so are not backward compatible with some earlier film bodies. The later D-FA lens series re-introduces a mechanical aperture ring in some lenses and these are fully compatible with both film and digital SLRs.

SAFOX VIII are integrated into this camera series.

- *ist D Flagship model (2003–2006)
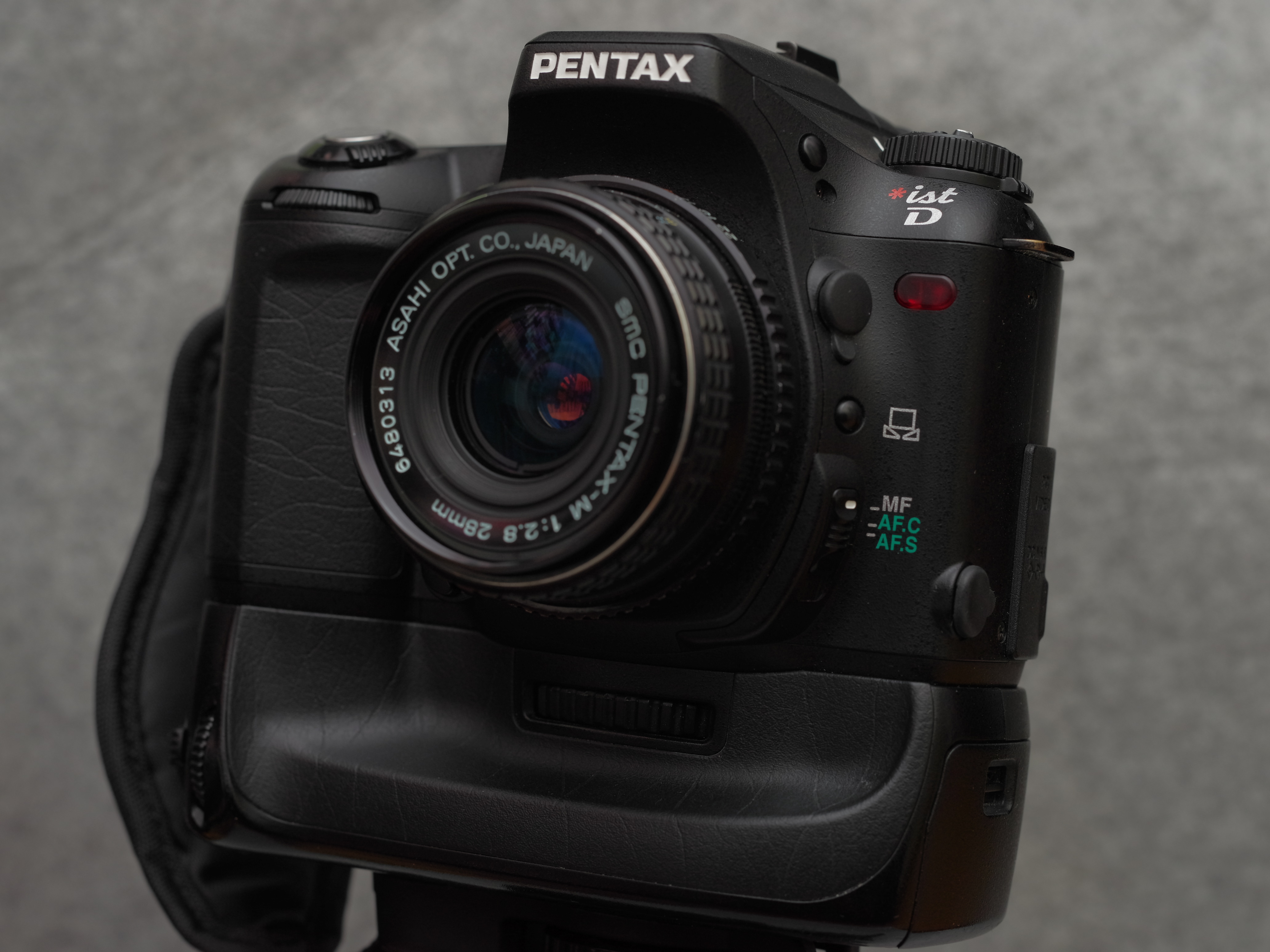
- Pentax *istD with D-BG1
  *ist DS (2004–2005)
- *ist DS2 (2005–2006)
- *ist DL (2005–2006)
- *ist DL2 (2006)

=== K Series (Digital) ===
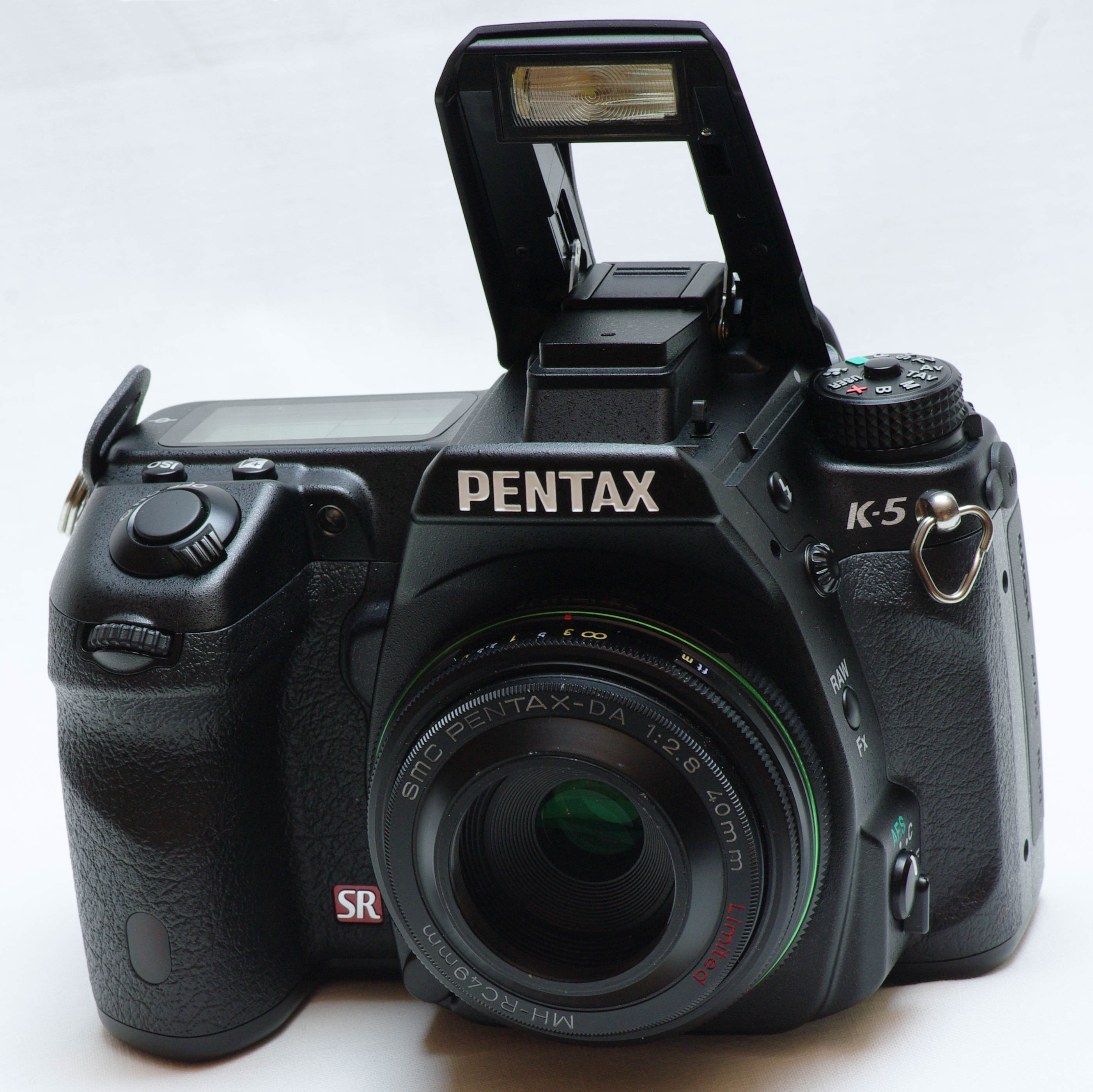
Pentax K-5

In May 2006, Pentax announced a new line of Digital SLR cameras to replace Digital *ist series. The K100D and K110D replaced *ist DL2 and DS2, while incorporating in-body shake reduction in the K100D model. The Pentax K10D, a new flagship model in Digital K series replaced *ist D, adopted Sony 10-megapixel CCD sensor and weather-sealing construction, was announced on 14 September 2006.

The K10D featured a pentaprism viewfinder (instead of the slightly dimmer pentamirror on some previous models), full programmed, aperture and shutter priority modes, and a new Sensitivity-priority mode where the rear dial adjusts light sensitivity and the camera adjusts shutter speed and aperture to maintain correct exposure. Power contacts on the lens mount were introduced to enable Pentax's SDM (Supersonic Drive Motor) for silent focusing. The power contacts also provide the power zoom function in some FA lens that Pentax introduced in the 1990s. In addition, the K10D could write JPEGs and two versions of RAW files (PEF, and the Adobe specification DNG).

The K100D Super was a slight upgrade to the K100D announced in June 2007. The upgrade included some features from the K10D, such as an improved shake reduction (SR) system, a dust removal system, and power contacts for SDM lenses, but which could not enable the power zoom function as the K10D.

On January 23, 2008, Pentax announced the K20D and K200D, which replaced the K10D and K100D series respectively. The K20D featured a Samsung 14.6 megapixel CMOS APS-C sized sensor, a special 21 frame/s burst mode, live preview on the LCD, and an increased sensitivity range extending to ISO 3200. The K200D adopted the 10 megapixel sensor and weather sealing of the K10D, among other improvements, while retaining the smaller body size of the K100D Super.

The K-m / K2000 for US was announced on September 22, 2008 at the 2008 photokina trade show along with the DA-L series of lightweight, inexpensive lenses.

On May 20, 2009, Pentax announced the K-7 as a replacement for the K20D. It introduced an updated version of the Samsung CMOS sensor, but with an entirely new compact design. Notable new features included full metal body construction, a pentaprism viewfinder covering 100% of the frame, 720p video capture, a quieter and faster shutter mechanism, and the ability to apply automatic corrections for lens distortion and lateral chromatic aberration. This flagship model uses a 77 multi-zone metering system and updated focus – SAFOX VIII+. The K-7 was available from July 2009.

In September 2009 the K-x, was introduced to replace the entry level K-m / K2000 (US). A review by Imaging Resource emphasised its "excellent high ISO performance" and "excellent print quality".

In September 2010 Pentax announced the K-r, a 6 frames per second 12.4 megapixel camera and the K-5, a 7 frames per second 16.3 megapixel camera. These cameras use a new, faster autofocus system, SAFOX IX.

In February 2012 information about the Pentax K-01 Mirrorless camera was released. It still uses the standard K mount but lacks an optical reflex viewfinder. The K-01 quickly became one of the most controversial Pentax offerings, with criticism focusing on the innovative Marc Newson design, which many considered made the camera uncomfortable to hold, with poorly placed controls, while acknowledging its strong image quality and low-light / high ISO performance. Within months, the retail price had dropped by 50% and after a year the model was discontinued.

Pentax announced a new mid-level DSLR, the K-30, in May 2012. It has the same APS-C sensor and processor as the K-01, and is fully weather-sealed. In September 2012, Pentax announced the successor to the K-5, the K-5 II. It has the same APS-C sensor as the K-5, but has an improved autofocus sensor and a redesigned rear LCD with no air gap. A version of the camera without an anti-aliasing filter would be sold as the K-5 IIs. Both cameras were released in October 2012.

In June 2013 Pentax announced the successors to the K-30, the K-50 and K-500. Both are mid-level DSLRs, the K-500 being a stripped-down version of the K-50, having no weather seals and less-advanced electronics. Pentax K-500 uses 4 AA batteries (rechargeable Lithium battery is optional), while Pentax K-50 uses rechargeable Lithium battery.

In October 2013 Pentax launched the successor to the K-5ii and K-5iis, the Pentax K-3. The K-3 is the first DSLR to use its shake reduction system to function as an anti-aliasing filter. It has a 24.71 megapixel sensor and other improvements over the K-5 but maintains the rugged stainless steel frame and magnesium alloy body construction, complete with 92 body seals thereby rendering the camera cold-proof and water resistant.

- Pentax K100D (2006–2007)
- Pentax K110D (2006–2007)
- Pentax K10D (2006–2008)
- Pentax K10D Grand Prix (limited edition) (2007)
- Pentax K100D Super (2007–2008)
- Pentax K200D (2008–2009)
- Pentax K20D (2008–2009)
- Pentax K-m (Pentax K2000 in U.S.) (2008–2009)
- Pentax K-7 (2009–2010)
- Pentax K-x (2009–2011)
- Pentax K-r (2010–2012)
- Pentax K-5 (2010–2012)
- Pentax K-01 (2012–2013)
- Pentax K-30 (2012–2013)
- Pentax K-5 II (2012–2014)
- Pentax K-5 IIs (2012–2014)
- Pentax K-50 (2013–2016)
- Pentax K-500 (2013–2014)
- Pentax K-3 (2013–2015)
- Pentax K-S1 (2014–2016)
- Pentax K-S2 (2015–?)
- Pentax K-3 II (2015–2018)
- Pentax K-1 (2016–2018)
- Pentax K-70 (2016–2022)
- Pentax KP (2017–2021)
- Pentax K-1 II (2018–2026)
- Pentax K-3 III (2021–2026)
- Pentax KF (2022–2026)

=== Medium Format ===
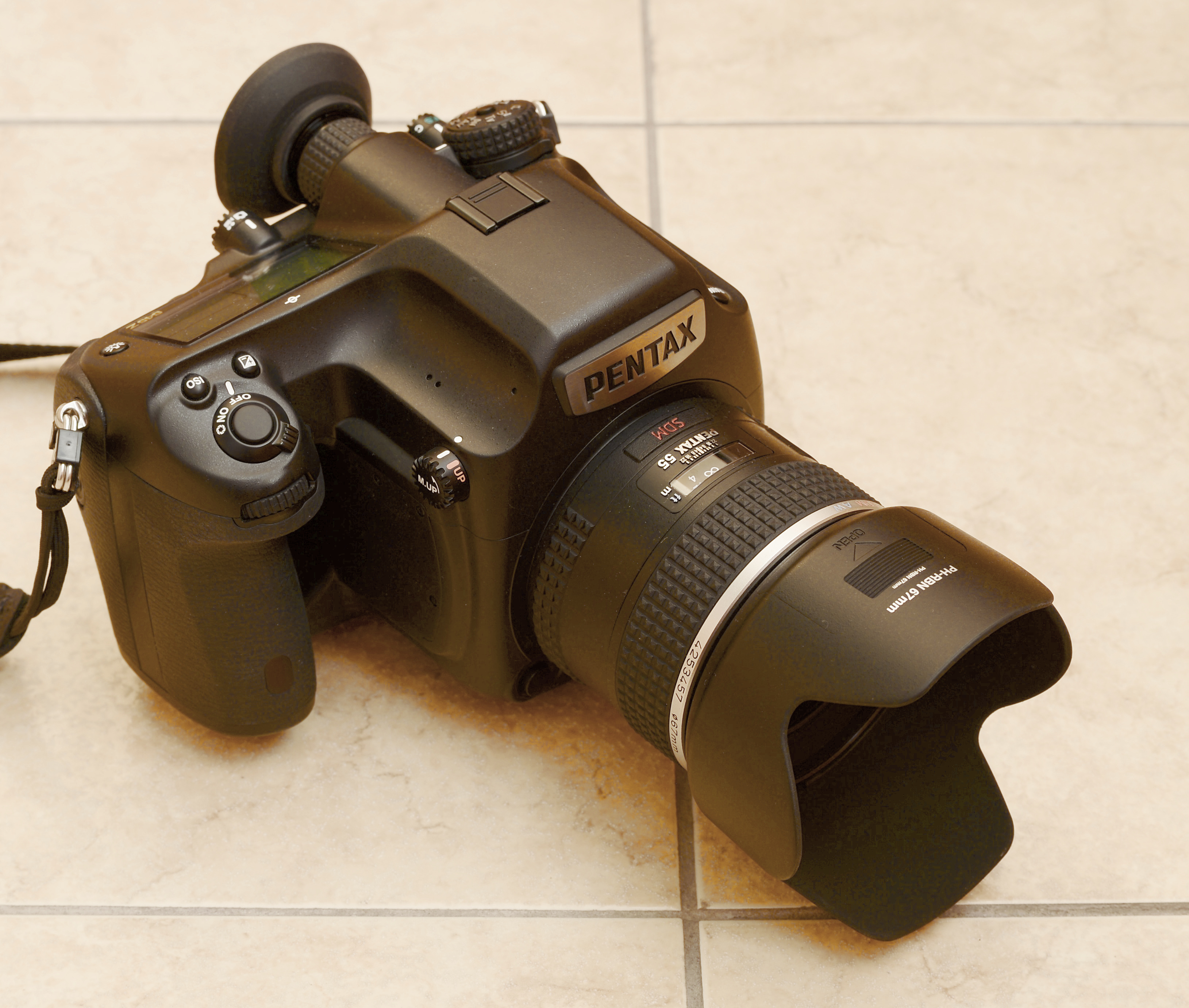
The 645Z medium format camera

In March 2010 Pentax announced its first medium format digital camera, the Pentax 645D. The camera has been in and out of development since 2003 and went on sale in Japan in May 2010 at RRP of ¥850,000, with supplies to the rest of the world expected to start soon after. It is targeted at professionals doing outdoor photography—camera body features very high level of airtightness. It uses a 40 megapixels, 44 mm × 33 mm CCD sensor. At the same time, a new series of lenses designated D FA 645 (featuring Weather Sealing on all such lenses) was also released.

The 51.4 megapixel CMOS sensor 645Z was announced in February 2014 at the CP+ 2014 Camera and Imaging Show.

=== Pentax Q ===
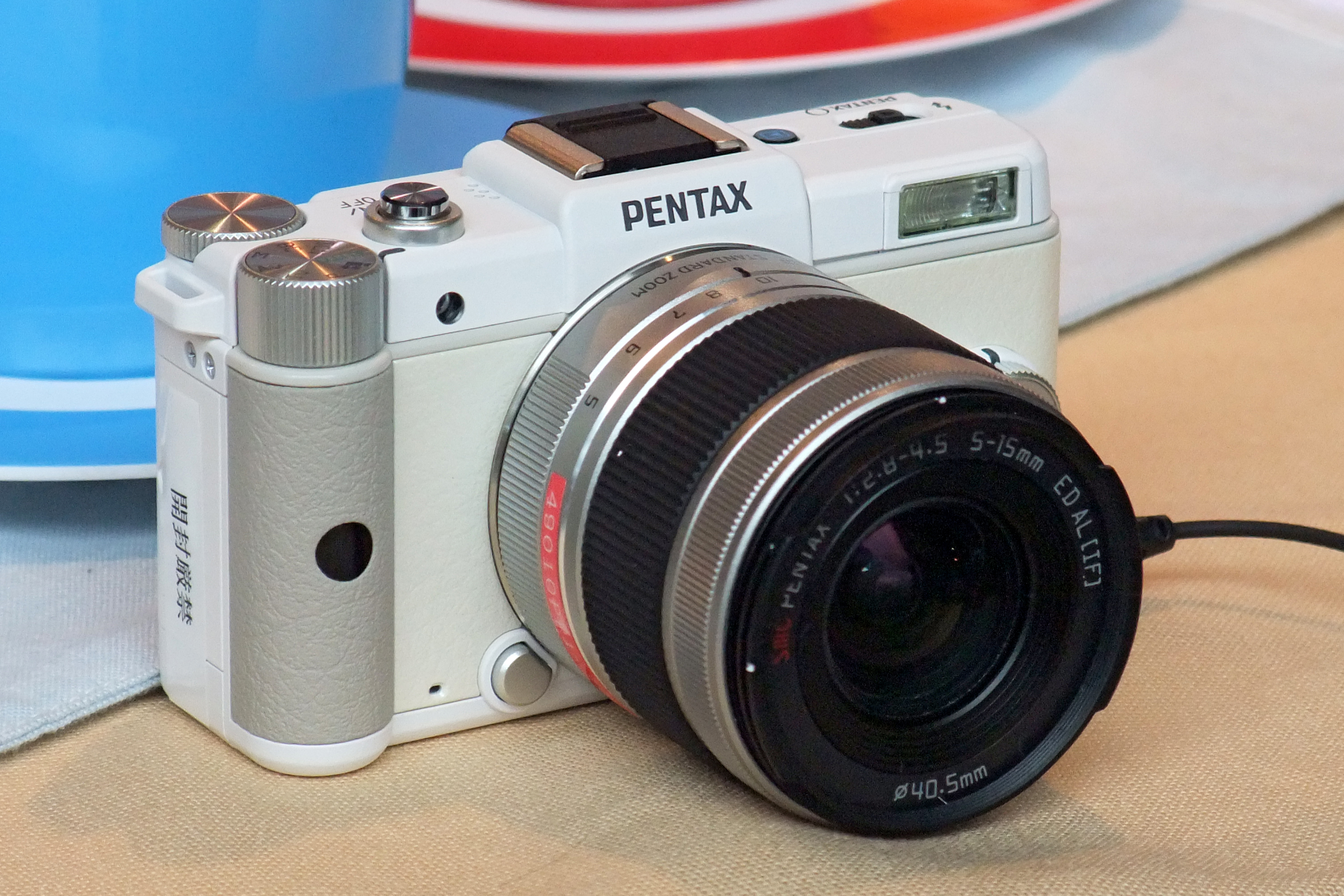
Pentax Q

In June 2011 Pentax announced the 'Pentax Q' mirrorless interchangeable lens camera and the 'Q-mount' lens system. It has a small, 1/2.3 inch 12.4 megapixel LED Backlit CMOS sensor.

Announced in September, 2012, the Q10 has a slightly redesigned body and an improved sensor. Most features and specifications were unchanged. The launch price was also lower than that of the Original Q. In June 2013, the next generation of the Q series, the Q7, was announced. The most significant change is that the Q7 uses a larger 1/1.7 inch sensor with the same 12.4 MP resolution. The Q-S1, largely a cosmetic update of the Q7 with the same sensor size and resolution, was announced in August 2014.

=== Optio (Digital) ===
The Optio line is a series of consumer digital cameras. It is one of the earliest mass-market examples of a digital point-and-shoot camera.

=== Full-frame format ===
In early 2015, Ricoh announced development of a Pentax full-frame DSLR for release later in the year, and at the CP+ show in Yokohama Japan, a mockup was displayed that suggested the camera's potential specifications, including: an IR port for remote release, an anti-aliasing filter simulation mode, and an articulating rear LCD.

On February 17, 2016 Ricoh unveiled the Pentax K-1 full-frame DSLR with 36MP sensor. The camera started shipping late April 2016. The updated K-1 II was launched on 22 February 2018.

== Other formats ==
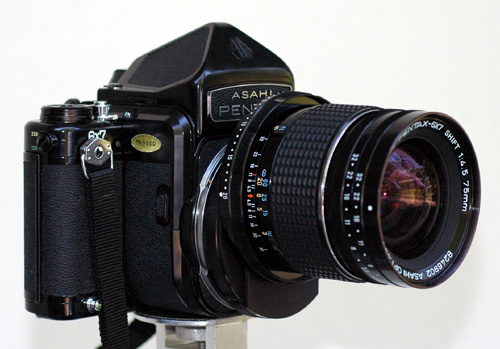
Pentax 6 × 7 with a 75 mm f/4.5 shift lens

Pentax is one of the few camera manufacturers still producing medium format cameras up to 1999. There are two offerings, one in the 6×7 format—the Pentax 67 II, and one in the 6×4.5 format—Pentax 645NII. Both use 120 or 220 roll film. These cameras build on the Pentax SLR design experience. The shape of the Pentax 67 is broadly similar to a 35 mm SLR camera. By contrast, the Pentax 645 resembles other medium-format cameras by makers such as Mamiya and Bronica, which tend to be cube-shaped.

Previous models include the Pentax 645 and 645N, and Asahi Pentax 6x7, Pentax 6x7 and Pentax 67.

Another interesting product was the tiny Auto 110 reflex system, based on the 110 pocket-instamatic film format.

== See also ==
- Pentax (lens)
- List of Pentax products
- List of digital camera brands
- List of photographic equipment makers
- History of the single-lens reflex camera

Type	Sensor	Class	2003	2004	2005	2006		2007	2008	2009	2010	2011	2012	2013	2014	2015	2016	2017	2018	2019	2020	2021	2022	2023	2024	2025
DSLR	MF	Professional										645D				645Z										
DSLR	FF	Professional																K-1		K-1 II						
DSLR	APS-C	High-end															K-3 II						K-3 III			
DSLR	APS-C	High-end													K-3											
DSLR	APS-C	Advanced									K-7	K-5		K-5 II / K-5 IIs												
DSLR	APS-C	Advanced		*ist D			K10D		K20D									KP								
DSLR	APS-C	Midrange					K100D	100DS	K200D					K-30	K-50			K-70						KF		
DSLR	APS-C	Entry-level			*ist DS	*ist DS2						K-r			K-500	K-S2										
DSLR	APS-C	Entry-level			*ist DL	DL2	K110D			K-m/K2000	K-x					K-S1										
MILC	APS-C	K-mount											K-01													
MILC	1/1.7"	Q-mount													Q7											
MILC	1/1.7"	Q-mount														Q-S1										
MILC	1/2.3"	Q-mount											Q	Q10												
DSLR	Prototypes		MZ-D (2000); 645D Prototype (2006); AP 50th Anniv. (2007)																							
Type	Sensor	Class																								
Type	Sensor	Class	2003	2004	2005	2006		2007	2008	2009	2010	2011	2012	2013	2014	2015	2016	2017	2018	2019	2020	2021	2022	2023	2024	2025

Type	Sensor	2011	2012	2013	2014	2015	2016	2017	2018	2019	2020	2021
K-mount	APS-C		K-01									
Q-mount	1/1.7"				Q7	Q-S1						
Q-mount	1/2.3"		Q	Q10								

Class	1970s										1980s										1990s										2000s									
Class	0	1	2	3	4	5	6	7	8	9	0	1	2	3	4	5	6	7	8	9	0	1	2	3	4	5	6	7	8	9	0	1	2	3	4	5	6	7	8	9
Flagship																						PZ-1 (Z-1)			PZ-1p (Z-1p)							MZ-S								
Flagship																									PZ-5p (Z-5p)															
Flagship											LX																													
Flagship							MX																																	
Flagship						K2 DMD																																		
Flagship						K2																																		
Midrange																		SFX (SF-1)			SFXn (SF-1n)							MZ-3 (ZX-3)				MZ-6 (ZX-L, MZ-L)								
Midrange																	P5 (P50)									MZ-5 (ZX-5)		MZ-5n (ZX-5n)												
Midrange														Super-A (Super Program)										PZ-20p (Z-20p)						MZ-7 (ZX-7)										
Midrange														Program-A (Program Plus)										Z-50p				MZ-50 (ZX-50)			MZ-30 (ZX-30)		MZ-60 (ZX-60)							
Midrange						KX						ME F														PZ-70p (Z-70p)														
Midrange							ME			ME Super																														
Entry-level																			SF7 (SF10)								MZ-10 (ZX-10)							*ist						
Entry-level																							PZ-20 (Z-20)			PZ-70 (Z-70)														
Entry-level																						PZ-10 (Z-10)																		
Entry-level																P3 (P30)			P3n (P30n)		P3t (P30t)								MZ-M (ZX-M)											
Entry-level						KM				MV	MV 1		MG			A3 (A3000)																								
Entry-level							K1000																																	
