= Pentax K-S1 =

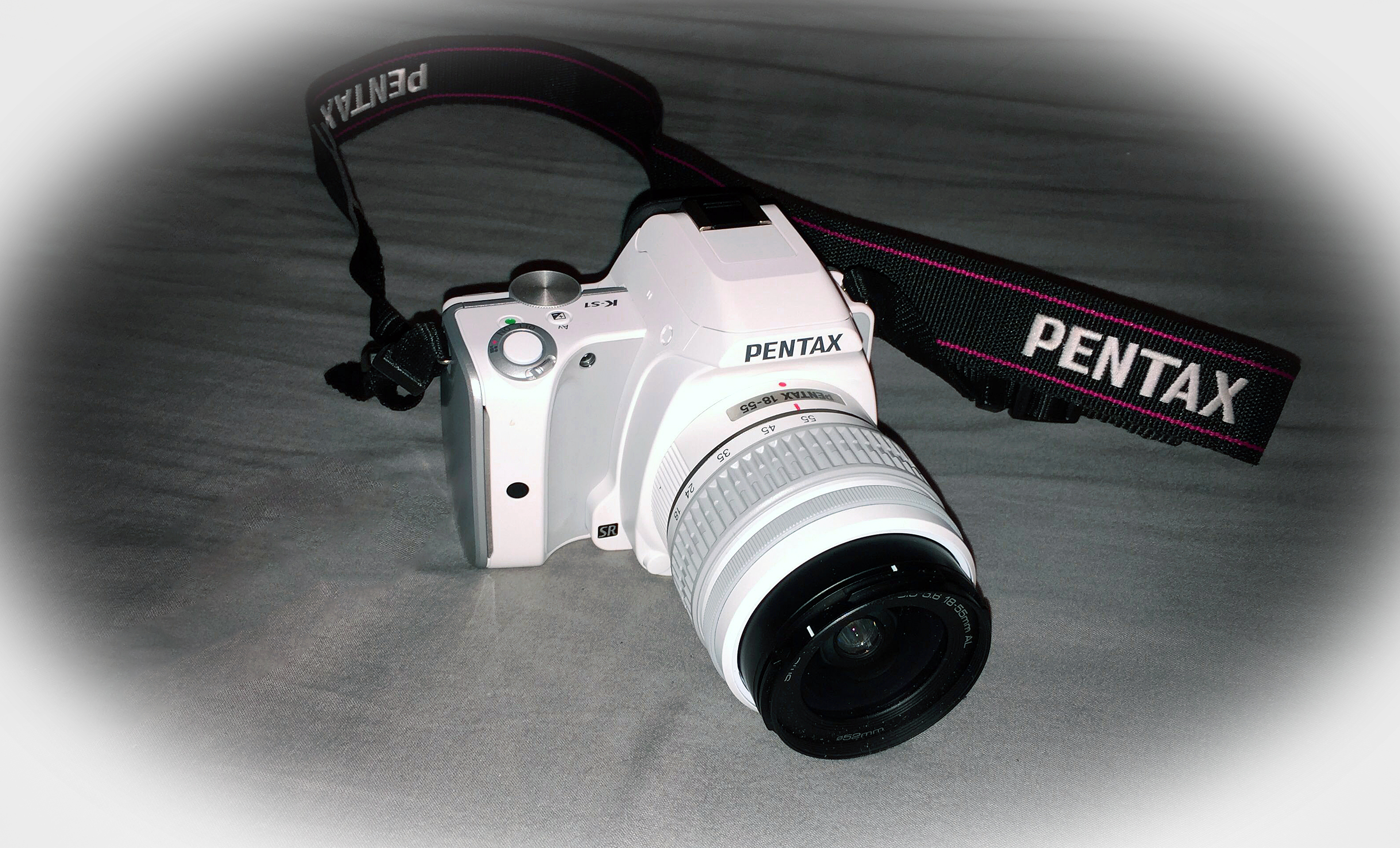

Overview
- Maker: Ricoh

Sensor/medium
- Sensor type: CMOS
- Sensor size: 23.5 x 15.6 mm (APS-C type)
- Maximum resolution: 5472 x 3848 (20 megapixels)
- Film speed: 100-51200
- Recording medium: SD, SDHC or SDXC memory card

Focusing
- Focus areas: 11 focus points

Shutter
- Shutter speeds: 1/6000s to 30s
- Continuous shooting: 5 frames per second

Viewfinder
- Viewfinder magnification: 0.95
- Frame coverage: 100%

Image processing
- Image processor: Prime MII
- White balance: Yes

General
- LCD screen: 3 inches with 921,000 dots
- Battery: D-LI109
- Dimensions: 121 x 93 x 70 mm (4.76 x 3.66 x 2.76 inches)
- Weight: 558 g (20 oz)including battery

The Pentax K-S1 is a midrange DSLR camera announced by Ricoh on August 27, 2014. It has a 20 megapixel sensor — new to the Pentax line-up — and an anti-aliasing filter simulator as previously seen in the Pentax K-3. Also adopted from the K-3 is compatibility with the Pentax FluCard, which allows wireless tethered shooting and wireless download of images from the camera.

In other respects, the K-S1 inherits a fair amount from the K-30/K-50 lineage, such as the compact, 100% coverage viewfinder, 1/6000s shutter and D-LI109 battery. A stereo microphone is also built in, to complement the 1080p at 30 frames/second video capability.

The K-S1 is slightly larger than the Canon EOS 100D, which as of August 2014 was the smallest DSLR in production.

== Reception ==
The K-S1 received mixed to positive reviews and reviews did appreciate that Ricoh attempted to innovate, including having LEDs in the grip, which mostly serves no purpose but can be useful in timer mode. The design was enough of a departure from normal Pentax cameras that multiple reviews noted that the K-S2 returned to "normality in terms of design and button layout".

The K-S1 won the 2015 Australian Camera magazine Imaging Awards for customer digital SLR of the year.

Type	Sensor	Class	2003	2004	2005	2006		2007	2008	2009	2010	2011	2012	2013	2014	2015	2016	2017	2018	2019	2020	2021	2022	2023	2024	2025
DSLR	MF	Professional										645D				645Z										
DSLR	FF	Professional																K-1		K-1 II						
DSLR	APS-C	High-end															K-3 II						K-3 III			
DSLR	APS-C	High-end													K-3											
DSLR	APS-C	Advanced									K-7	K-5		K-5 II / K-5 IIs												
DSLR	APS-C	Advanced		*ist D			K10D		K20D									KP								
DSLR	APS-C	Midrange					K100D	100DS	K200D					K-30	K-50			K-70						KF		
DSLR	APS-C	Entry-level			*ist DS	*ist DS2						K-r			K-500	K-S2										
DSLR	APS-C	Entry-level			*ist DL	DL2	K110D			K-m/K2000	K-x					K-S1										
MILC	APS-C	K-mount											K-01													
MILC	1/1.7"	Q-mount													Q7											
MILC	1/1.7"	Q-mount														Q-S1										
MILC	1/2.3"	Q-mount											Q	Q10												
DSLR	Prototypes		MZ-D (2000); 645D Prototype (2006); AP 50th Anniv. (2007)																							
Type	Sensor	Class																								
Type	Sensor	Class	2003	2004	2005	2006		2007	2008	2009	2010	2011	2012	2013	2014	2015	2016	2017	2018	2019	2020	2021	2022	2023	2024	2025
