= Asahiflex =

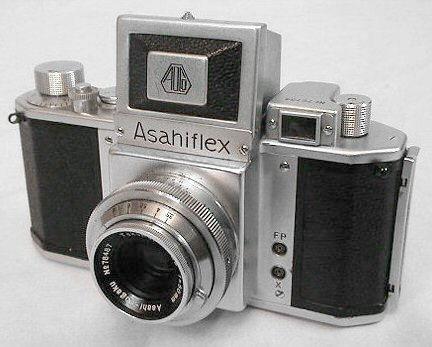
- Asahiflex IIB, Model I

Overview
- Type: 35 mm SLR camera

Lens
- Lens mount: M37 Screw Mount

Focusing
- Focus: manual

Exposure/metering
- Exposure: manual

Flash
- Flash: hot shoe

The Asahiflex is the 35 mm single-lens reflex camera built and sold by the Asahi Optical Corporation, which later became Pentax.

== History ==
Asahi Optical introduced its first 35 mm camera in 1952. Unlike the majority of Japanese camera manufacturers of the time, Asahi made a conscious decision not to produce a copy of a German rangefinder camera. Instead, Asahi decided to copy the Praktiflex, a 1939 design, made in the German Democratic Republic. Asahi's designers (Nobuyuki Yoshida and Ryohei Suzuki) were convinced of the inherent superiority of the SLR and so proceeded along these lines. This effort resulted in the Asahiflex I, which was also the first Japanese 35 mm SLR.

Note: According to company information from Asahi Optical Co., however, the Asahiflex I is based on Mr. Matsumoto’s Kochmann Reflex-Korelle, a pre-war 6x6 roll film camera.

The Asahiflex was succeeded by the Asahi Pentax camera, released in 1957, which added an integral pentaprism eye-level viewfinder. Pentax was derived from the portmanteau created by PENTAprism AsahifleX and would later go on to be adopted by Asahi as its corporate name.

== Asahiflex models ==
- Asahiflex I (1952–1953)
- Asahiflex IA (1953–1954)
- Asahiflex IIB (1954–1956)
- Asahiflex IIA (1955–1957)
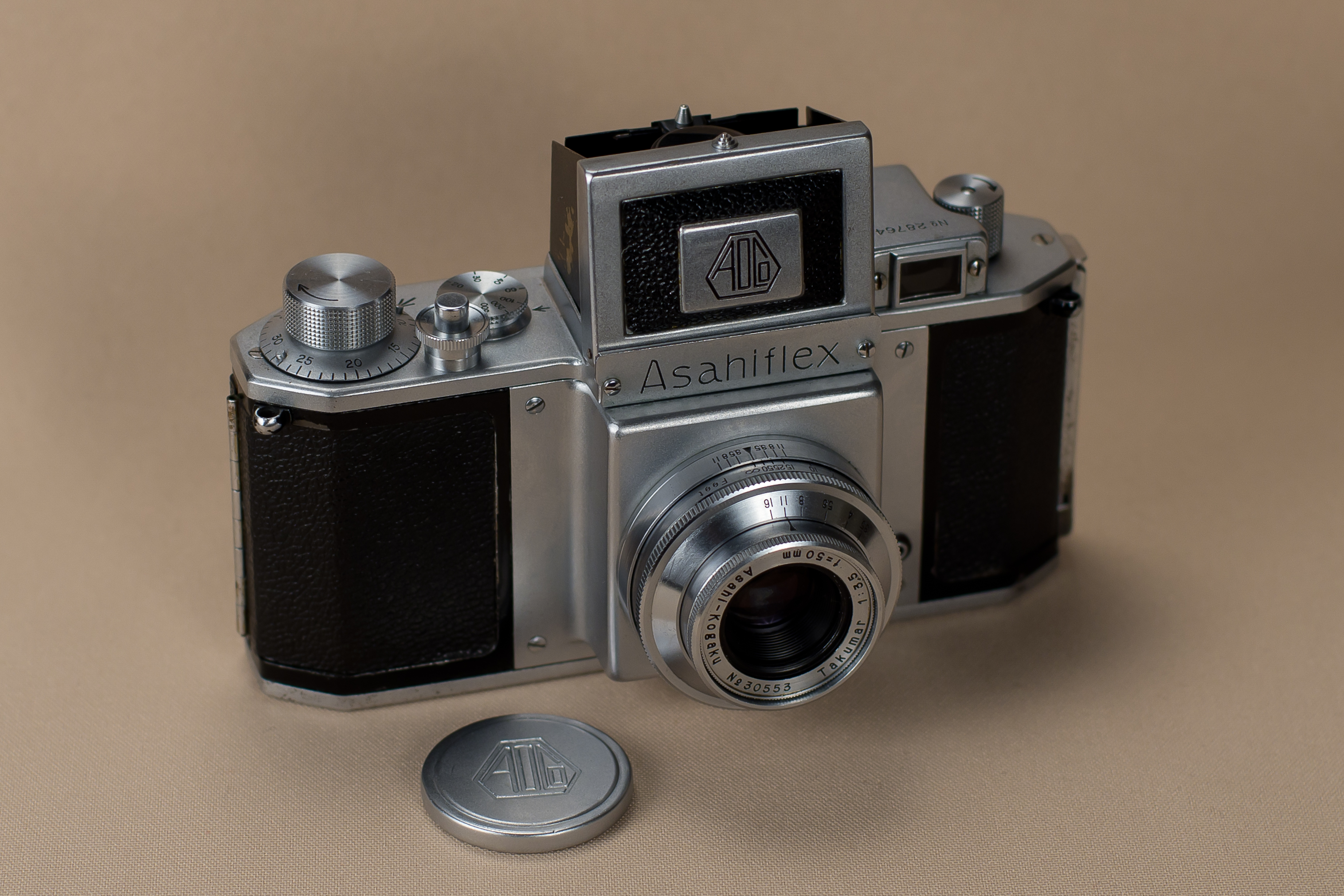
Asahiflex I

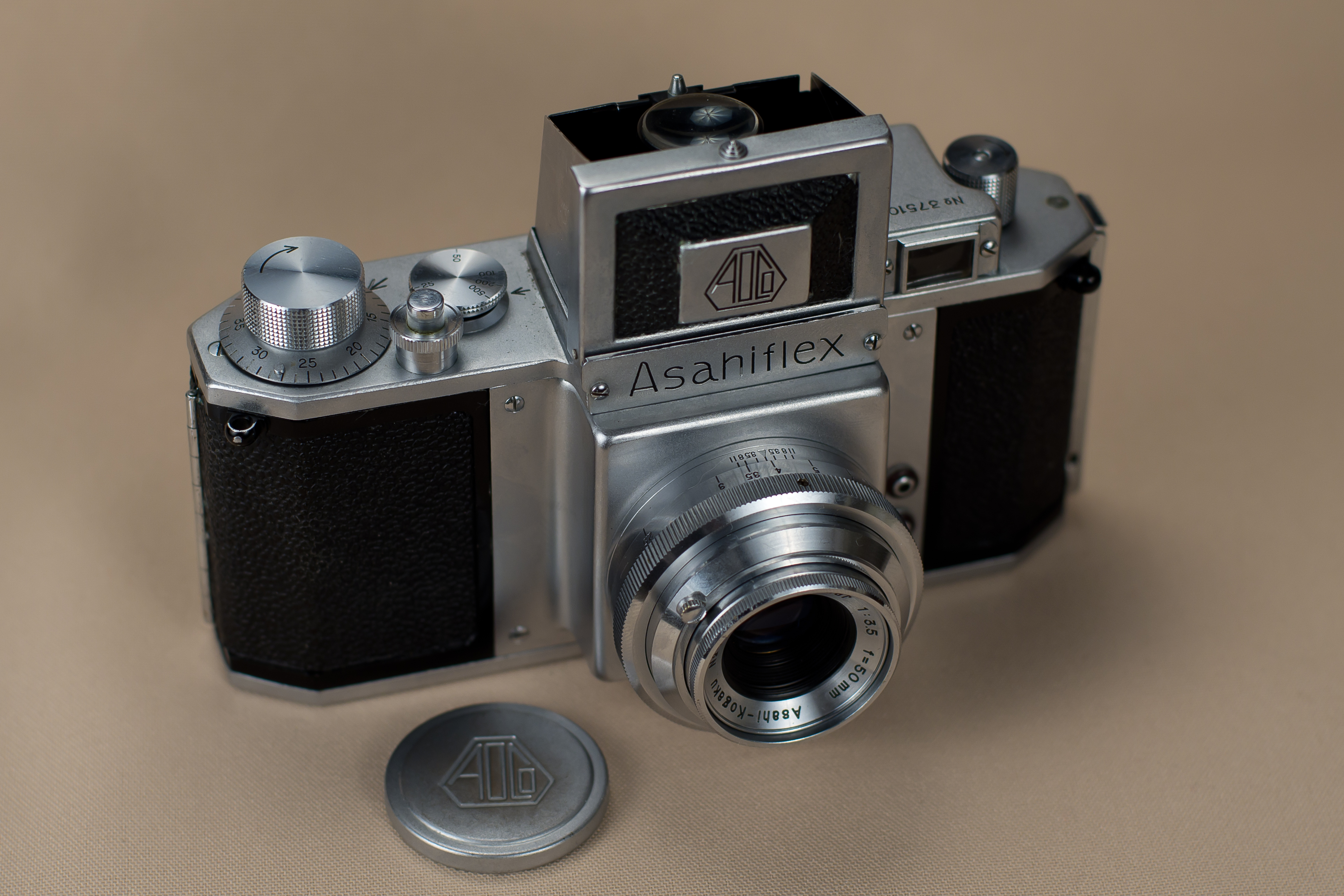
Asahiflex IA

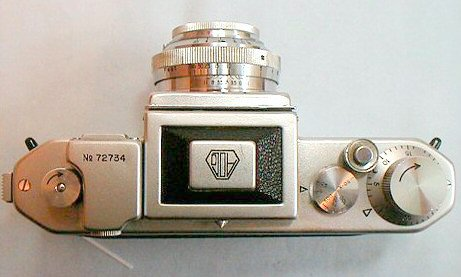
Top view: Asahiflex IIB Model I #72734

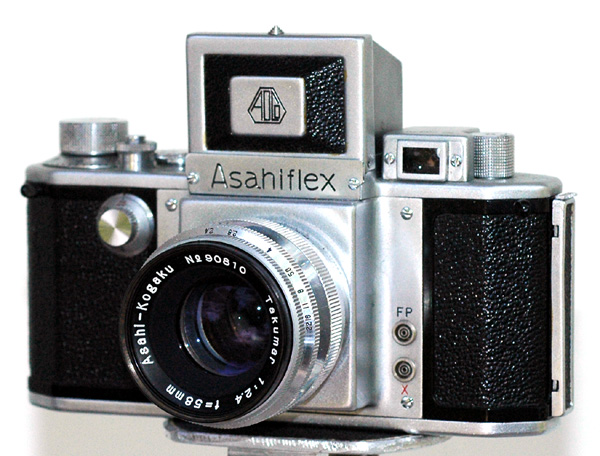
58mm f/2.4 Asahiflex IIA

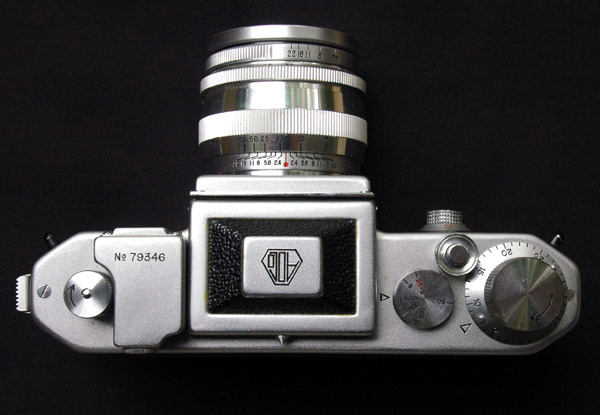
Top view: Asahiflex IIA #79346

=== Asahiflex I and IA ===
The Asahiflex I had a non-interchangeable waist-level viewfinder, with a direct optical viewfinder for eye-level use. Like the Praktiflex the Asahiflex I did not have a returning mirror (which means the mirror will only be back to its initial position to redirect light to the viewfinder for composing and range finding work after the operators had wound the film) and shutter speeds from 1/20 to 1/500 with additional (T)imer and (B)utton settings. The camera used the M37 screw mount, and the standard lens was a Takumar 50 mm f/3.5.

The Asahiflex I is equipped with an X-sync shutter speed for electronic flash; with some minor modifications for both X- and F-sync, allowing the use of flashbulbs, it was sold as the Asahiflex IA.

Both in the Praktiflex and the Asahiflex I, the mirror lifts just before the shutter is released. After the shutter closes, completing the exposure, the photographer must wind the film on and re-cock the shutter, dropping the reflex mirror back to its original position.

=== Asahiflex IIB and IIA ===
The Asahiflex IIB was released in 1954, with similar shutter speeds from 1/25 to 1/500 with T and B. With the IIB, a key advance was made, the quick-return mirror. It was the world's first pentaprism SLR camera with an instant return mirror. The problem of mirror black-out was one of the main problems with prior SLR designs, greatly reducing usability and leading to the greater popularity of the rangefinder. With the IIB there emerged the first practical quick-return mirror, a vital innovation and one which was quickly adopted by other manufacturers. In the United States, this camera was bundled with the 50 mm Takumar and sold through Sears as the Tower 23. In addition, a faster 58 mm f/2.4 Takumar was available.

With the final model in the series, the IIA, the Asahiflex gained slow speeds of 1/10, 1/5, and 1/2, controlled by a dial mounted on the front of the body. It was bundled with the faster 58 mm f/2.4 Takumar and sold by Sears as the Tower 22.

== See also ==
- Pentax
- Pentax cameras
- History of the single-lens reflex camera
