= Instant return mirror =

In photography, the single-lens reflex camera (SLR) is provided with a mirror to redirect light from the picture taking lens to the viewfinder prior to releasing the shutter for composing and focusing an image. When the shutter is released, the mirror swings up and away allowing the exposure of the photographic medium and instantly returns after the exposure. No SLR camera before 1954 had this feature, although the mirror on some early SLR cameras was entirely operated by the force exerted on the shutter release and only returned when the finger pressure was released. The Asahiflex II, released by Japanese company Asahi (Pentax) in 1954, was the world's first SLR camera with an instant return mirror.
