= Pentax K-1 =

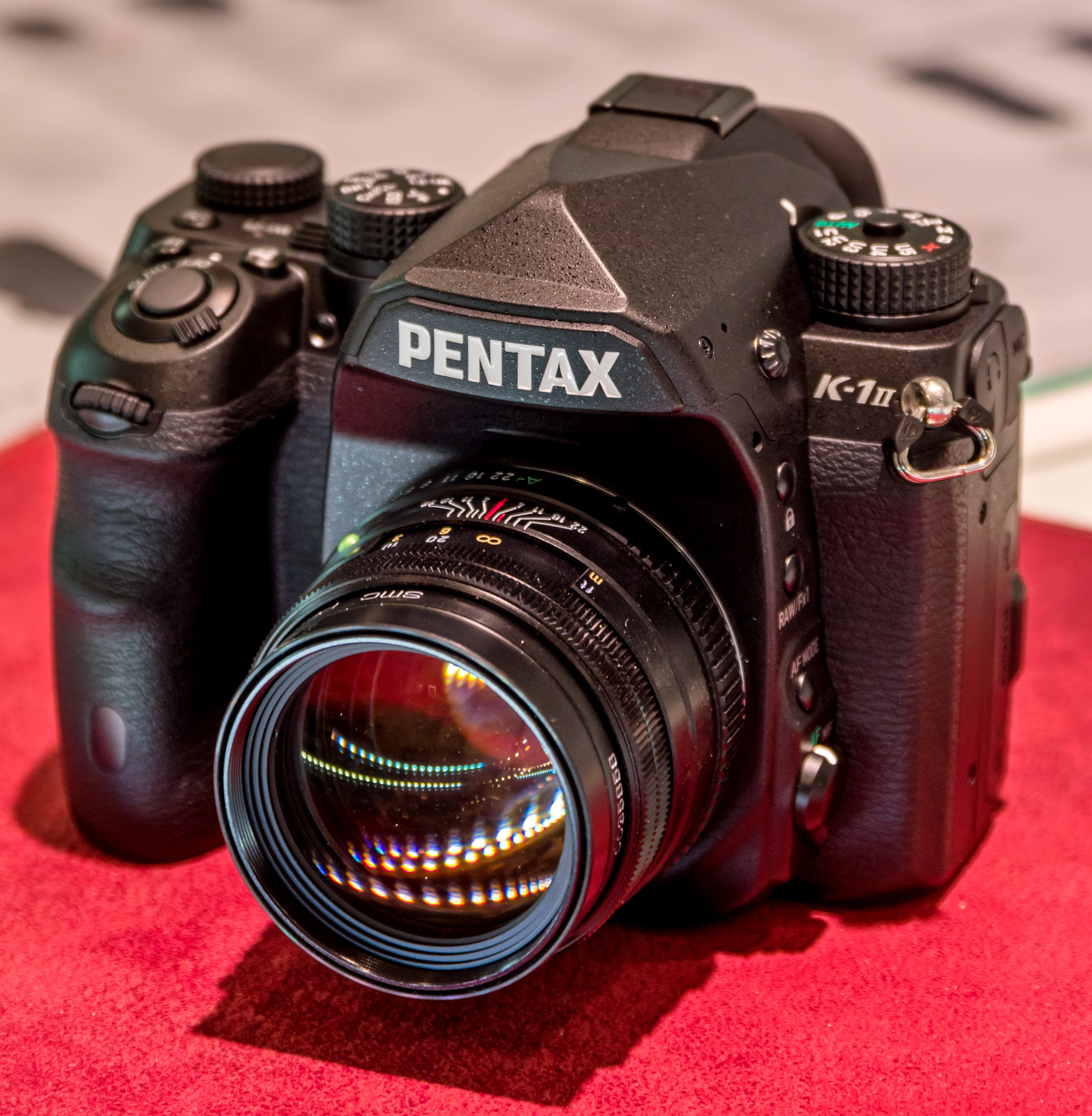

Overview
- Maker: Ricoh Imaging
- Type: Digital single-lens reflex camera
- Released: April 2016
- Intro price: US$1799.95

Lens
- Lens mount: Pentax KAF2

Sensor/medium
- Sensor: CMOS
- Sensor size: 35.9×24 mm (35 mm full-frame)
- Sensor maker: Sony Semiconductor Manufacturing Corporation
- Maximum resolution: 7360×4912 (36 megapixels) in full-frame mode 4800×3200 (15 megapixels) in APS-C mode
- Film speed: ISO 100–204800 in 1, ½, or ⅓ EV steps
- Recording medium: Dual SD/SDHC/SDXC card slots with UHS-I support

Focusing
- Focus modes: Single, continuous, and manual; spot, single-point selection, expanded-area (three sizes), zone select, 33-point automatic
- Focus areas: 33 points, 25 cross-type (SAFOX 12)

Exposure/metering
- Exposure modes: Fully automatic, program, aperture priority, shutter priority, sensitivity priority, aperture and shutter priority, manual, bulb, X-sync shutter speed, five User presets
- Exposure metering: 86,000-pixel RGB metering sensor with Real-Time Scene Analysis System
- Metering modes: Multi-segment, center-weighted, spot

Flash
- Flash synchronization: 1/200 s X-sync

Shutter
- Shutter: Vertical-travel focal-plane shutter; rated for 300,000 actuations
- Shutter speed range: 1/8000 s to 30 s in ½ or ⅓ EV steps, from 10 s to 20 min in bulb timer mode
- Continuous shooting: 4.4 fps in full-frame mode 6.5 fps in APS-C mode

Viewfinder
- Viewfinder: Eye-level pentaprism, 100% coverage, 0.70× magnification with 50 mm lens

Image processing
- Image processor: PRIME IV
- White balance: Yes

General
- Video recording: H.264/MPEG-4 AVC; 1920×1080 at 60i/50i/30p/25p/24p, 1280×720 at 60p/50p
- LCD screen: 3.2 inch cross-tilt LCD with 1,037,000 dots
- Battery: D-LI90 lithium-ion battery
- Optional battery packs: D-BG6 battery grip accepts additional D-LI90 battery or 6 AA (R6) batteries
- AV port: HDMI Type D
- Data port: USB 2.0 Micro-B
- Body features: Magnesium-alloy body on stainless-steel chassis; weather-sealed with 87 seals and cold-proof to −10 °C
- Weight: 1,010 g (36 oz) with battery and memory card 925 g (32.6 oz) body only
- Made in: Philippines

Footnotes
- integrated GPS receiver LEDs on lens mount, display and memory slots

The Pentax K-1 is the first production Pentax full-frame digital SLR camera. As the flagship model of the Pentax K-mount system, it includes several new and improved features, including a five-axis SR II in-body image stabilization system, newly designed flexible tilt articulating screen mounted on four metal struts allowing for rotation about the optical axis in addition to upward and downward tilt, and improved autofocus and metering systems.

In September 2026 Ricoh announced that the K-1 ii and all other currently produced K-mount DSLRs would be discontinued, with the intention to develop successor models in the near future

== History ==
The camera was officially announced on February 5, 2016, launched on February 17, 2016 and first shipped on April 28, 2016.

Ricoh has continued to update the camera after release through free downloadable firmware updates. These have added features including, in v1.40, a night vision mode and a timer for bulb mode.

=== Limited Edition ===
A Silver Limited Edition was announced on 24 August 2017, with 2000 units available worldwide.

=== K-1 II ===
On 22 February 2018, Ricoh announced the Pentax K-1 Mark II with availability from the end of April 2018. Changes and improvements are the use of the newer imaging processing unit from the KP model as well as faster and more accurate autofocus.

=== Upgrade Service ===
In 2018, Pentax offered an upgrade for owners of the K-1 which replaces the mainboard and includes the Image Processing Unit of the K-1 II.

== Reception ==
External image
- Pentax K-1 sample, review and user images, >20MPix. Google Image search

The K-1 achieved the German iF Design Award 2017 and Winner status in the German Design Award 2018.

| Type | Sensor | Class | 2003 | 2004 | 2005 | 2006 | | 2007 | 2008 | 2009 | 2010 | 2011 | 2012 | 2013 | 2014 | 2015 | 2016 | 2017 | 2018 | 2019 | 2020 | 2021 | 2022 | 2023 | 2024 | 2025 |
| DSLR | MF | Professional | | | | | | | | | | 645D | | | | 645Z | | | | | | | | | | |
| DSLR | FF | Professional | | | | | | | | | | | | | | | | K-1 | | K-1 II | | | | | | |
| DSLR | APS-C | High-end | | | | | | | | | | | | | | | K-3 II | | | | | | K-3 III | | | |
| DSLR | APS-C | High-end | | | | | | | | | | | | | K-3 | | | | | | | | | | | |
| DSLR | APS-C | Advanced | | | | | | | | | K-7 | K-5 | | K-5 II / K-5 IIs | | | | | | | | | | | | |
| DSLR | APS-C | Advanced | | *ist D | | | K10D | | K20D | | | | | | | | | KP | | | | | | | | |
| DSLR | APS-C | Midrange | | | | | K100D | 100DS | K200D | | | | | K-30 | K-50 | | | K-70 | | | | | | KF | | |
| DSLR | APS-C | Entry-level | | | *ist DS | *ist DS2 | | | | | | K-r | | | K-500 | K-S2 | | | | | | | | | | |
| DSLR | APS-C | Entry-level | | | *ist DL | DL2 | K110D | | | K-m/K2000 | K-x | | | | | K-S1 | | | | | | | | | | |
| MILC | APS-C | K-mount | | | | | | | | | | | K-01 | | | | | | | | | | | | | |
| MILC | 1/1.7" | Q-mount | | | | | | | | | | | | | Q7 | | | | | | | | | | | |
| MILC | 1/1.7" | Q-mount | | | | | | | | | | | | | | Q-S1 | | | | | | | | | | |
| MILC | 1/2.3" | Q-mount | | | | | | | | | | | Q | Q10 | | | | | | | | | | | | |
| DSLR | Prototypes | | MZ-D (2000); 645D Prototype (2006); AP 50th Anniv. (2007) | | | | | | | | | | | | | | | | | | | | | | | |
| Type | Sensor | Class | | | | | | | | | | | | | | | | | | | | | | | | |
| Type | Sensor | Class | 2003 | 2004 | 2005 | 2006 | | 2007 | 2008 | 2009 | 2010 | 2011 | 2012 | 2013 | 2014 | 2015 | 2016 | 2017 | 2018 | 2019 | 2020 | 2021 | 2022 | 2023 | 2024 | 2025 |
