= Pentax K-50 =

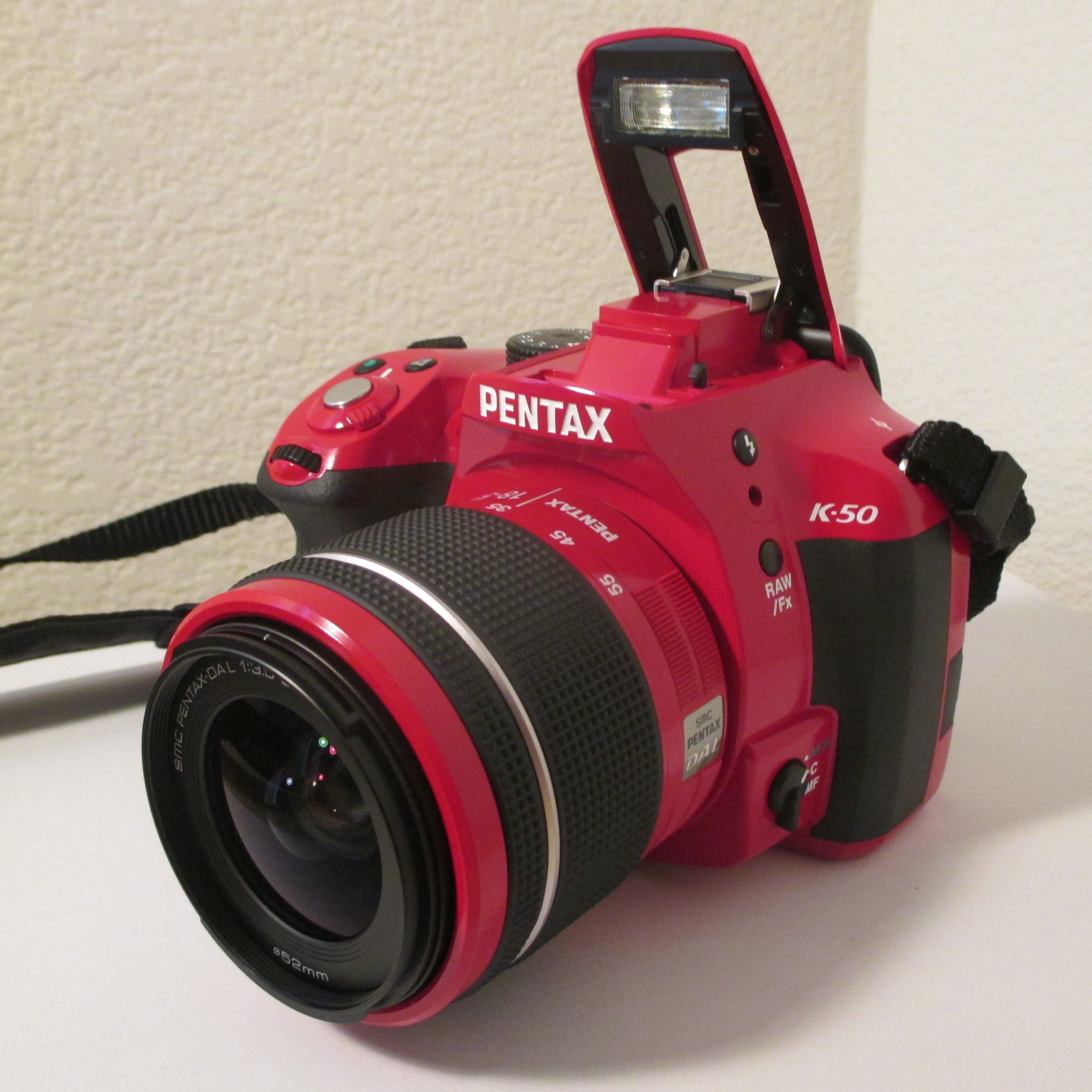
- Pentax K-50 with pop-up flash extended

Overview
- Maker: Pentax
- Type: Digital single-lens reflex camera

Lens
- Lens mount: Interchangeable Pentax K_{AF3} and K_{AF2} mount compatible with Pentax auto-aperture lenses; older lenses supported in stop-down metering mode

Sensor/medium
- Sensor: APS-C 23.7×15.7 mm CMOS sensor
- Maximum resolution: 4928 × 3264 pixels 16.3 million effective pixels
- Film speed: ISO 100–51 200 in 1, 0.5 or 0.3 EV steps
- Recording medium: SD, SDHC, SDXC (Eye-Fi compatible)

Exposure/metering
- Exposure metering: TTL open-aperture metering with choice of: 77-segment evaluative, center-weighted & spot metering

Flash
- Flash: Built-in retractable P-TTL auto pop-up flash. 1/180s sync speed.

Shutter
- Shutter speed range: 30-1/6000 s, Bulb

Viewfinder
- Viewfinder: Eye-level pentaprism, near-100% coverage, 0.92x magnification

General
- LCD screen: 3", 921k pixels with AR coating, adjustable for brightness and color
- Battery: Lithium-Ion D-Li109 rechargeable battery or four AA batteries (with optional AA battery holder D-BH109)
- Weight: With battery and SD card: 650 g (1.43 lb); Without battery: 590 g (1.30 lb)
- Made in: Philippines

The Pentax K-50 is a 16.3-megapixel mid-level Pentax digital single-lens reflex camera, announced on 12 June 2013. It is the direct successor to the Pentax K-30 model, both of which are weather-sealed.

The main differences over the Pentax K-30 include a more traditional body design, 120 available body color combinations, higher max ISO range (up to 51,200), compatibility with Eye-Fi cards and an improved kit lens (Pentax K-30 included the DA L 18-55mm lens, while Pentax K-50 bundles a water-resistant version, the DA L 18-55mm WR, both with plastic mounts).

== Among APS-C mid-range DSLRs ==
Among competing APS-C mid-range DSLRs, the Pentax K-50 has the smallest body, although it is 4 mm wider than its nearest rival, the Nikon D5300. The body is made from stainless steel and polycarbonate resin, as is the Canon EOS 700D. The Pentax K-50 has an onboard microphone but lacks the audio-in port of most comparable cameras, limiting its usefulness to videographers. Pentax is the only company to include a weather-resistant kit lens, Pentax K-50 with DA L 18-55mm f3.5-5.6 WR, while the higher-model Pentax K-3 offers the 18-135mm F3.5-5.6 WR in one of its kits. The Pentax K-50 is available for around $300 (body only) and less than $400 with kit lens, as of the end of July 2015, which puts it at a very low price point compared to its competition (Canon EOS 70D, Canon EOS 700D, Nikon D5300, Nikon D7100 and Pentax K-3).

== Pentax K-500 ==
The Pentax K-500 is an entry-level sibling of the Pentax K-50, sharing almost all of its features. The main differences between the two cameras are the K-500's lack of colored body options (only black), electronic level, weather sealing, and focus point visualisation through the optical viewfinder. As a consequence of the lack of weather sealing, this camera is bundled with the non-weather-sealed DA L 18-55mm kit lens, and most variants of the camera come with an AA battery holder included as opposed to the D-Li109 rechargeable Li-ion battery included with the K-50. However, the camera is still compatible with the aforementioned Li-ion battery.

Type	Sensor	Class	2003	2004	2005	2006		2007	2008	2009	2010	2011	2012	2013	2014	2015	2016	2017	2018	2019	2020	2021	2022	2023	2024	2025
DSLR	MF	Professional										645D				645Z										
DSLR	FF	Professional																K-1		K-1 II						
DSLR	APS-C	High-end															K-3 II						K-3 III			
DSLR	APS-C	High-end													K-3											
DSLR	APS-C	Advanced									K-7	K-5		K-5 II / K-5 IIs												
DSLR	APS-C	Advanced		*ist D			K10D		K20D									KP								
DSLR	APS-C	Midrange					K100D	100DS	K200D					K-30	K-50			K-70						KF		
DSLR	APS-C	Entry-level			*ist DS	*ist DS2						K-r			K-500	K-S2										
DSLR	APS-C	Entry-level			*ist DL	DL2	K110D			K-m/K2000	K-x					K-S1										
MILC	APS-C	K-mount											K-01													
MILC	1/1.7"	Q-mount													Q7											
MILC	1/1.7"	Q-mount														Q-S1										
MILC	1/2.3"	Q-mount											Q	Q10												
DSLR	Prototypes		MZ-D (2000); 645D Prototype (2006); AP 50th Anniv. (2007)																							
Type	Sensor	Class																								
Type	Sensor	Class	2003	2004	2005	2006		2007	2008	2009	2010	2011	2012	2013	2014	2015	2016	2017	2018	2019	2020	2021	2022	2023	2024	2025
