= Pentax K-3 =

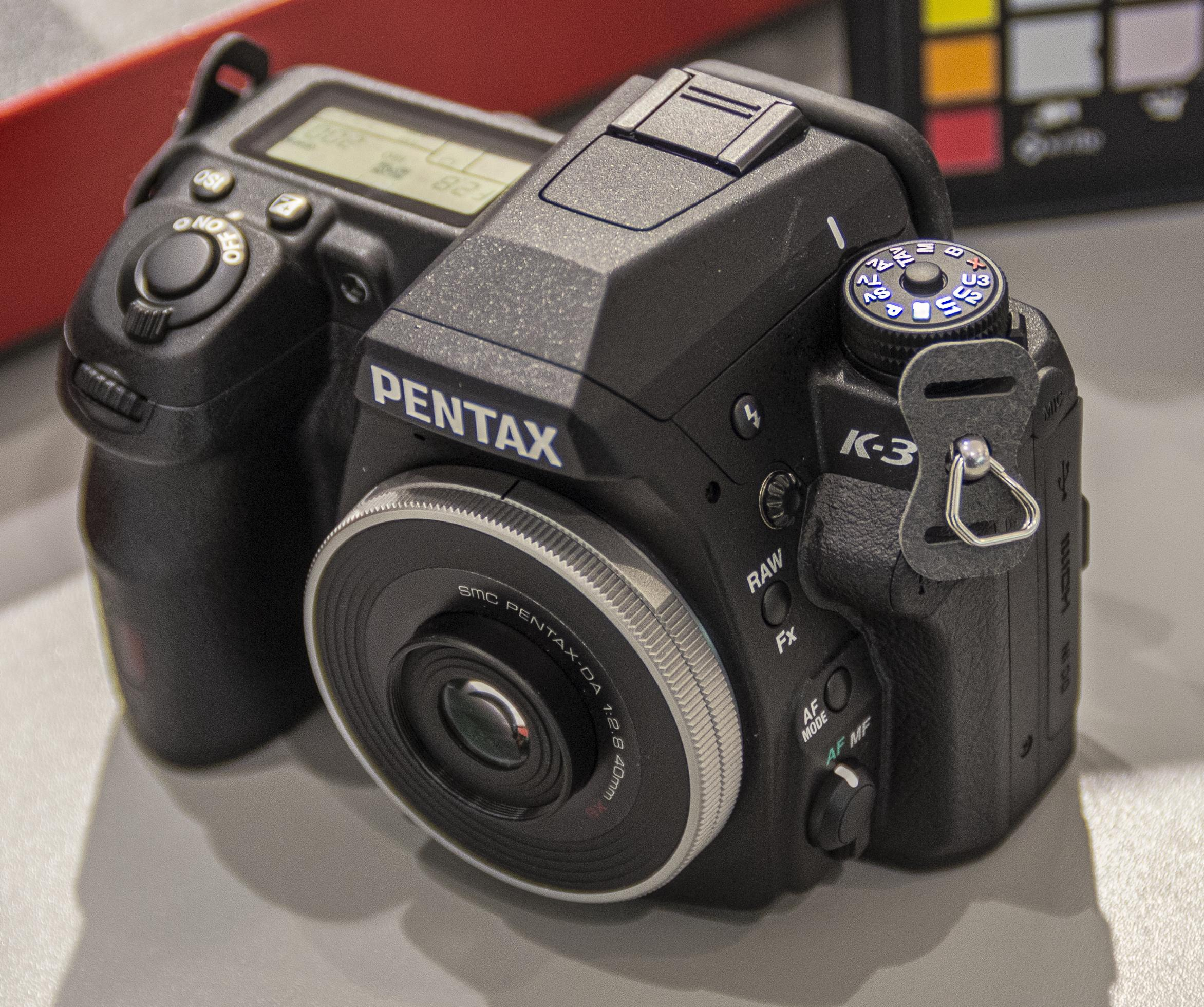

Overview
- Maker: Ricoh
- Type: Digital single-lens reflex camera

Lens
- Lens: Interchangeable Pentax K_{AF3} and K_{AF2} mount compatible with Pentax auto-aperture lenses; older lenses supported in stop-down metering mode

Sensor/medium
- Sensor: APS-C 23.7 × 15.7 mm CMOS sensor
- Maximum resolution: 24.71 megapixels (6016×4000)
- Film speed: ISO 100–51,200 in 1, 1/2, or 1/3 EV steps
- Recording medium: 2 slots for SD/SDHC/SDXC; dedicated Flucard for wireless tethering available

Exposure/metering
- Exposure modes: Green (fully automatic), program, aperture priority, shutter priority, sensitivity priority, aperture and shutter priority, manual, bulb, X-sync shutter speed, three User presets.
- Exposure metering: 86,000-pixel RGB metering sensor with Real-Time Scene Analysis System
- Metering modes: Multi-segment, Center-weighted, Spot

Flash
- Flash: Onboard pop-up flash; hot shoe for P-TTL flash units with high-speed sync support; PC socket for studio flashes; 1/180 s X-sync speed

Shutter
- Shutter speed range: 1/8000 – 30 s, Bulb
- Continuous shooting: Up to 8.3 fps for 60 JPEG or 23 raw images

Viewfinder
- Viewfinder: Eye-level pentaprism, 100% coverage, 0.95× magnification

General
- LCD screen: 3.2 in (81 mm), 1,037,000 dots (720×480 RGB pixels)
- Battery: D-LI90 lithium-ion rechargeable battery
- Optional battery packs: D-BG5 battery grip accepts additional D-LI90 battery or 6 AA (R6) batteries
- Dimensions: 131×97×73 mm (5.2×3.8×2.9 in)
- Weight: With battery: 800 g (28 oz); Without battery: 715 g (25.2 oz)
- Made in: Philippines

The Pentax K-3 is a 24-megapixel Pentax high-end digital single-lens reflex camera with an APS-C sensor, announced on 7 October 2013. The Pentax K-3 is the successor to both the K-5 II and K-5 IIs models, which have a 16-megapixel sensor. The K-5 II (and most other cameras of its time) had an optical low pass filter or anti-aliasing (AA) filter that can prevent the appearance of moire patterning on the captured image. This filter reduces the sharpness of the image, so Pentax also produced the K-5 IIs which omitted this filter. In the K-3, Pentax obviated the need for providing two separate models by including a selectable AA filter "simulator". This mechanism vibrates the sensor when switched on, slightly blurring the image in a way that replaces the function of the optical AA filter, providing the same benefit as the filter in the K-5 II and other cameras with an optical AA filter. When the AA simulator is disabled, the sensor records a sharper image, as in the K-5 IIs.

The Pentax K-3 was also the first camera to support the Pentax FluCard for wireless remote capture and download of images.

The Pentax K-3 is a mid-size DSLR with a weather-sealed magnesium alloy body, and is priced at a relatively similar level to the newer upper-entry level Nikon D5500 DSLR and $300 cheaper than the newer mid-range Nikon D7200 DSLR. The Pentax K-3 was ranked #2 in a comparison of mid-size DSLR class, was class-leading in image quality for portrait, street, daily and landscape photography, and ranked only slightly lower for sport photography. In-body stabilization also gives the Pentax K-3 an advantage, but its 800-gram weight is slightly more than average for a mid-size DSLR.

== Limited editions ==
When the K-3 was originally announced, Ricoh made available a Premium Silver Edition that included the camera body and battery grip with a silver paint finish as well as an exclusive red leather neck strap. According to Ricoh, this would match the silver versions of Pentax HD DA Limited lenses. In July 2014, Ricoh announced the Prestige Edition, which included a K-3 and battery grip in a "gunmetal gray" finish as well as two batteries and black artificial leather neck strap, embossed with the lettering "2014 TIPA BEST DIGITAL SLR EXPERT" and the Pentax K-3 logo. Each edition was limited to 2000 units.

== Awards ==
The Pentax K-3 has won the TIPA Award "Best Digital SLR Expert" for 2014, and the EISA Photo Award 2014-2015 for Best Advanced DSLR.

== Gallery ==
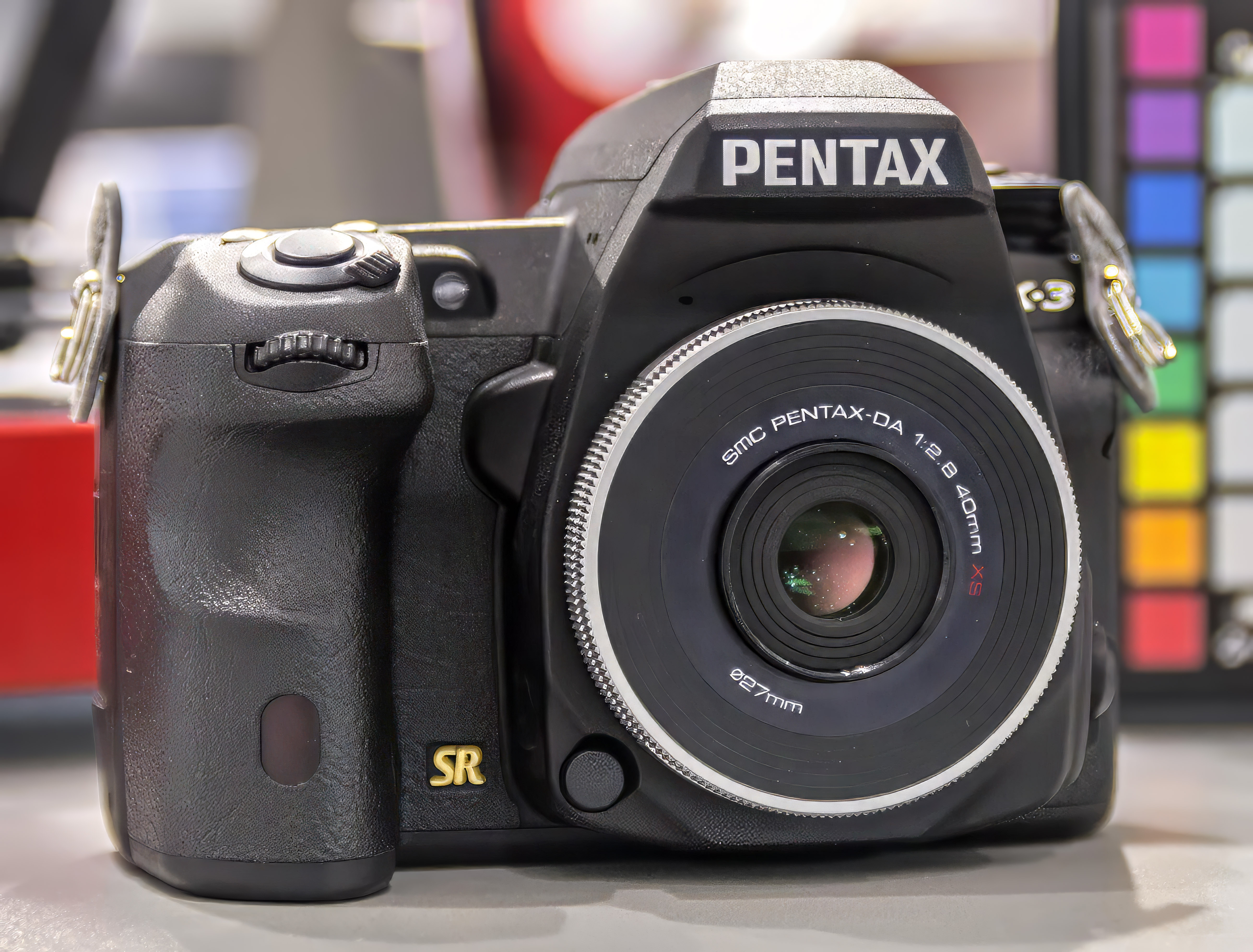

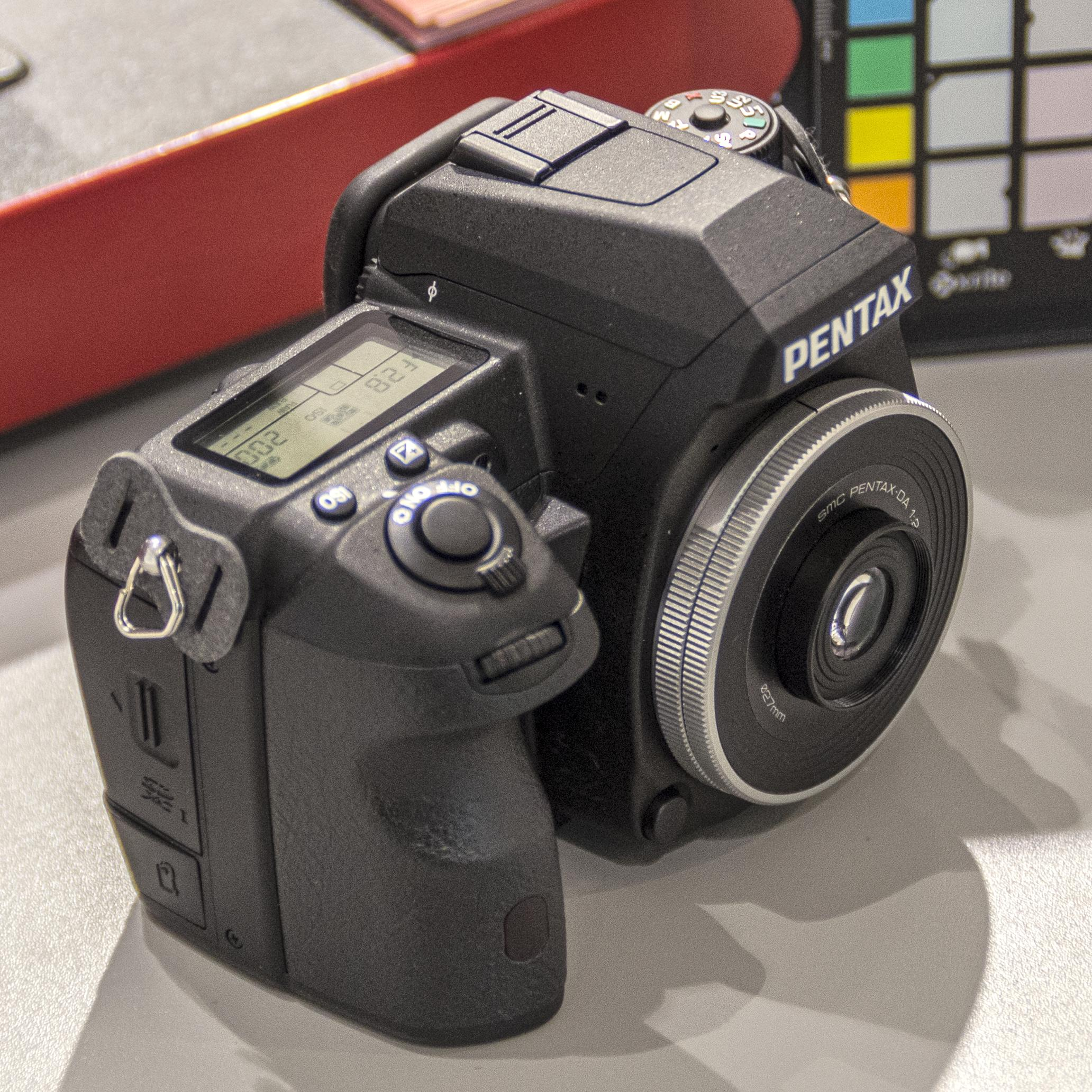

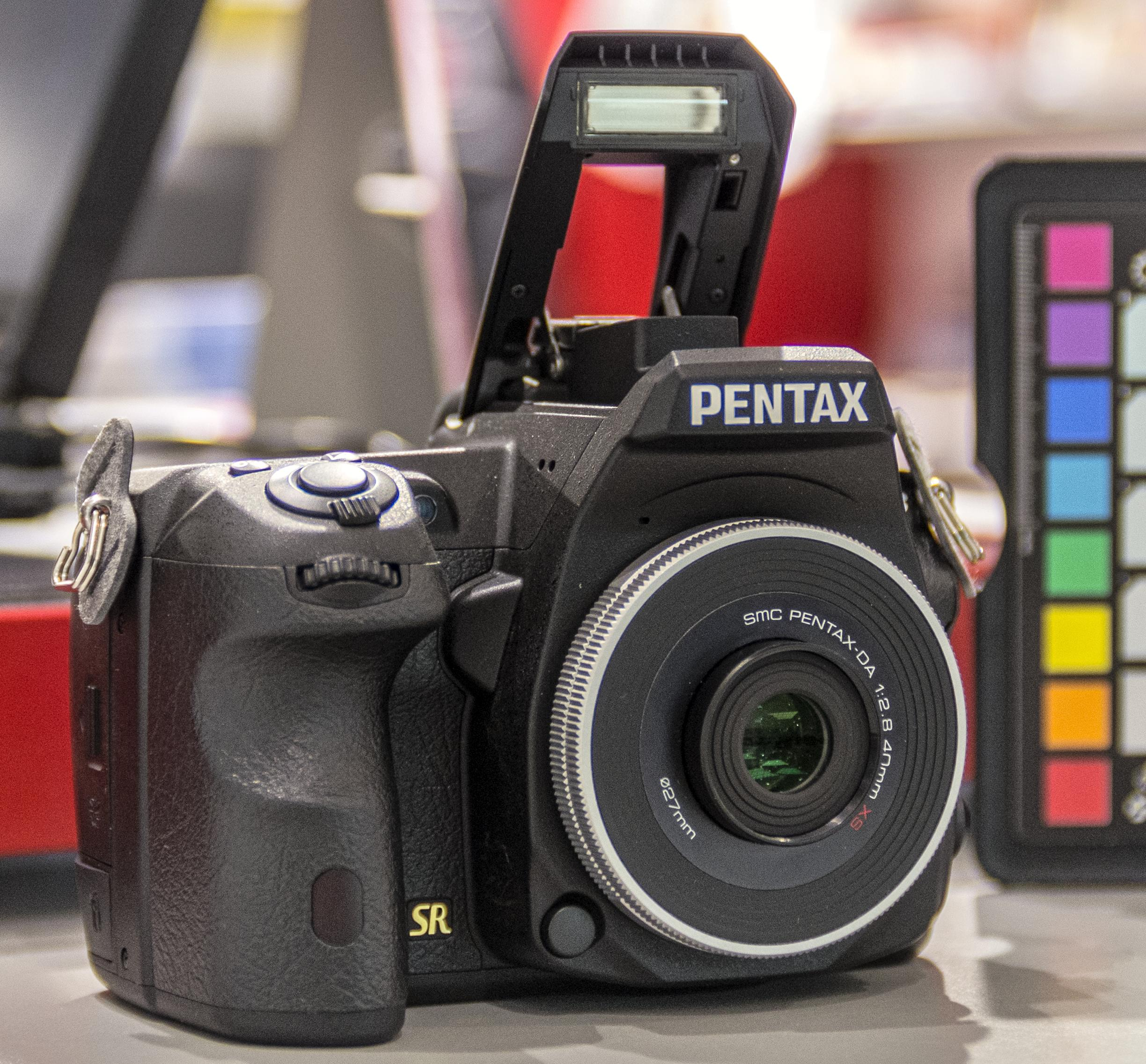

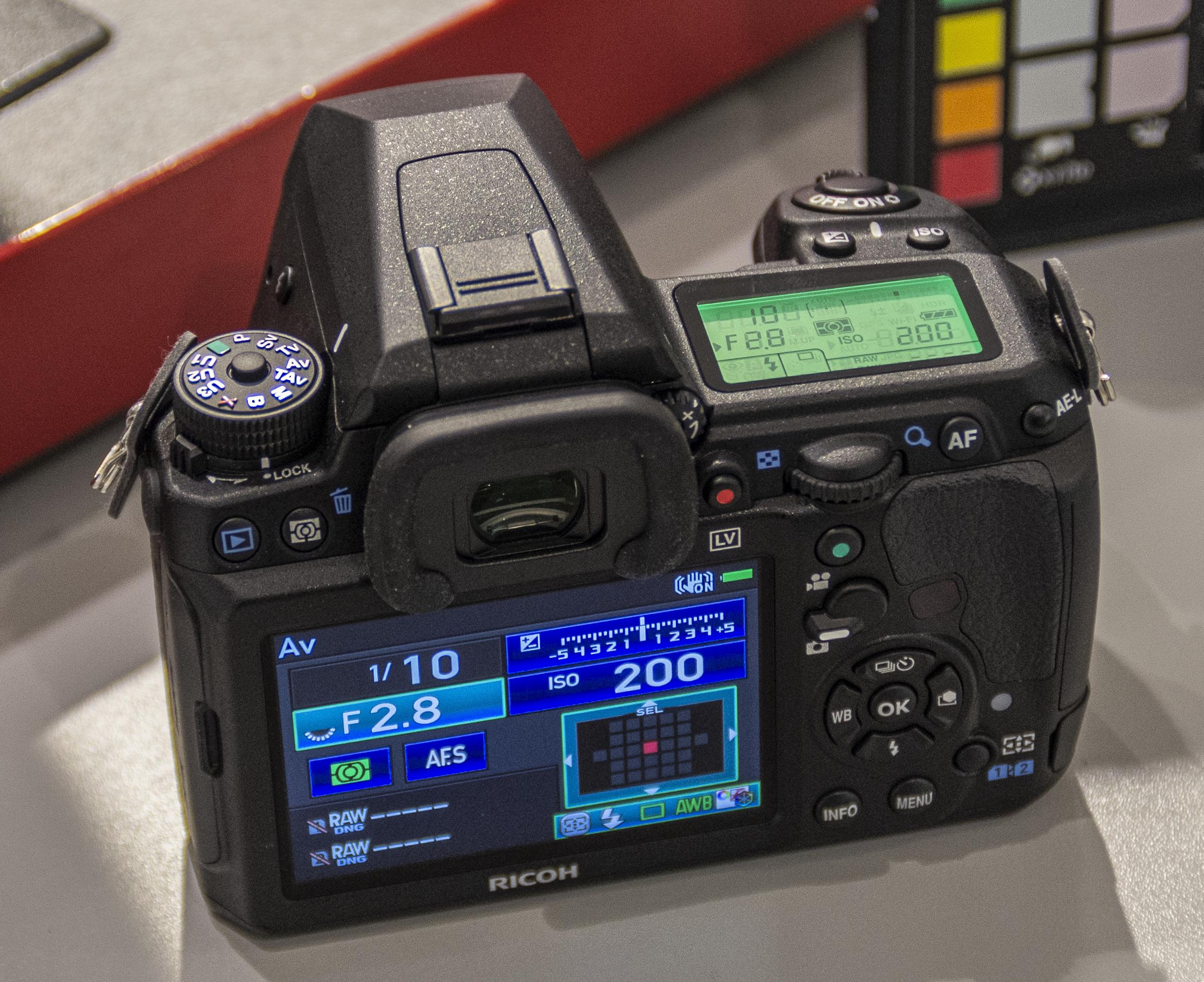

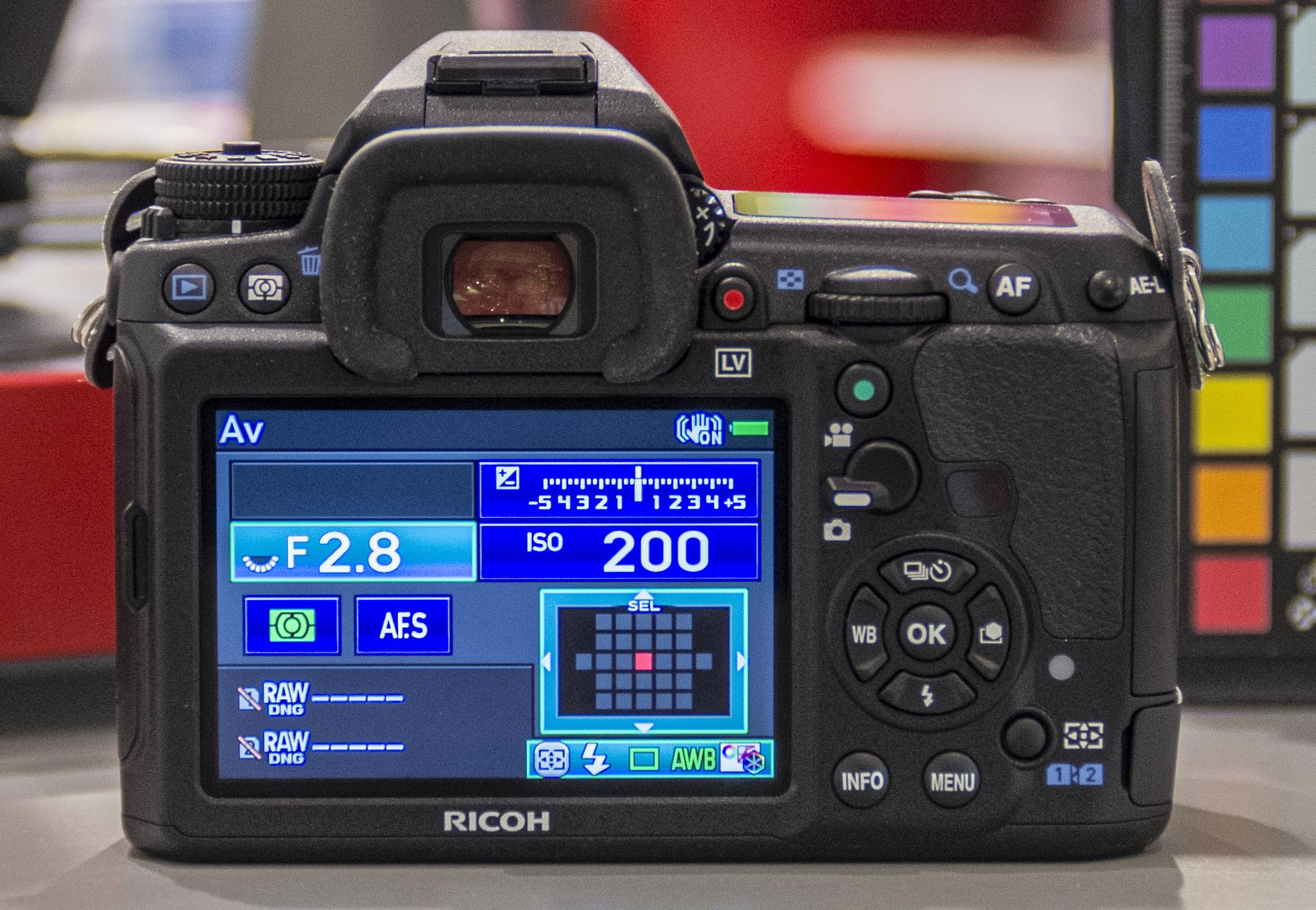

Type	Sensor	Class	2003	2004	2005	2006		2007	2008	2009	2010	2011	2012	2013	2014	2015	2016	2017	2018	2019	2020	2021	2022	2023	2024	2025
DSLR	MF	Professional										645D				645Z										
DSLR	FF	Professional																K-1		K-1 II						
DSLR	APS-C	High-end															K-3 II						K-3 III			
DSLR	APS-C	High-end													K-3											
DSLR	APS-C	Advanced									K-7	K-5		K-5 II / K-5 IIs												
DSLR	APS-C	Advanced		*ist D			K10D		K20D									KP								
DSLR	APS-C	Midrange					K100D	100DS	K200D					K-30	K-50			K-70						KF		
DSLR	APS-C	Entry-level			*ist DS	*ist DS2						K-r			K-500	K-S2										
DSLR	APS-C	Entry-level			*ist DL	DL2	K110D			K-m/K2000	K-x					K-S1										
MILC	APS-C	K-mount											K-01													
MILC	1/1.7"	Q-mount													Q7											
MILC	1/1.7"	Q-mount														Q-S1										
MILC	1/2.3"	Q-mount											Q	Q10												
DSLR	Prototypes		MZ-D (2000); 645D Prototype (2006); AP 50th Anniv. (2007)																							
Type	Sensor	Class																								
Type	Sensor	Class	2003	2004	2005	2006		2007	2008	2009	2010	2011	2012	2013	2014	2015	2016	2017	2018	2019	2020	2021	2022	2023	2024	2025
