= Pentax K-70 =

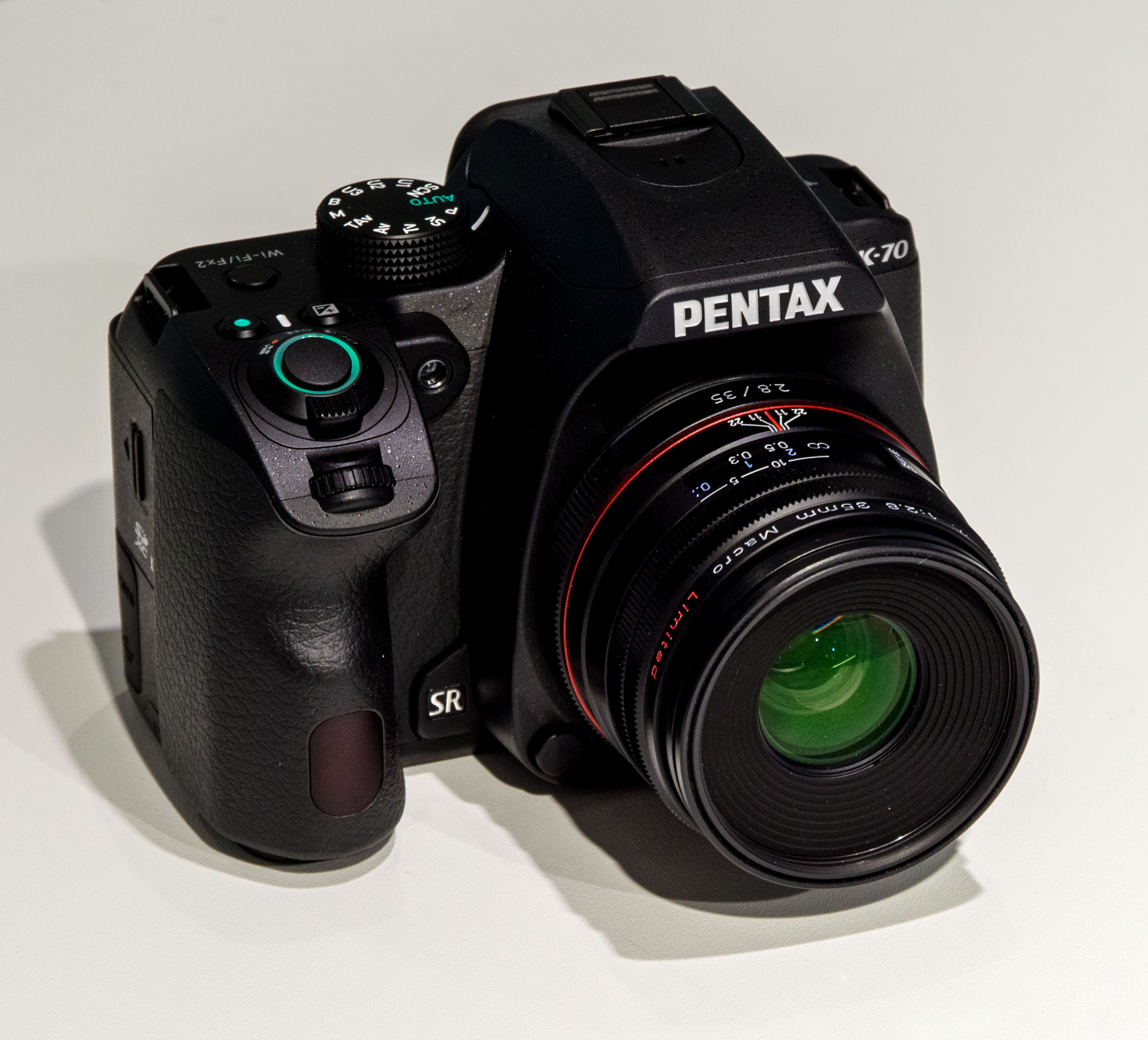

Overview
- Maker: Ricoh
- Type: Digital single-lens reflex camera
- Released: 2016
- Production: 2016–2022
- Intro price: $649

Lens
- Lens mount: Pentax K

Sensor/medium
- Sensor type: CMOS
- Sensor size: 23.5 x 15.6mm (APS-C type)
- Sensor maker: Sony
- Maximum resolution: 6000 x 4000 (24 megapixels)
- Film speed: ISO 100-102400
- Recording medium: SD, SDHC or SDXC memory card (UHS-I compatible)

Focusing
- Focus modes: Single AF (AF.S), Continuous AF (AF.C), Auto select AF (AF.A)
- Focus areas: 11 PDAF focus points (9 cross type)

Exposure/metering
- Exposure modes: Auto, Scene, Manual (M), Aperture Priority (Av), Shutter Priority (Tv), Aperture and Shutter Priority (TAv), Sensitivity Priority (Sv)
- Metering modes: Multi-segment, Center-weighted, and Spot metering

Flash
- Flash: Onboard pop-up flash; hot shoe for P-TTL flash units with high-speed sync support, 1/180 X-Sync speed

Shutter
- Shutter speeds: 1/6000s to 30s; up to 20 mins in bulb mode
- Continuous shooting: 6.0 frames per second

Viewfinder
- Viewfinder: Optical viewfinder
- Viewfinder magnification: 0.95
- Frame coverage: 100%

Image processing
- Image processor: PRIME MII
- White balance: Yes

General
- LCD screen: 3 inches with 921,000 dots
- AV port(s): USB 2.0 microB, HDMI (Type D), external power supply, external cable switch, Stereo microphone input
- Dimensions: 126 x 93 x 74mm (4.94 x 3.66 x 2.91 inches)
- Weight: 688 g (24 oz) including battery
- Made in: Philippines

Chronology
- Predecessor: Pentax K-50
- Successor: Pentax KF

The Pentax K-70 is a 24 megapixel compact APS-C digital SLR camera announced by Ricoh on June 8, 2016. In contrast to the previously introduced APS-C flagship K-3 II, it includes a flash, flip-out display and built-in WiFi. In common with that camera, the K-70 is capable of Pixel Shift Resolution images, which provide higher colour resolution and require the camera to be stationary. It is the first Pentax camera to also include on-sensor PDAF elements that support hybrid autofocus, enabling continuous autofocus during video capture.

Like its predecessors K-50 and K-S2, the Pentax K-70 is weather-sealed. Its price level and general features identify it as an upper entry level camera. In contrast to the flagship model, it lacks the second display and second memory card slot. It also uses a lower-specified imaging chip, the PRIME MII, but combines it with "a newly developed accelerator unit". As a Pentax APS-C first, a sensitivity of ISO 102,400 is available, and as a Pentax entry-level first, the camera features 14 bit sensor read-out.

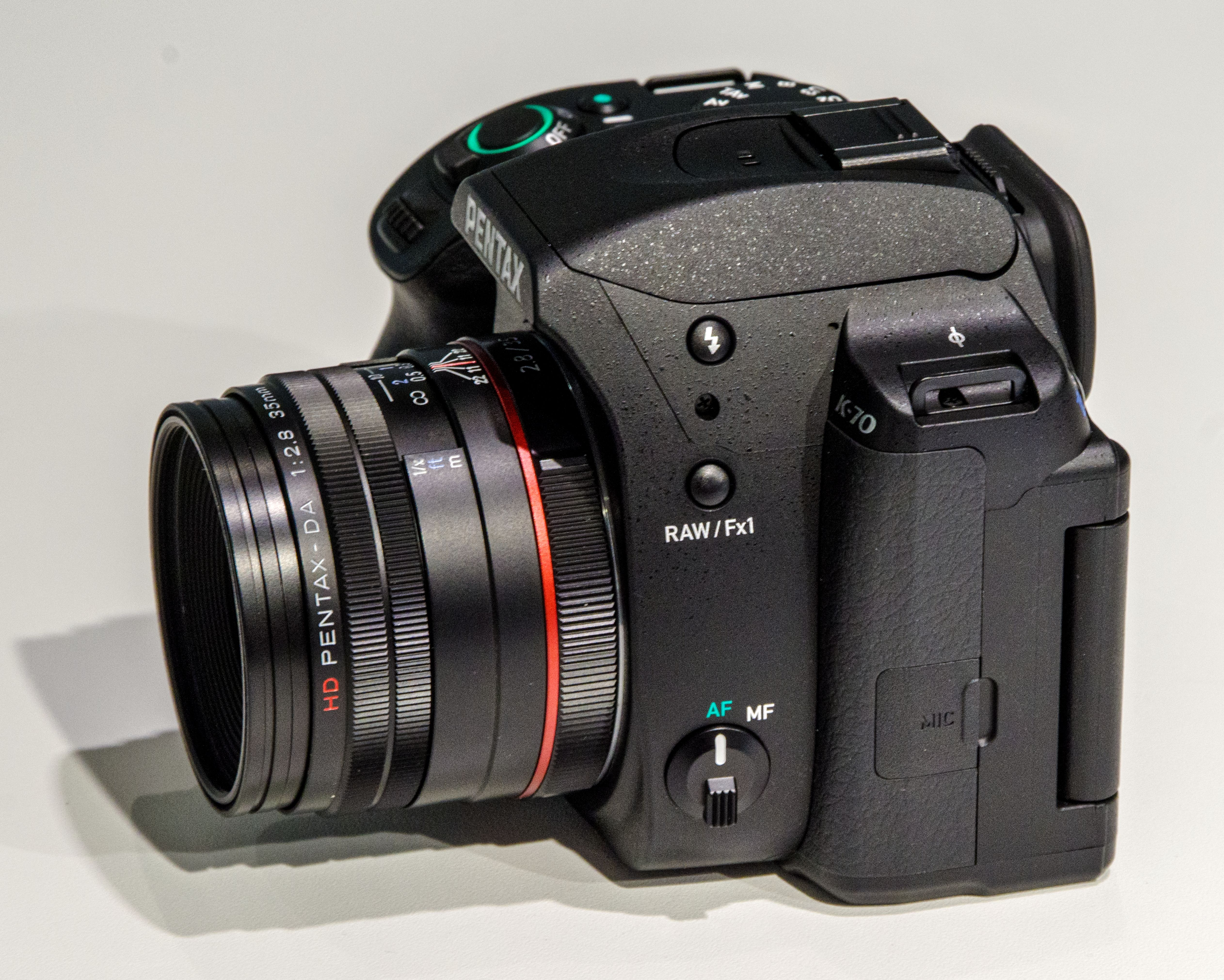

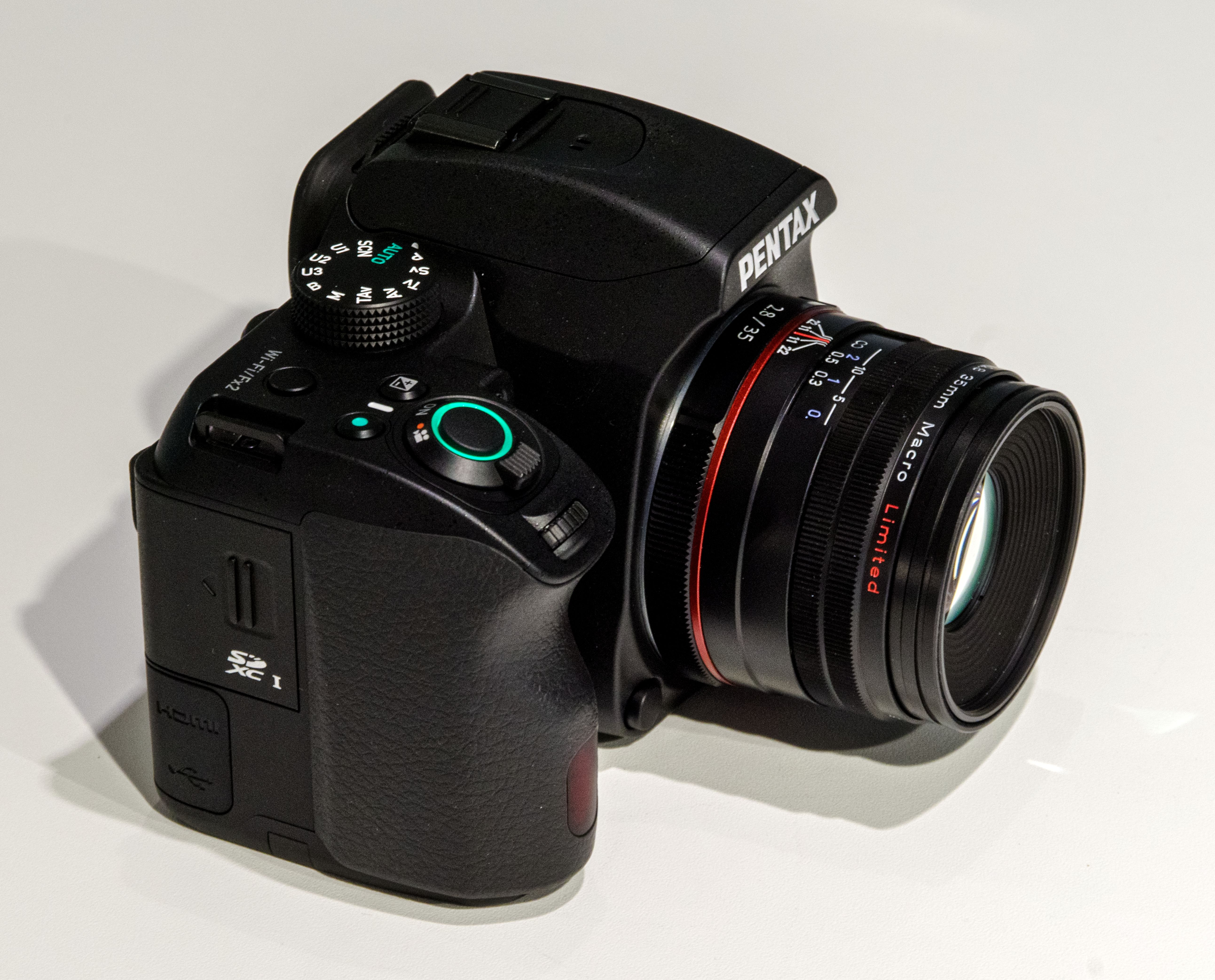

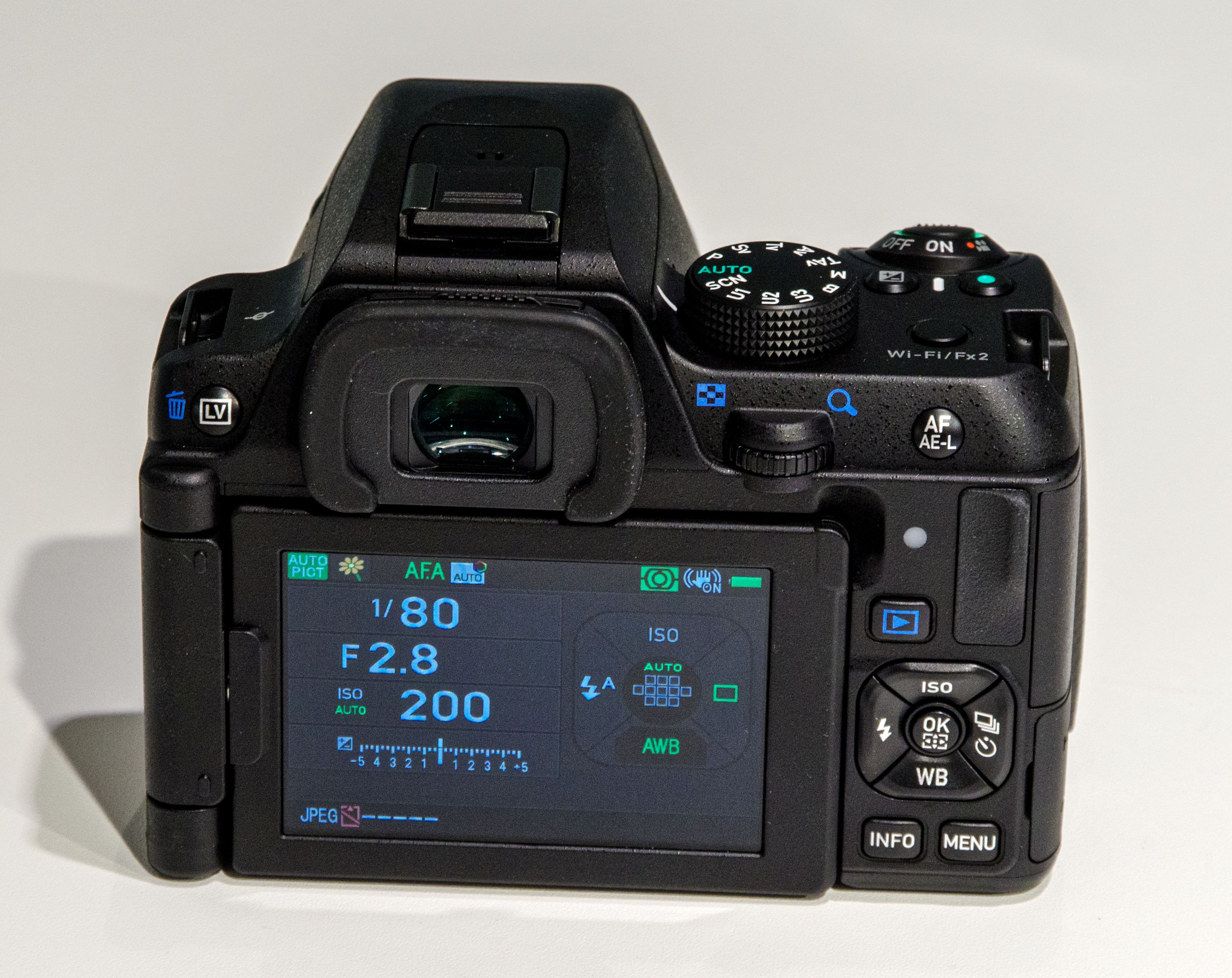

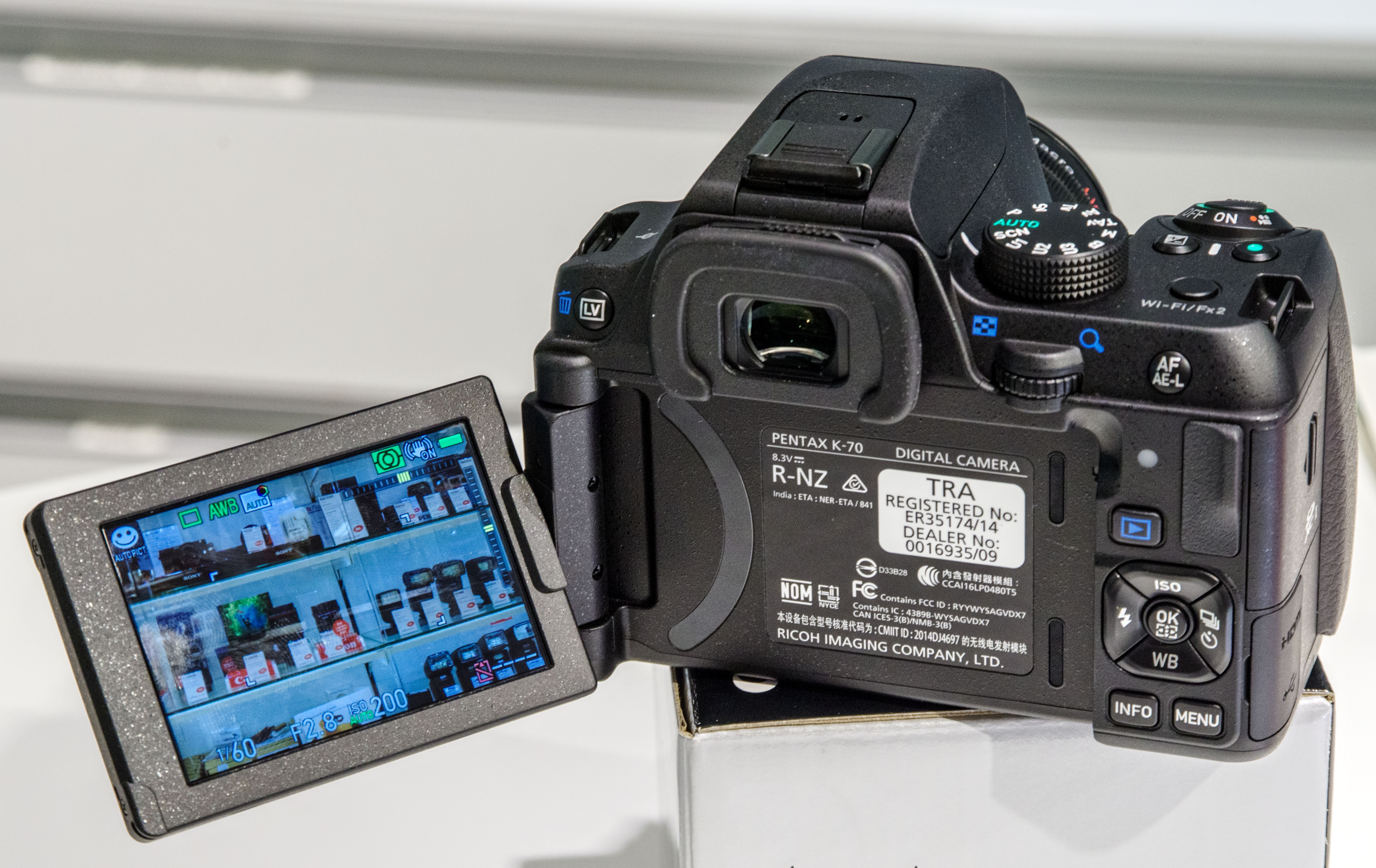

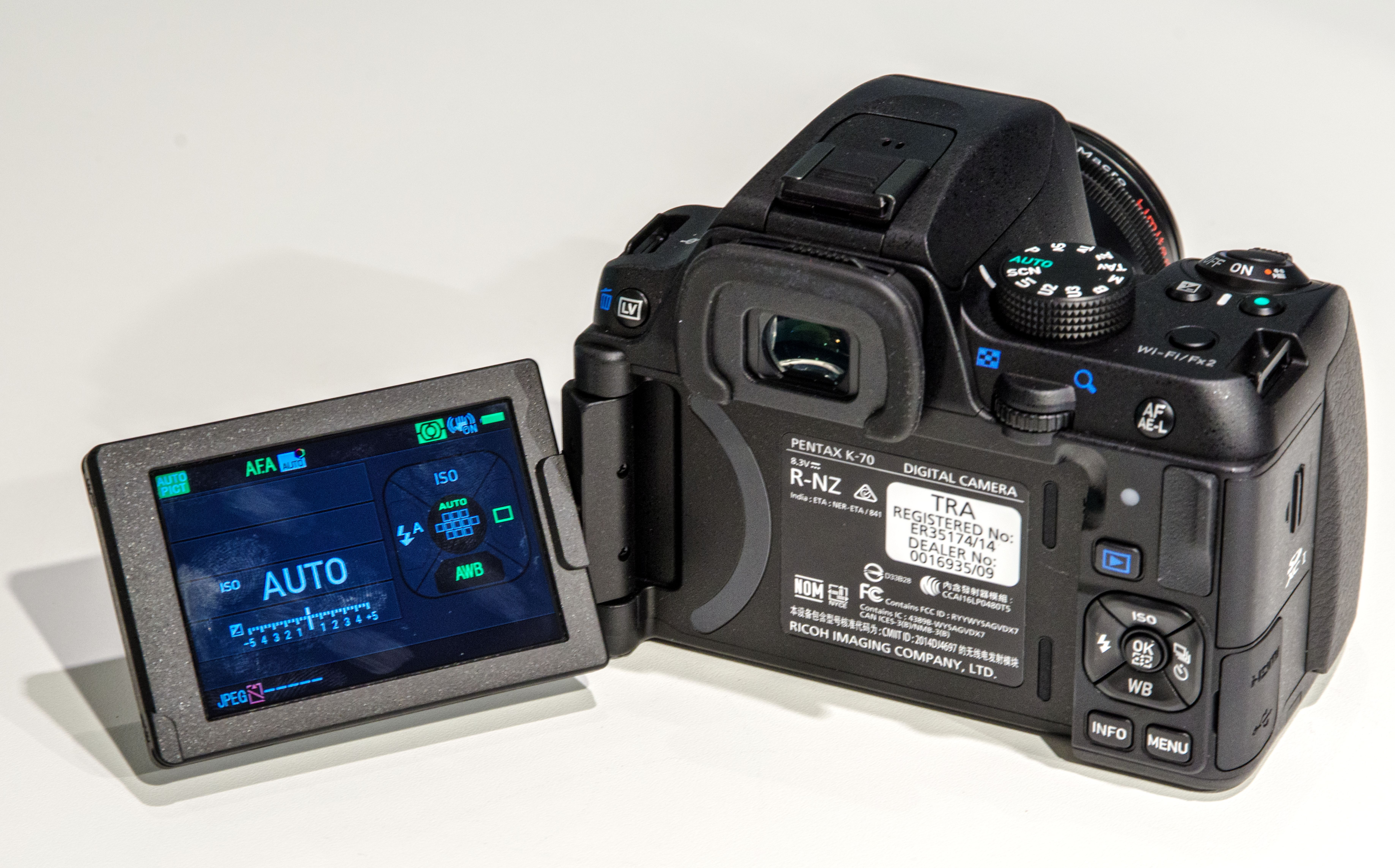

Type	Sensor	Class	2003	2004	2005	2006		2007	2008	2009	2010	2011	2012	2013	2014	2015	2016	2017	2018	2019	2020	2021	2022	2023	2024	2025
DSLR	MF	Professional										645D				645Z										
DSLR	FF	Professional																K-1		K-1 II						
DSLR	APS-C	High-end															K-3 II						K-3 III			
DSLR	APS-C	High-end													K-3											
DSLR	APS-C	Advanced									K-7	K-5		K-5 II / K-5 IIs												
DSLR	APS-C	Advanced		*ist D			K10D		K20D									KP								
DSLR	APS-C	Midrange					K100D	100DS	K200D					K-30	K-50			K-70						KF		
DSLR	APS-C	Entry-level			*ist DS	*ist DS2						K-r			K-500	K-S2										
DSLR	APS-C	Entry-level			*ist DL	DL2	K110D			K-m/K2000	K-x					K-S1										
MILC	APS-C	K-mount											K-01													
MILC	1/1.7"	Q-mount													Q7											
MILC	1/1.7"	Q-mount														Q-S1										
MILC	1/2.3"	Q-mount											Q	Q10												
DSLR	Prototypes		MZ-D (2000); 645D Prototype (2006); AP 50th Anniv. (2007)																							
Type	Sensor	Class																								
Type	Sensor	Class	2003	2004	2005	2006		2007	2008	2009	2010	2011	2012	2013	2014	2015	2016	2017	2018	2019	2020	2021	2022	2023	2024	2025
