= Nikon D750 =

Digital single-lens reflex camera

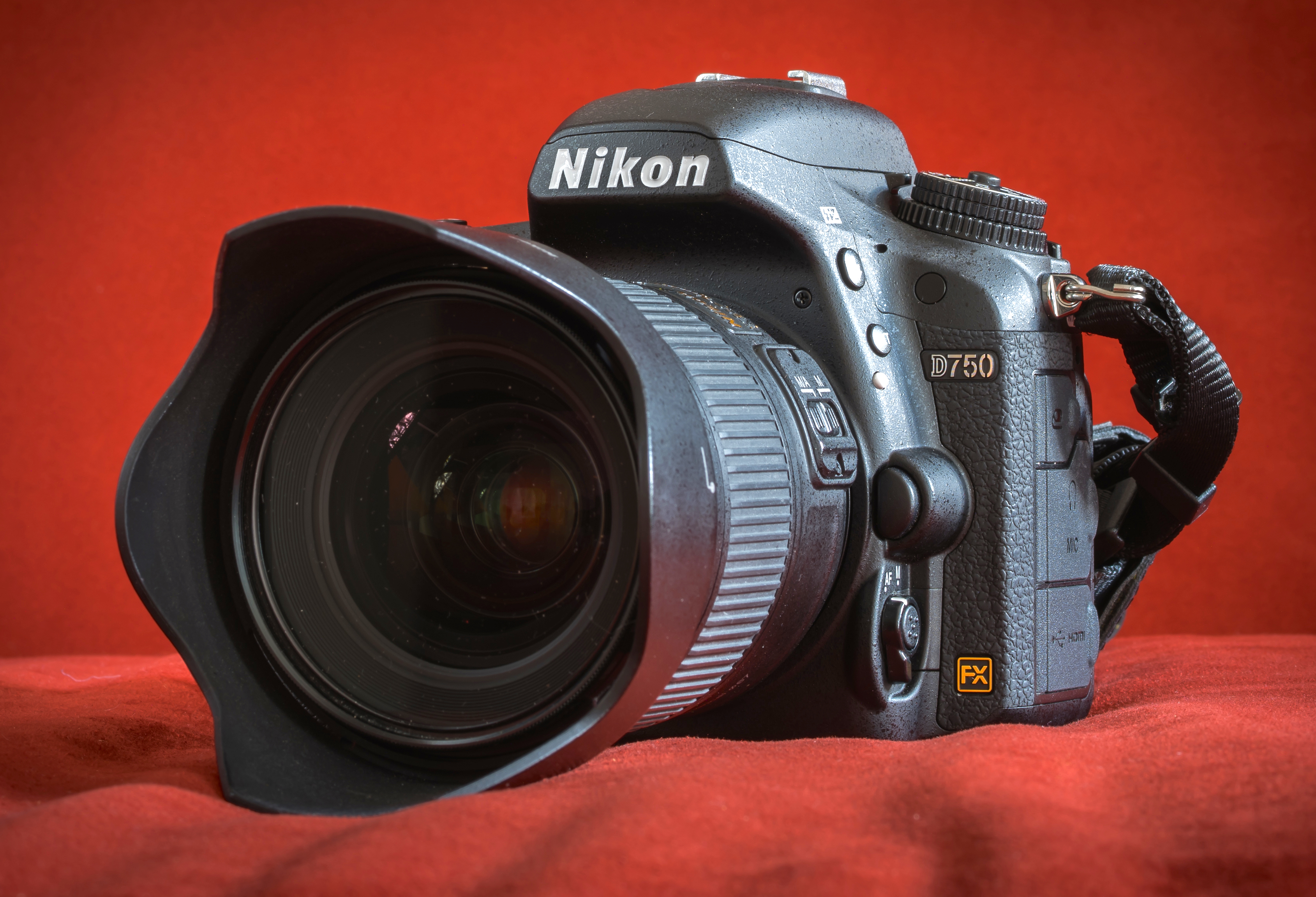

Overview
- Maker: Nikon
- Type: Digital single-lens reflex
- Released: 12 September 2014

Lens
- Lens mount: Nikon F-mount

Sensor/medium
- Sensor type: CMOS
- Sensor size: 35.9 x 24 mm (Full frame type)
- Maximum resolution: 6016 x 4016 pixels (24 megapixels)
- Film speed: 100–12800, extended mode 50 to 51,200
- Recording medium: Two slots for SD, SDHC or SDXC memory cards (UHS-I compliant)

Focusing
- Focus modes: Instant single-servo (AF-S); continuous-servo (AF-C); auto AF-S/AF-C selection (AF-A); manual (M)
- Focus areas: 51 focus points

Exposure/metering
- Metering modes: Matrix metering, center-weighted metering, spot metering, highlight-weighted

Flash
- Flash exposure compensation: -3 to +1 EV in increments of 1/3 or 1/2 EV
- Flash synchronization: 1/200s max

Shutter
- Shutter: Electronically controlled vertical-travel focal-plane shutter
- Shutter speeds: 1/4000 s to 30 s and bulb
- Continuous shooting: 6.5 frames per second

Viewfinder
- Viewfinder magnification: 0.7
- Frame coverage: 100%

Image processing
- Image processor: Expeed 4
- White balance: Yes
- WB bracketing: 2 to 3 frames in steps of 1, 2 or 3

General
- LCD screen: 3.2 inches with 1,229,000 dots; tilting
- Battery: EN-EL15
- Dimensions: 141 x 113 x 78 mm (5.55 x 4.45 x 3.07 inches)
- Weight: 750 g (26 oz) camera body only (840 g with battery)
- Latest firmware: 1.15 / 21 February 2019; 7 years ago
- Made in: Thailand

Chronology
- Predecessor: Nikon D700
- Successor: Nikon D780

The Nikon D750 is a full-frame DSLR camera announced by Nikon on September 12, 2014. It is an extensive upgrade from the D610, but with the same general body and control characteristics, along with 24 megapixel resolution. Despite the 7, there is little relationship with the D700, which was the precursor to the D800. The D600 and D610 evolved as a full-frame consumer cameras with similar structure and controls to the D7000 series of cropped frame cameras. The D750 shares similar structure and controls with the cropped-frame D7200.

== Features ==
The D750 includes technologies from the D810 in a smaller and lighter body, but with better low light performance, for both focus and image quality at high ISO. Nikon sees the D750 with "advanced video features" for videographers as well as a primary or secondary camera for fast handling and speed. The camera can shoot at 6.5 frames per second at full resolution.

It has a newly developed 24.3-effective-megapixel image sensor (24.93 megapixel raw) with claimed lower image noise. The Expeed 4 processor from D4S/D810 and built-in Wi-Fi enable functions from the D810. Its autofocus is the same as in the D4S and D810, but can autofocus with less light than the D810, down to -3 EV.

The D750 has a tilting LCD screen (the first full-frame DSLR with an adjustable screen, although several Nikon DX bodies have tilting or fully articulated screens), and is cited as "the lightest among Nikon's traditional pro series". The body is a light-weight weather-sealed monocoque construction with carbon-fiber-reinforced polymer at the front and magnesium alloy for the back and top.

The D750 has been succeeded by the Nikon D780.

== Reception ==
DxOMark reviewed the D750 sensor image quality and assigned it an overall score of 93.

Since its release, the camera has been praised for its impressive low-light capabilities and effective autofocus.

Digital Photography Review completed their review of the D750 in December 2014 and assigned it a Gold Award as well as a 90% numerical rating.

== Nikon D750 vs D610 ==
The Nikon D750 shares similar specifications when it comes to size, ergonomics and resolution. However, there are bigger differences when it comes to performance.

- Image Processor: EXPEED-4 VS EXPEED-3
- Continuous Shooting Speed: 6.5 FPS VS 6 FPS
- ISO Sensitivity: 100–12,800 VS 100–6,400
- Auto Focus: 51 AF points, 15 cross-type VS 39 AF points, 9 cross-type
- Video Maximum Resolution: 1080p @ 60fps VS 1080p @ 30fps
- LCD: 3.2″ diagonal TFT-LCD Tilting VS 3.2″ diagonal TFT-LCD
- Battery Life: 1,230 shots VS 900 shots

== Issues ==
Some D750 bodies have been found to produce unwanted flare anomalies in certain shooting situations, namely when an intense light source is situated just above the frame of view. The problem is caused by a reflection of light within the internal components, and manifests in an irregular, discolored patch of light along the top of images. Nikon resolved to repair affected cameras at no cost.

Sensor	Class	1999	2000	2001	2002	2003	2004	2005	2006	2007	2008	2009	2010	2011	2012	2013	2014	2015	2016	2017	2018	2019	2020	2021	2022	2023	2024	2025	2026
FX (Full-frame)	Flagship											D3X ^{−P}																	
FX (Full-frame)	Flagship										D3 ^{−P}		D3S ^{−P}		D4		D4S		D5^{T}					D6^{T}					
FX (Full-frame)	Professional											D700 ^{−P}			D800/D800E			D810/D810A			D850 ^{AT}								
FX (Full-frame)	Enthusiast																Df												
FX (Full-frame)	Enthusiast																	D750 ^{A}					D780 ^{AT}						
FX (Full-frame)	Enthusiast															D600	D610												
DX (APS-C)	Flagship		D1^{−E}	D1X^{−E}				D2X^{−E}		D2Xs^{−E}																			
DX (APS-C)	Flagship		D1^{−E}	D1H ^{−E}			D2H^{−E}	D2Hs^{−E}																					
DX (APS-C)	Professional				D100^{−E}				D200^{−E}		D300^{−P}		D300S^{−P}						D500 ^{AT}										
DX (APS-C)	Enthusiast						D70^{−E}		D70s^{−E}	D80^{−E}		D90^{−E}		D7000 ^{−P}			D7100	D7200			D7500 ^{AT}								
DX (APS-C)	Upper-entry								D50^{−E}	D40X^{−E*}	D60^{−E*}		D5000^{A−P*}		D5100^{A−P*}	D5200^{A−P*}	D5300^{A*}	D5500^{AT*}		D5600 ^{AT*}									
DX (APS-C)	Entry-level									D40^{−E*}			D3000^{−E*}	D3100^{−P*}		D3200^{−P*}	D3300^{*}			D3400^{*}		D3500^{*}							
Early models		SVC (prototype; 1986); QV-1000C (1988); NASA F4 (1991); E2/E2S (1995); E2N/E2NS (1996); E3/E3S (1998)																											
Sensor	Class																												
Sensor	Class	1999	2000	2001	2002	2003	2004	2005	2006	2007	2008	2009	2010	2011	2012	2013	2014	2015	2016	2017	2018	2019	2020	2021	2022	2023	2024	2025	2026
