= Nikon D780 =

Overview
- Maker: Nikon
- Type: Digital single-lens reflex
- Released: January 6, 2020; 6 years ago

Lens
- Lens mount: Nikon F-mount

Sensor/medium
- Sensor type: BSI CMOS
- Sensor size: 35.9 x 23.9 mm (Nikon FX format)
- Sensor maker: Sony
- Maximum resolution: 6,048 x 4,024 pixels (24.3 megapixels)
- Film speed: 100–51,200, extended mode 50 to 204,800
- Recording medium: 2 × SD (UHS-II)

Focusing
- Focus modes: Instant single-servo (AF-S); continuous-servo (AF-C); auto AF-S/AF-C selection (AF-A); manual (M)
- Focus areas: 51 focus points

Exposure/metering
- Metering modes: Matrix metering, center-weighted metering, spot metering, highlight-weighted

Flash
- Flash exposure compensation: -3 to +1 EV in increments of 1/3 or 1/2 EV
- Flash synchronization: 1/200s max

Shutter
- Shutter: Electronically controlled vertical-travel focal-plane shutter
- Shutter speeds: 1/8,000 s to 30 s (extendable to 900 s in manual mode) and bulb
- Continuous shooting: 7 frames per second Live view: 8 frames per second (14-bit), 12 fps (12-bit)

Viewfinder
- Viewfinder magnification: 0.7
- Frame coverage: 100%

Image processing
- Image processor: EXPEED 6
- White balance: Yes

General
- Video recording: 4K up to 30 fps 1080p up to 120 fps
- LCD screen: 3.2 inches with 2,359,000 dots; tilting, touch enabled
- Battery: EN-EL15b
- AV port: HDMI Type C
- Data port: USB-C
- Dimensions: 143.5 x 115.5 x 76 mm (5.7 x 4.6 x 3 inches)
- Weight: 755 g (27 oz) (body only); 840 g (with battery & SD card)
- Latest firmware: 1.20 / 5 August 2025; 10 months ago
- Made in: Thailand

Chronology
- Predecessor: Nikon D750

The Nikon D780 is a full-frame DSLR camera announced by Nikon on January 6, 2020. It was released for purchase on January 23, 2020. It is the successor to the Nikon D750 and has incorporated many features from the mirrorless Z6 camera.

== Compared to the Nikon D750 ==
Nikon D780 logo

As compared to the previous Nikon D750, this camera body has an upgraded EXPEED 6 processor (the D750 had an EXPEED 4 processor), a BSI CMOS sensor that allows for better low-light performance (the D750 had an ISO range of 100–12,800, where the D780 has a range of 100–51,200), and a faster maximum shutter speed of 1/8000 (as compared to 1/4000 on the D750). For continuous shooting, the D780 can shoot up to 7 frames per second (fps), where the D750 was capable of shooting up to 6.5 fps. In "live view" mode, continuous shooting up to 12 fps is possible. While it does not have a built-in flash as the D750 does, nor an AF-assist lamp, it has a standard hot shoe for use with an external flash. With the switch to USB-C, the camera can recharge the EN-EL15b battery internally. The D780 also does not have the facility to add a battery grip with portrait orientation shooting controls.

== Memory card ==
The D780 has two SD card slots, supporting SD, SDHC (UHS-II compliant), and SDXC (UHS-II compliant).

== Gallery ==
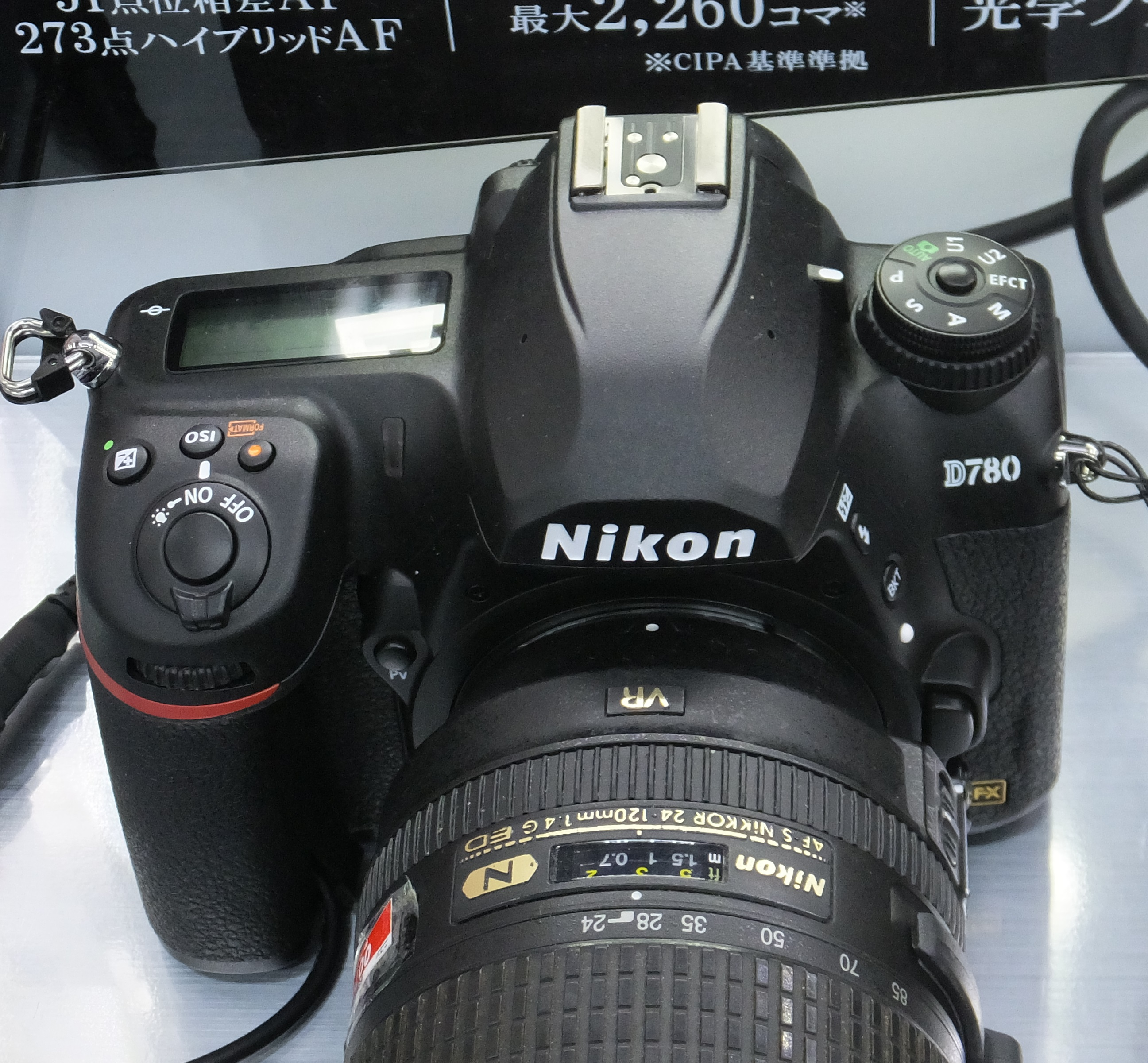

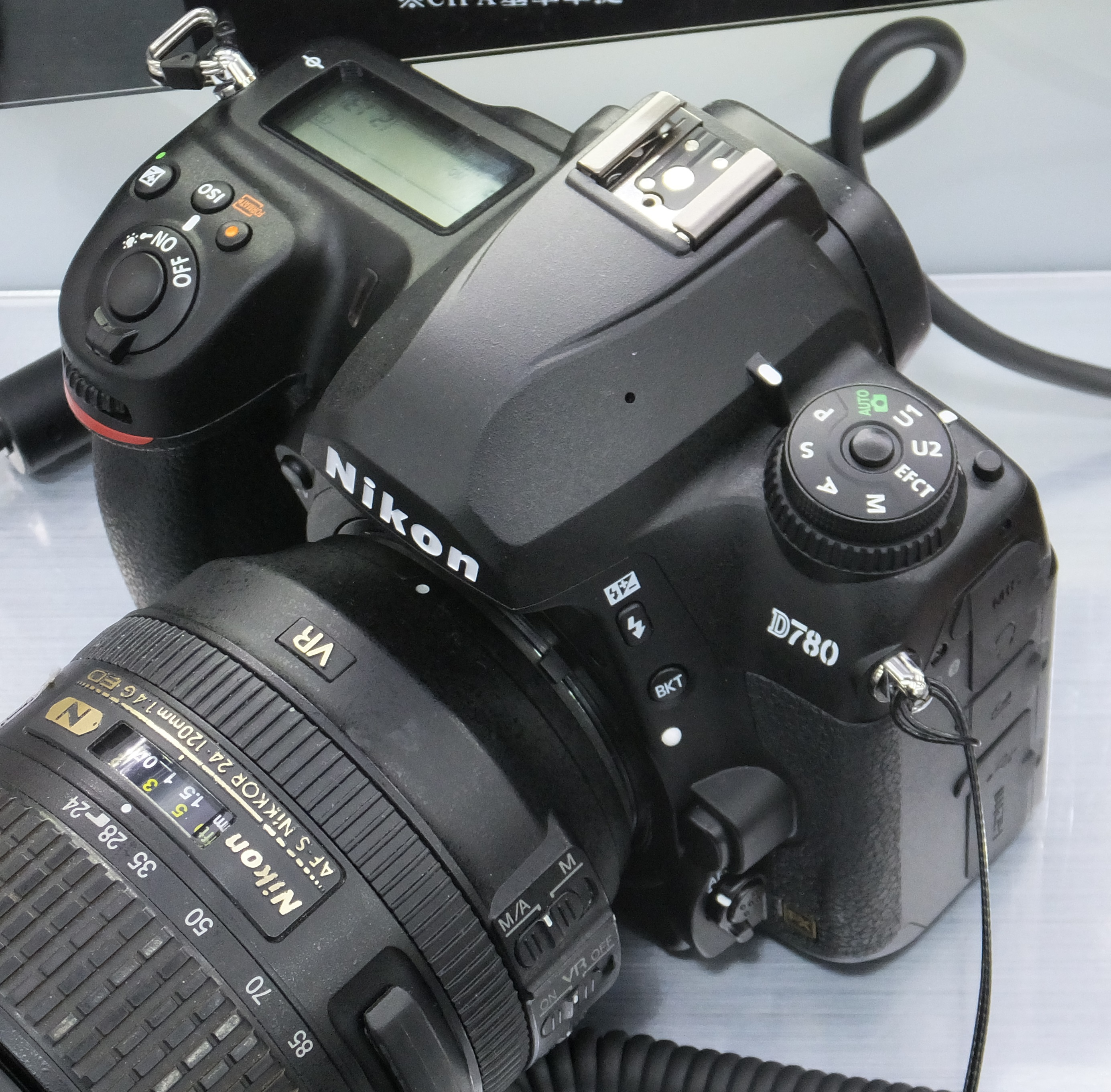

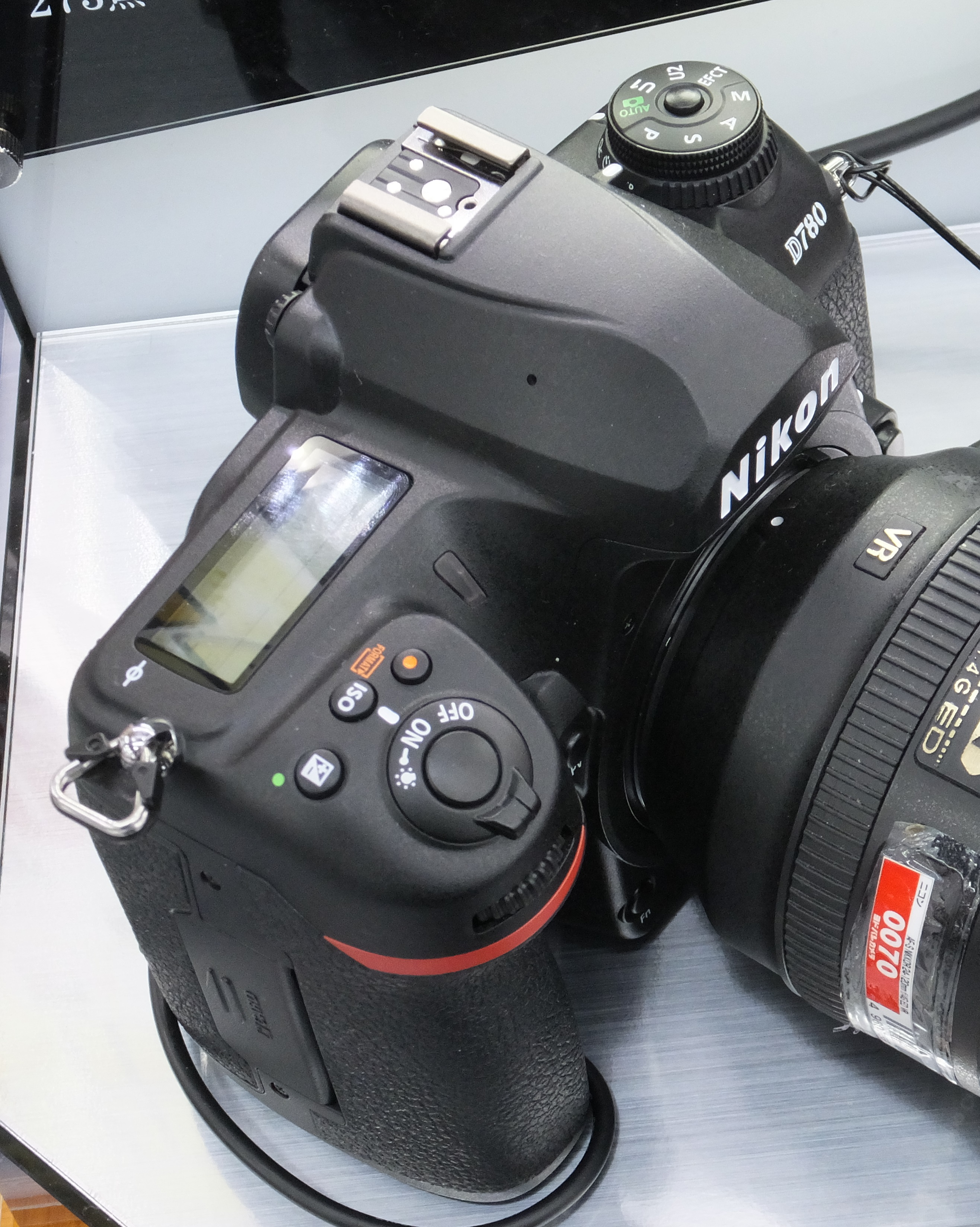

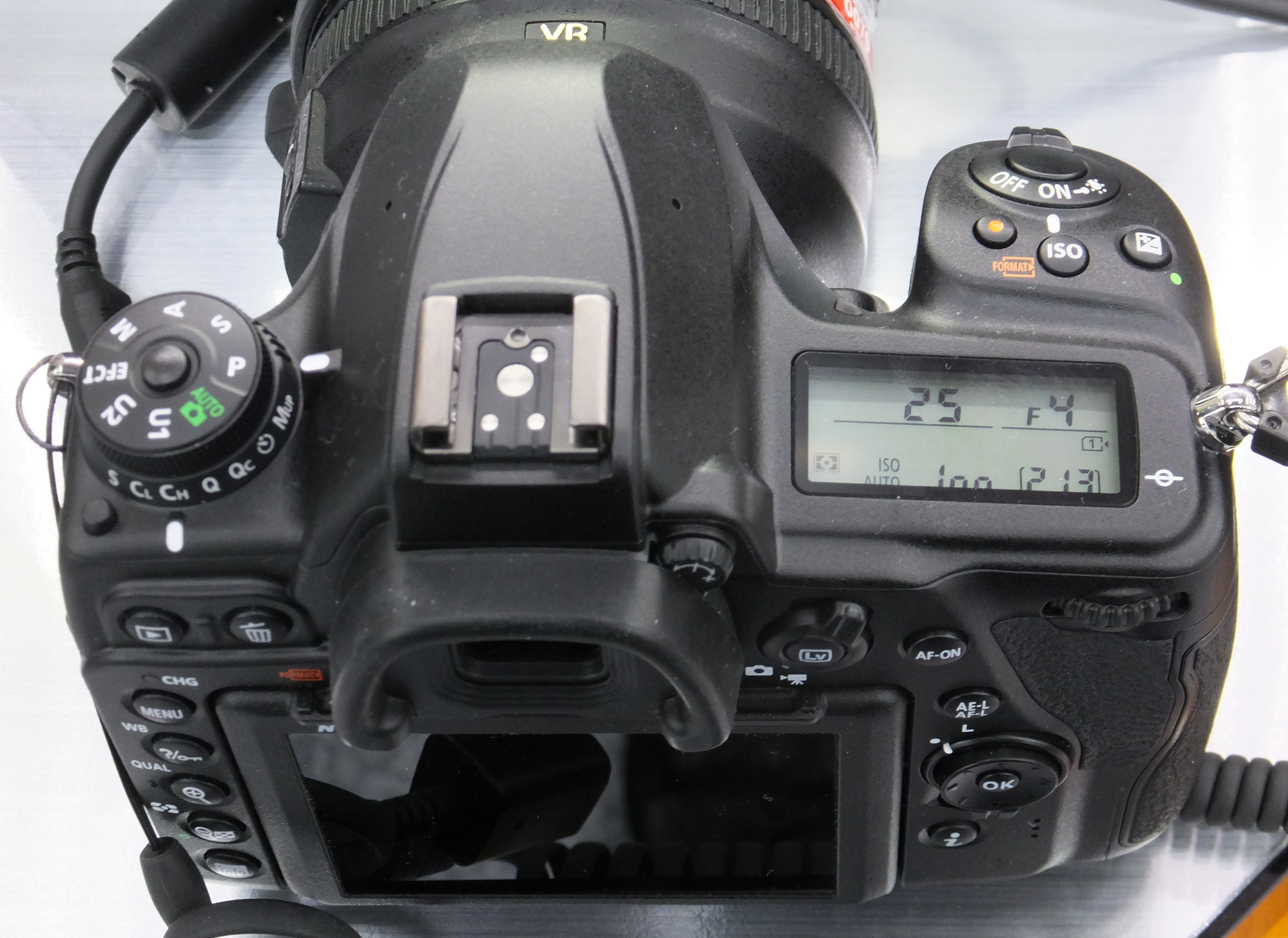

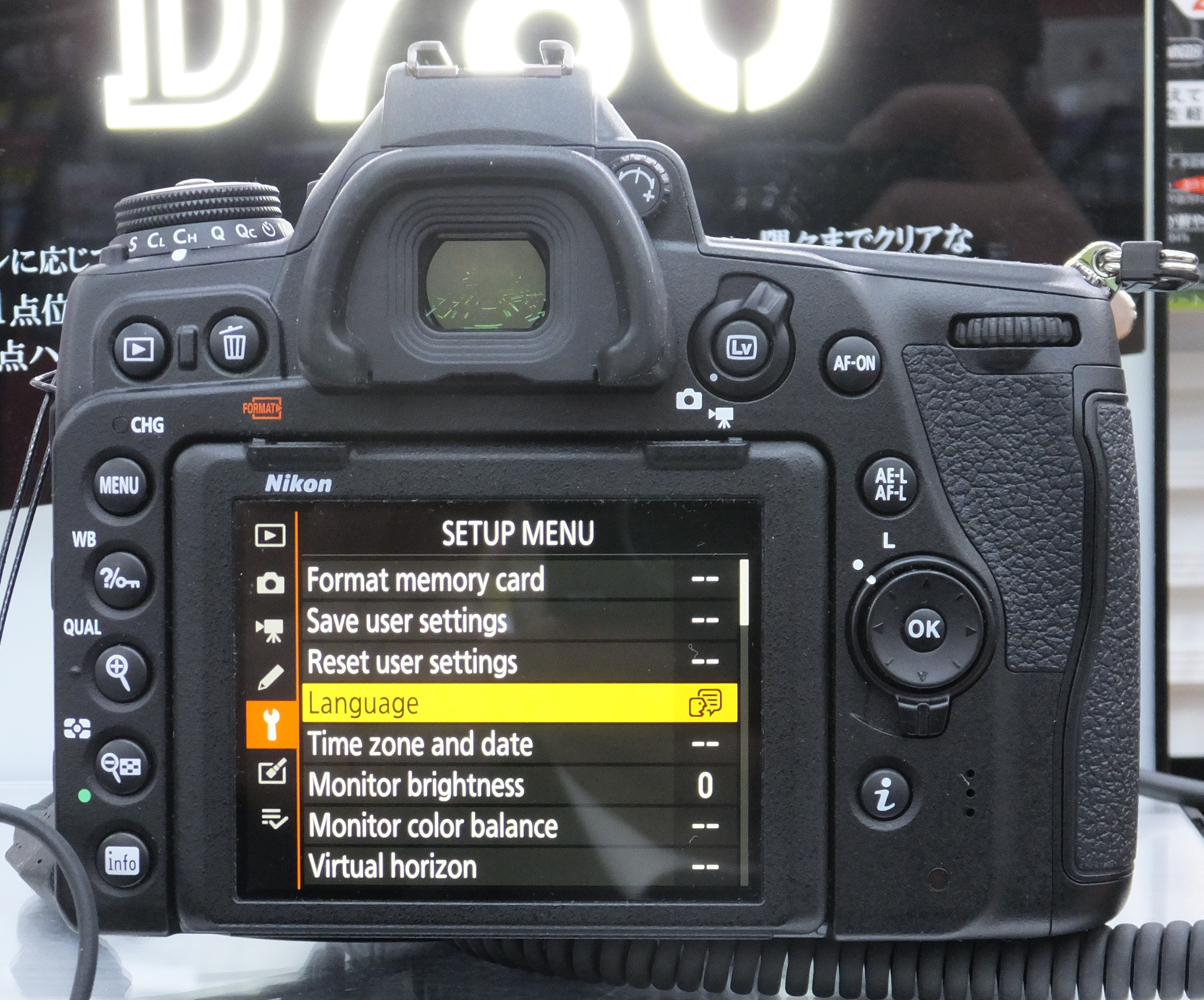

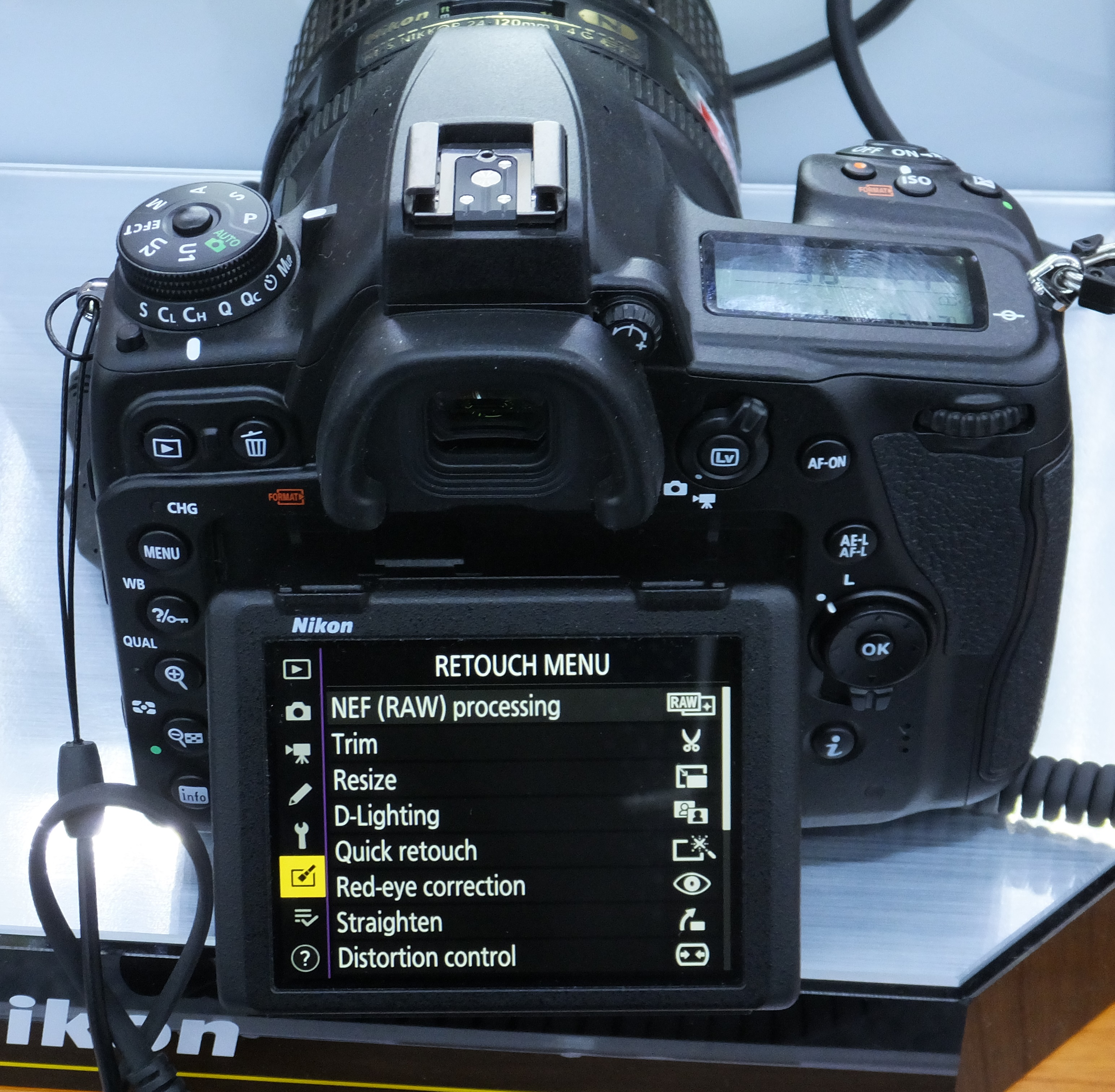

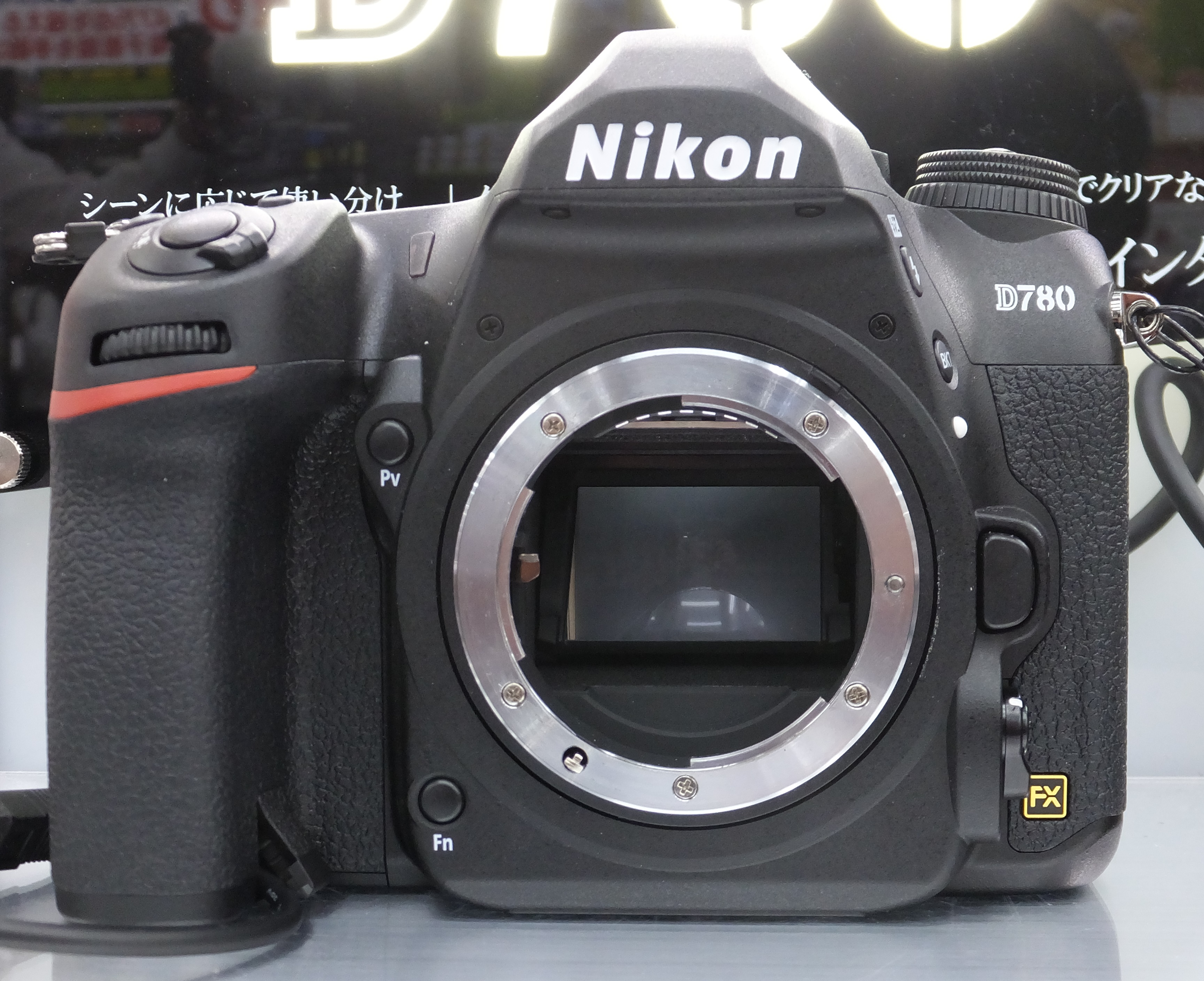

== Reception ==
DPReview calls the D780 "a DSLR that's learned a lot from mirrorless". They go on to note differences between the D750 and D780, finishing with the observation that those invested in Nikon F-mount lenses should consider this body if it meets their needs. Those not already invested in F-mount lenses should instead consider the Nikon Z6.

Sensor	Class	'99	'00	'01	'02	'03	'04	'05	'06	'07	'08	'09	'10	'11	'12	'13	'14	'15	'16	'17	'18	'19	'20	'21	'22	'23	'24	'25	'26
FX (Full-frame)	Flagship											D3X ^{−P}																	
FX (Full-frame)	Flagship										D3 ^{−P}		D3S ^{−P}		D4		D4S		D5^{T}					D6^{T}					
FX (Full-frame)	Professional											D700 ^{−P}			D800/D800E			D810/D810A			D850 ^{AT}								
FX (Full-frame)	Enthusiast																Df												
FX (Full-frame)	Enthusiast																	D750 ^{A}					D780 ^{AT}						
FX (Full-frame)	Enthusiast															D600	D610												
DX (APS-C)	Flagship		D1^{−E}	D1X^{−E}				D2X^{−E}		D2Xs^{−E}																			
DX (APS-C)	Flagship		D1^{−E}	D1H ^{−E}			D2H^{−E}	D2Hs^{−E}																					
DX (APS-C)	Professional				D100^{−E}				D200^{−E}		D300^{−P}		D300S^{−P}						D500 ^{AT}										
DX (APS-C)	Enthusiast						D70^{−E}		D70s^{−E}	D80^{−E}		D90^{−E}		D7000 ^{−P}			D7100	D7200			D7500 ^{AT}								
DX (APS-C)	Upper-entry								D50^{−E}	D40X^{−E*}	D60^{−E*}		D5000^{A−P*}		D5100^{A−P*}	D5200^{A−P*}	D5300^{A*}	D5500^{AT*}		D5600 ^{AT*}									
DX (APS-C)	Entry-level									D40^{−E*}			D3000^{−E*}	D3100^{−P*}		D3200^{−P*}	D3300^{*}			D3400^{*}		D3500^{*}							
Early models		SVC (prototype; 1986); QV-1000C (1988); NASA F4 (1991); E2/E2S (1995); E2N/E2NS (1996); E3/E3S (1998)																											
Sensor	Class																												
Sensor	Class	'99	'00	'01	'02	'03	'04	'05	'06	'07	'08	'09	'10	'11	'12	'13	'14	'15	'16	'17	'18	'19	'20	'21	'22	'23	'24	'25	'26
