= Pentax DA* 200mm lens =

Pentax smc DA* 200mm F2.8 ED (IF) SDM
- Maker: Pentax
- Lens mount(s): Pentax KAF

Technical data
- Type: Prime
- Focus drive: Ultrasonic
- Focal length: 200mm
- Aperture (max/min): f/2.8
- Close focus distance: 1.20 metres (3.9 ft)
- Max. magnification: 0.2
- Diaphragm blades: 9
- Construction: 9 elements in 8 groups

Features
- Manual focus override: Yes Yes
- Weather-sealing: Yes Yes
- Lens-based stabilization: No No
- Aperture ring: No No

Physical
- Max. length: 134 millimetres (5.3 in)
- Diameter: 83 millimetres (3.3 in)
- Weight: 825 grams (1.819 lb)
- Filter diameter: 77mm

Accessories
- Lens hood: PH-RBK77

History
- Introduction: 2008

The Pentax smc DA* 200mm F2.8 ED (IF) SDM is an interchangeable tele lens for Pentax K-mount, announced by Ricoh on January 23, 2008.
