= Pentax D FA 50mm lens =

smc Pentax-D FA 50mm f/2.8 Macro
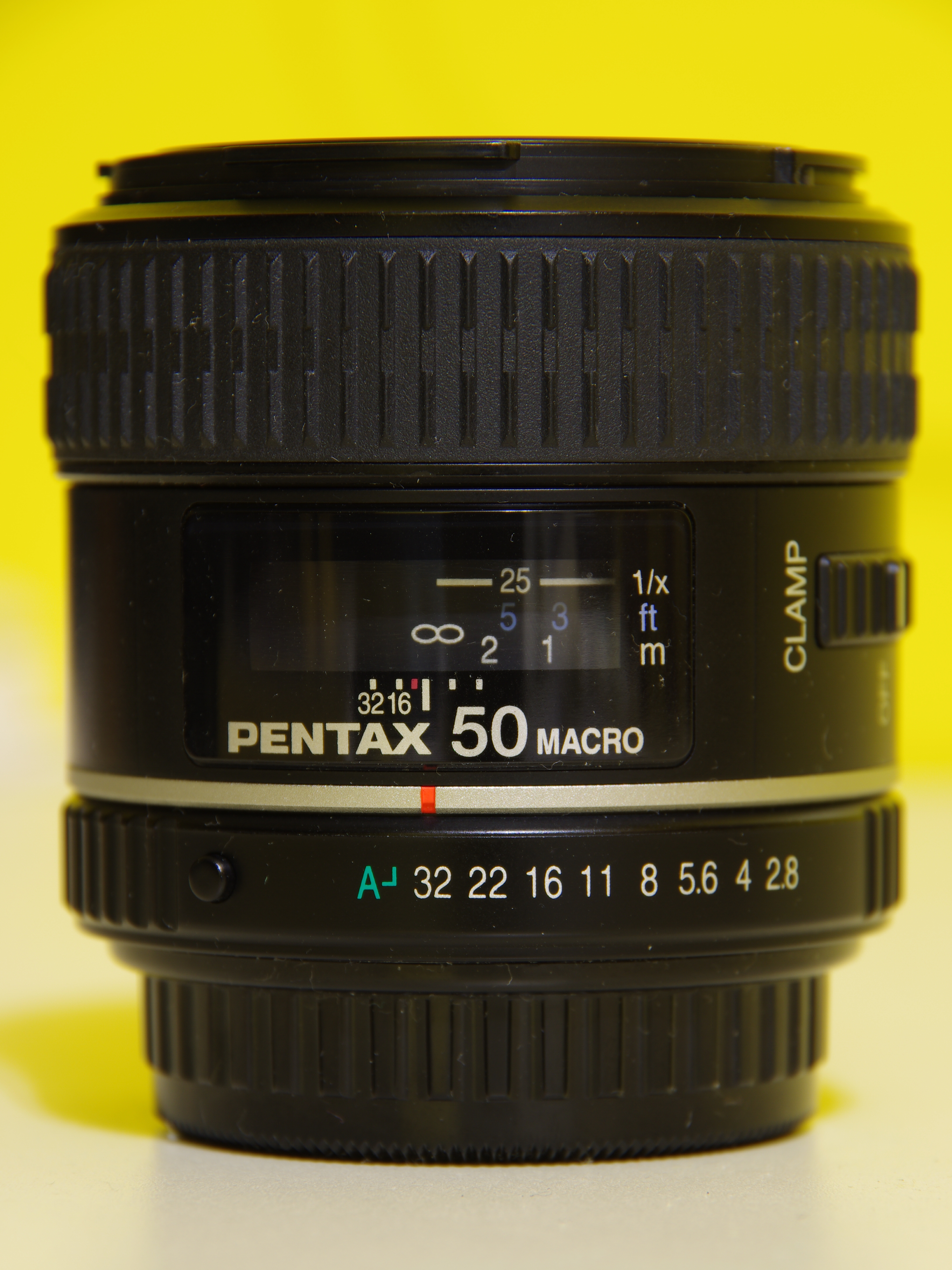
- Maker: Pentax

Technical data
- Type: Prime
- Focus drive: Screwdrive
- Focal length: 50mm
- Focal length (35mm equiv.): 75mm
- Crop factor: 1.0
- Aperture (max/min): f/2.8 / f/32
- Close focus distance: 20.0 millimetres (0.79 in)
- Max. magnification: 1.0x
- Diaphragm blades: 8
- Construction: 8 elements in 7 groups

Features
- Manual focus override: Yes Yes
- Macro capable: Yes Yes
- Application: Normal macro

Physical
- Max. length: 60.0 millimetres (2.36 in)
- Diameter: 67.5 millimetres (2.66 in)
- Weight: 265 grams (9.3 oz)
- Filter diameter: 49mm

Accessories
- Lens hood: PH-RBC 49mm
- Case: S80-80

Angle of view
- Diagonal: 47° (35mm film); 31.5° (APS-C)

History
- Introduction: 2004

Retail info
- MSRP: 599.95 USD

The smc Pentax-D FA 50mm f/2.8 Macro lens is a normal macro lens for the Pentax K-mount. While optimized for digital use, it offers full frame 135 film coverage. The lens is capable of reaching 1:1 magnification.
