= Ricoh XR-1 =

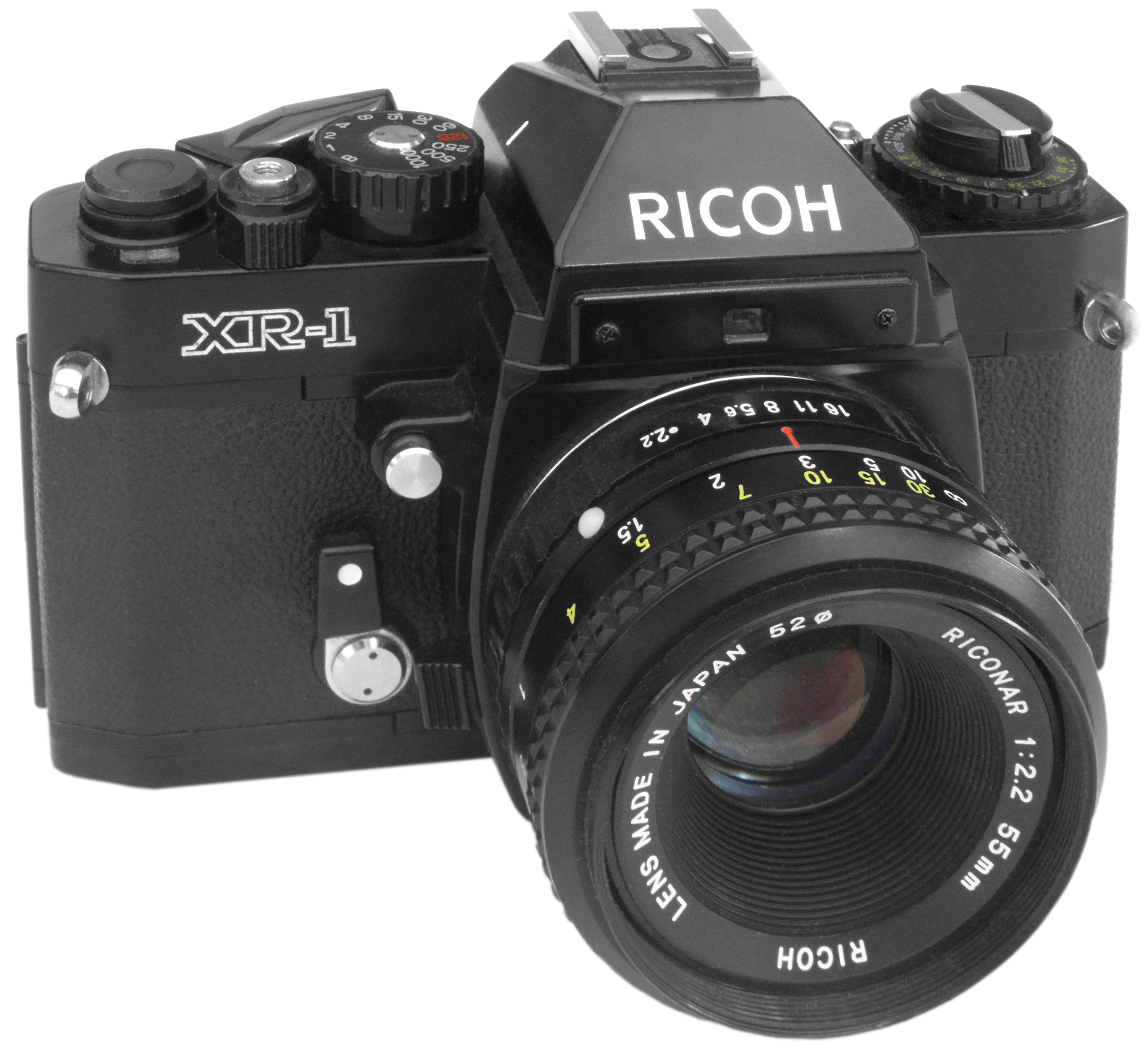

Overview
- Maker: Ricoh
- Type: Single-lens reflex
- Released: 1977

Lens
- Lens mount: Pentax K-mount
- Lens: Interchangeable

Sensor/medium
- Film format: 135 film
- Film speed: ISO 12 - 3200

Shutter
- Shutter speed range: 1s - 1/1000s

General
- Battery: 2x 1,5v silver oxide G13
- Dimensions: 139,9 mm x 91,3 mm x 48,0 mm
- Weight: 550 g (19 oz) (body only)

References
- https://www.flickr.com/photos/camerawiki/52776195784/in/pool-camerawiki/

The Ricoh XR-1 was the first k-mount SLR camera from Japanese camera producer Ricoh. It was introduced in 1977, and operated with 35mm film. The XR-1 was a completely manual camera, in comparison to the XR-2 which also included autoexposure. The XR-1 and XR-2 required 2x 1,5 G13 (aka LR44) silver oxide flat batteries to power built in CdS light meter.

The XR-1 is fitted with an x-synced hot shoe on top of the body, and an additional x-sync port on the left side of the body, to cater for time-era hand held separate flash with flash cord. The x-sync shutter speed is marked in red on the selector knob, 1/125 sec.

The XR-1 cost $139,95 with the standard XR Rikenon 50 mm f/2 lens when sold by New York Camera according to advertisement in Popular Photography January 1981.
