= Pentax DA 18-270mm lens =

smc Pentax DA 18-270mm F3.5-6.3 ED SDM
- Maker: Pentax
- Lens mount(s): Pentax KAF

Technical data
- Type: Zoom
- Focus drive: Ultrasonic
- Focal length: 18-270mm
- Focal length (35mm equiv.): 27.5-413mm
- Crop factor: 1.53
- Aperture (max/min): f/3.5-6.3 / f/22-45
- Close focus distance: 0.49 metres (1.6 ft)
- Max. magnification: 0.26
- Diaphragm blades: 7
- Construction: 16 elements in 13 groups

Features
- Weather-sealing: Yes Yes
- Lens-based stabilization: No No
- Application: Superzoom, travel zoom

Physical
- Diameter: 76 millimetres (3.0 in)
- Weight: 453 grams (0.999 lb)
- Filter diameter: 62mm

History
- Introduction: 2012

The smc Pentax DA 18-270mm F3.5-6.3 ED SDM is a superzoom lens manufactured by Pentax. It has been available since 2012.
