= Pentax DA 15mm Limited lens =

Pentax smc DA 15mm F4 ED AL Limited
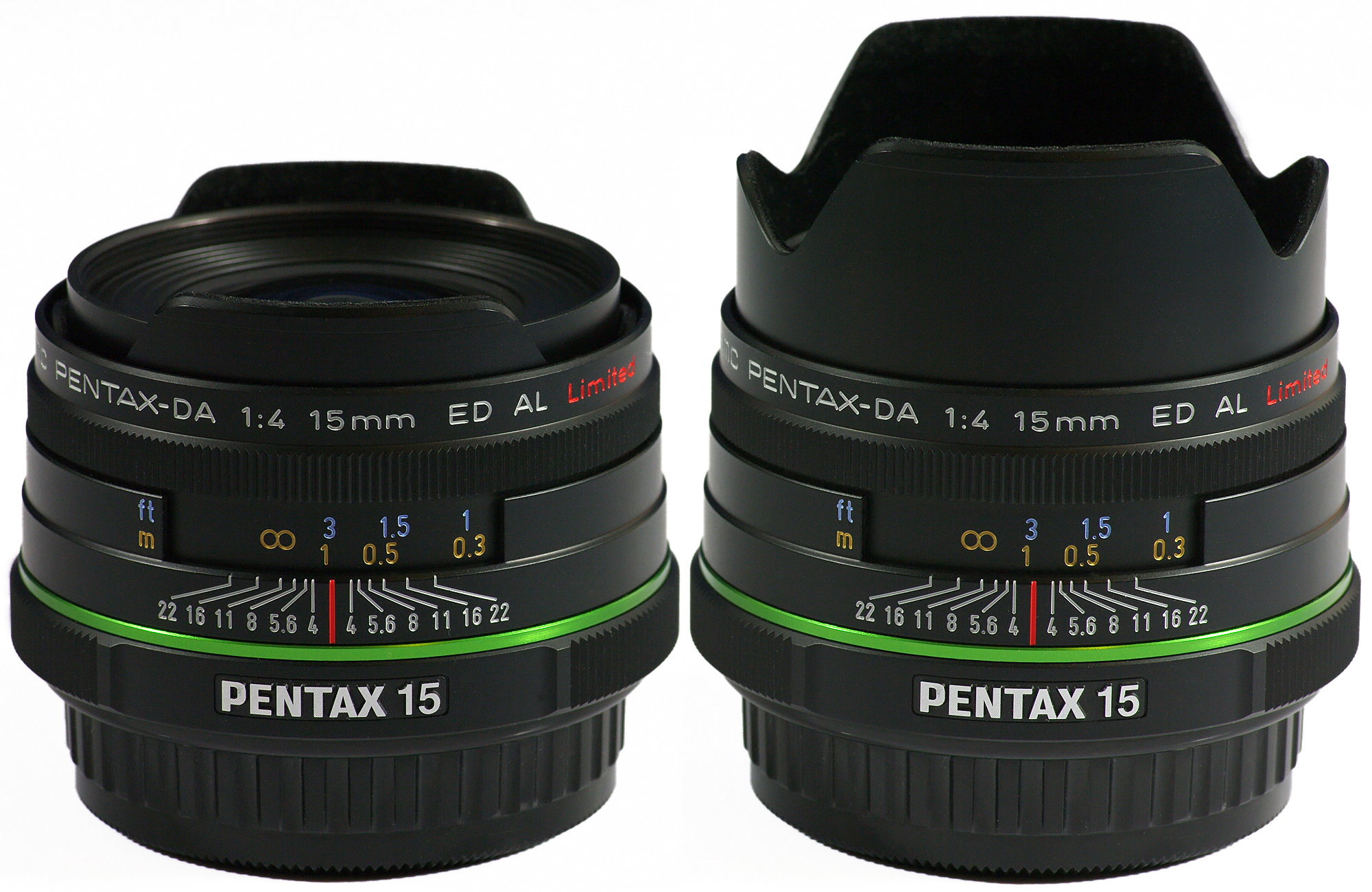
- Maker: Pentax
- Lens mount(s): Pentax K

Technical data
- Type: Prime
- Focus drive: Screwdrive
- Focal length: 15mm
- Focal length (35mm equiv.): 23mm
- Aperture (max/min): f/4.0
- Close focus distance: 0.18 metres (0.59 ft)
- Max. magnification: 0.15
- Diaphragm blades: 7
- Construction: 8 elements in 6 groups

Features
- Manual focus override: Yes Yes
- Weather-sealing: No No
- Lens-based stabilization: No No
- Aperture ring: No No

Physical
- Max. length: 40 millimetres (1.6 in)
- Diameter: 63 millimetres (2.5 in)
- Weight: 212 grams (0.467 lb)
- Filter diameter: 49mm

Accessories
- Lens hood: built in

History
- Introduction: 2009

The Pentax smc DA 15mm F4 ED AL Limited is a wide-angle prime lens for Pentax K-mount, announced by Pentax on March 2, 2009. Along with Pentax's other DA Limited primes, it was replaced in 2013 with an HD-coated version with rounded aperture blades.
