= Soligor =

German distributor of photography and video accessories

Soligor GmbH

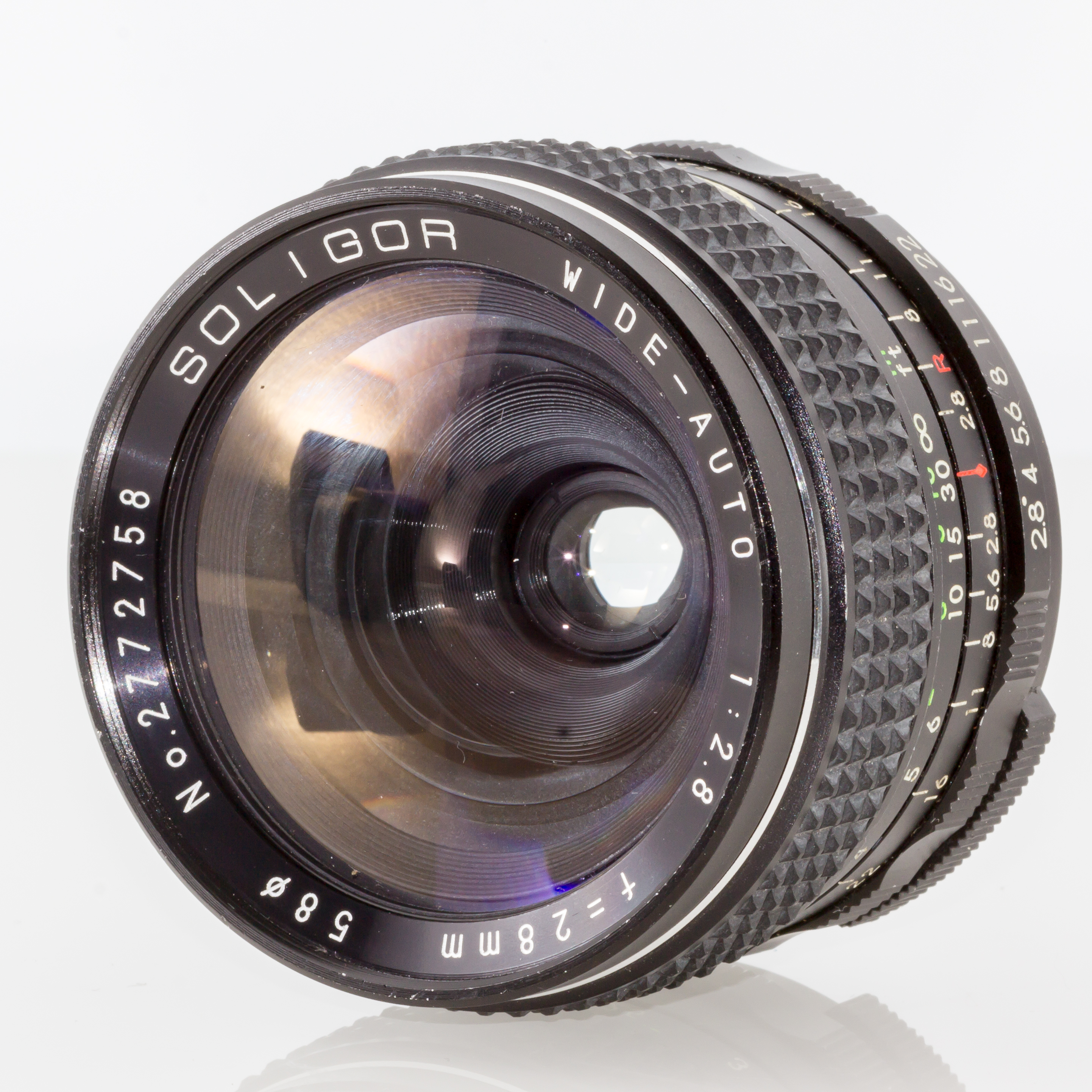
- Soligor brand camera lens
- Formerly: A.I.C. Phototechnik GmbH (until 1993)
- Founded: 1968; 58 years ago
- Headquarters: Leinfelden-Echterdingen, Baden-Württemberg, Germany
- Parent: Allied Impex Corporation (USA)

Soligor was originally the trade mark for the American Allied Impex Corporation, used from 1956 for lenses and later cameras imported from Japan. It imported cameras from Japan and also took control of companies in Japan. Among the first products was Miranda T camera and Soligor lenses.

Soligor GmbH is a German manufacturer of photographic equipment, optics, video surveillance equipment, and personal electronics. Founded in Stuttgart in 1968 as A.I.C. Phototechnik GmbH by Allied Impex Corporation (USA), the company changed its official name in 1993 to match the brand name used on its optical products.

Most commonly encountered products were manufactured in Japan (to quite a reasonable standard-many by Tokina) under the Soligor brand, as well as Miranda (which was acquired by Allied Impex in the 1960s). The company also seems to have had an association with Vivitar (the T4 interchangeable mount, for instance).

The company is currently located in Leinfelden-Echterdingen, just outside Stuttgart, in Baden-Württemberg.

== T4 interchangeable mount ==
Most famously associated with Soligor, designed in the 1960s (apparently by Tokina), the T4 mount was intended to compete with Tamron's T-thread, and the later Adapt-A-Matic mounts. The idea behind these mounts was 'one lens, any mount'. A retailer, for instance, only had to keep one lens model and a few, cheap mounts, rather than many lenses in every different lens mount. It allowed automatic aperture, aperture indexing/metering facilities.

Mounts were offered in almost all popular fittings. It was superseded by the TX system, sold by Vivitar (though the T4 mount was compatible with TX lenses.) Vivitar as a brand name was owned by Ponder & Best at this time (T4 for Two).

- T4 interchangeable mounts were produced for:
  - Canon FL (same as FD)
  - Exakta
  - Icarex BM
  - Leicaflex
  - Minolta SR (Uses MC and MD line of lenses)
  - Miranda bayonet (Model F, G, & Sensomat)
  - Miranda Sensorex (with meter coupling arm)
  - Nikon F (non-AI)
  - Pentax/Praktica universal screw (M42)
  - Petri
  - Topcon RE
