= Pentax DA 12-24mm lens =

smc PENTAX DA 12-24mm F4.0 ED AL (IF)
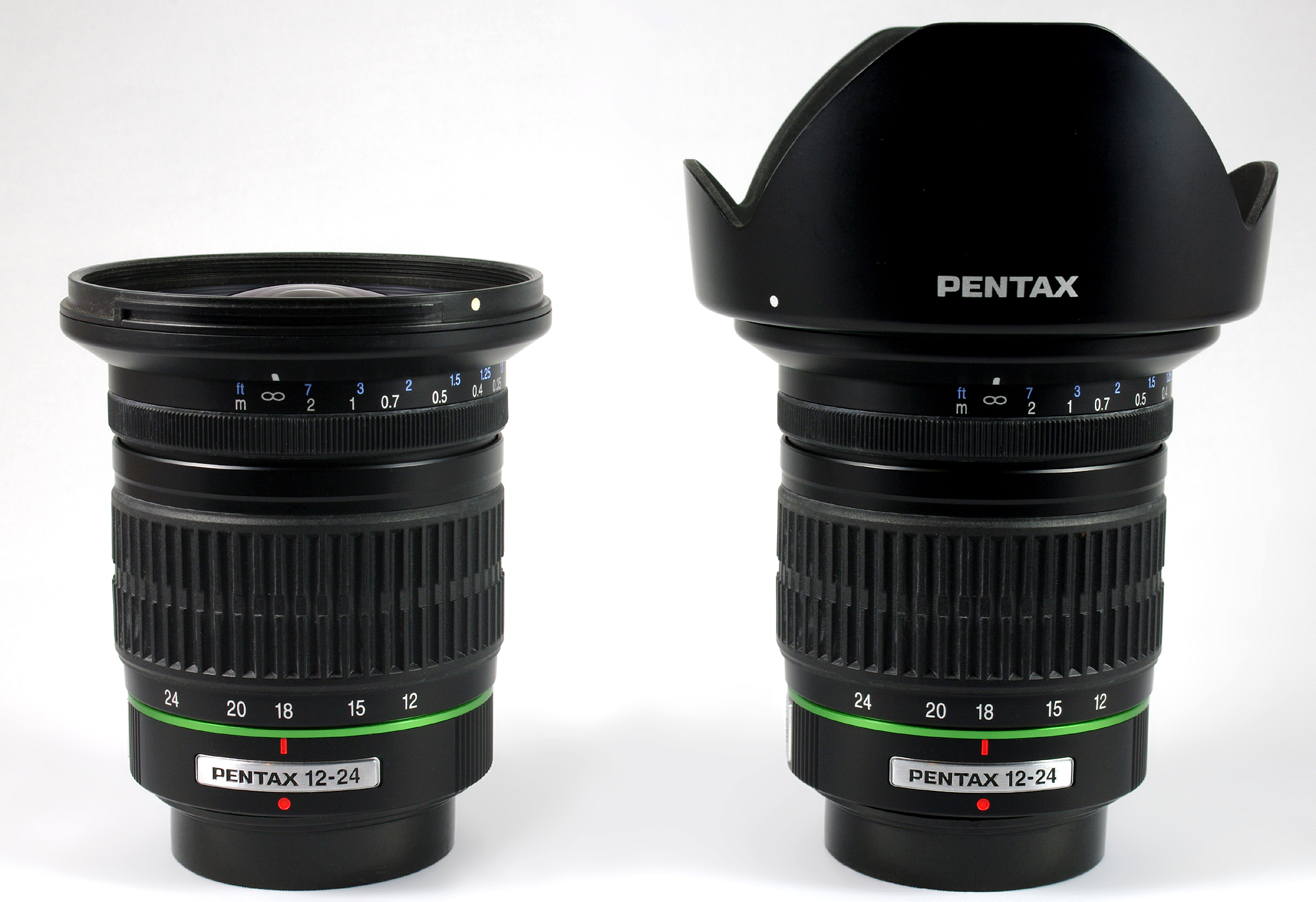
- Maker: Pentax

Technical data
- Type: Zoom
- Focus drive: Screwdrive
- Focal length: 12-24mm
- Focal length (35mm equiv.): 18-36mm
- Aperture (max/min): Constant f/4 wide open, f/22 at narrowest
- Close focus distance: 12 inches (30 cm)
- Max. magnification: 0.12
- Diaphragm blades: 8
- Construction: 13 elements in 11 groups

Features
- Manual focus override: Yes Yes
- Application: Architecture, interiors, landscape, large groups

Physical
- Diameter: 88 millimetres (3.5 in)
- Weight: 15.2 oz (430 g)
- Filter diameter: 77mm

Accessories
- Lens hood: PH-RBI 77MM
- Case: Lens Soft Case S80-120

Retail info
- MSRP: 899.95 USD

The smc PENTAX DA 12-24mm F4.0 ED AL (IF) is a wide angle zoom lens by Pentax for K mount.
