= Zenitar =

Series of camera lenses

Zenitar (Russian: Зенитар) is a series of Soviet/Russian prime lenses. They were developed and are currently produced by JSC S. A. Zverev Krasnogorskiy Mekhanicheskiy Zavod (KMZ). The series is most commonly known for the 1:2.8 16 mm fisheye lens.

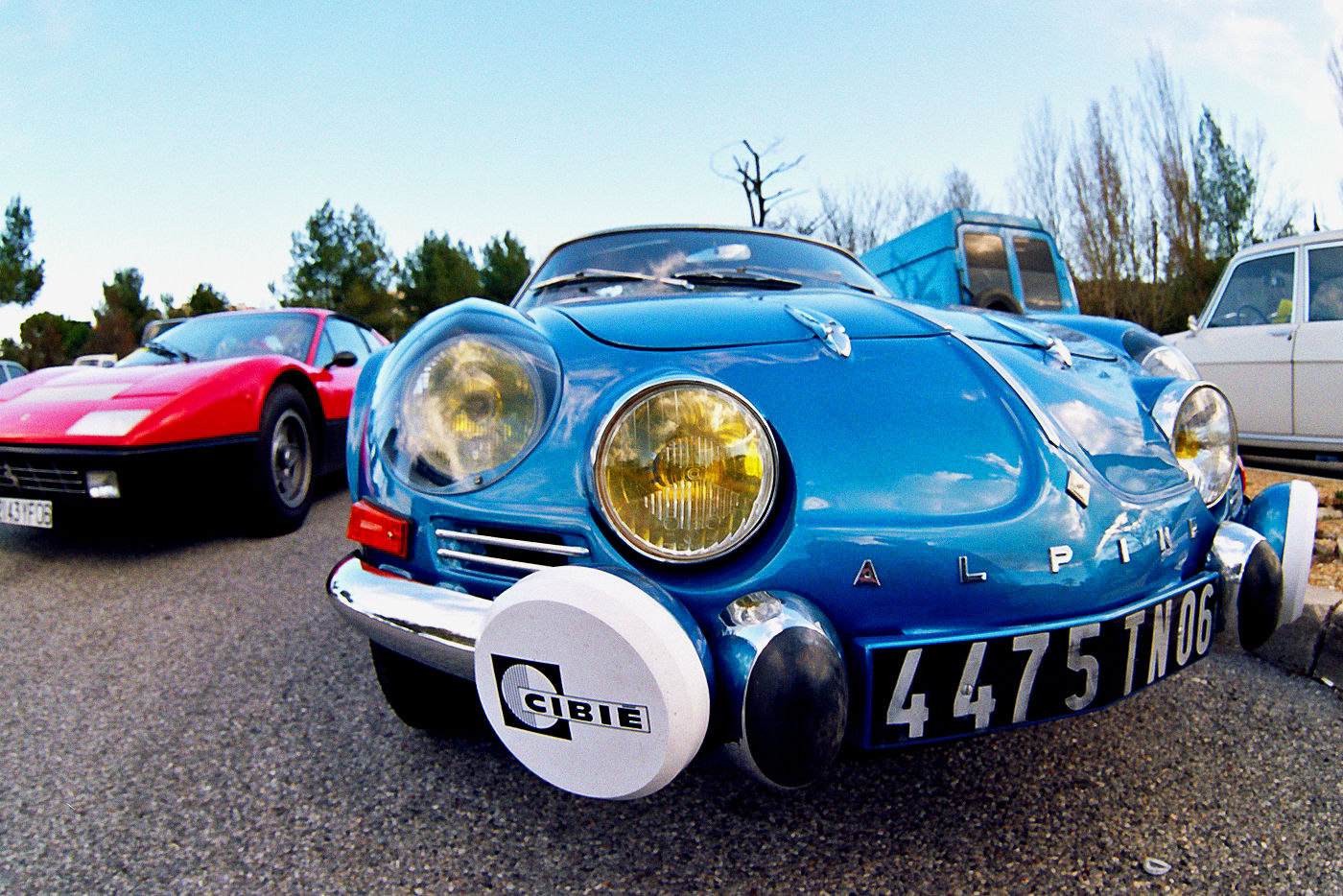
Example photo made using MC Zenitar 16mm f/2.8 fisheye lens

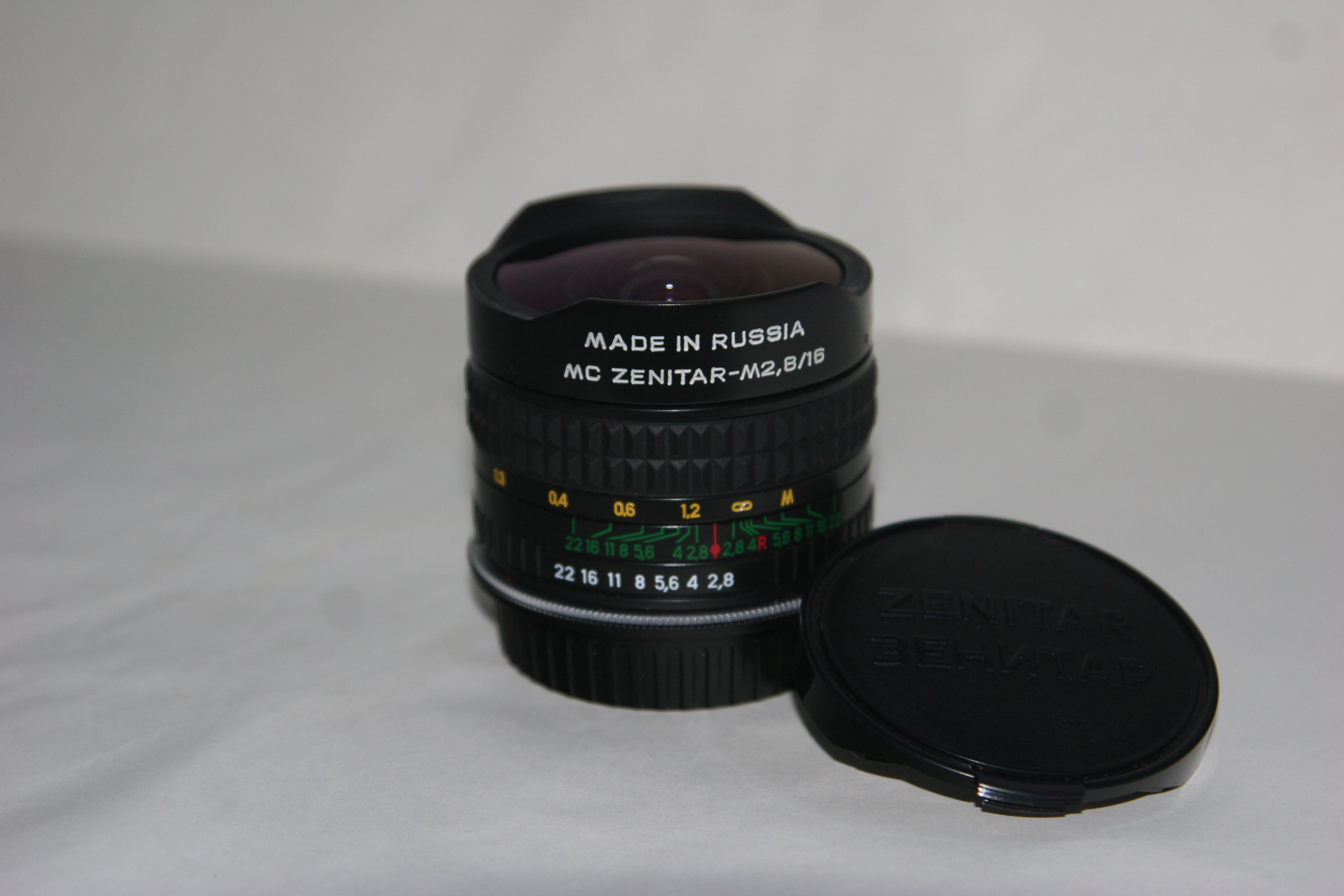
MC Zenitar-M2,8/16

The lenses can be used with cameras using the M42 lens mount as well as with other mount systems using an adaptor ring. They can also be equipped with a Pentax K mount since the flange-film distance is identical.

- MC Zenitar-K/M/N 1:2.8 16 mm full-frame fisheye
- MC Zenitar-K/M 1:2.8 20 mm
- MC Zenitar-K 1:2.8 28 mm
- MC Zenitar-К 1:1.4 50 mm
- MC Zenitar-ME1 1:1.7/50 mm
- MC Zenitar-K/M 1:1.9 50 mm
- MC Zenitar-К/M 1:2.0 50 mm
- MC Zenitar-1K 1:1.4 85 mm
- MC APO Telezenitar-M/K 1:2.8 135 mm telephoto
- MC APO Telezenitar-K/M 1:4.5 300 mm telephoto
- MC Variozenitar-K/M 1:2:8-3.5 25-45 mm zoom
- MC Variozenitar 1:3.2-4.5 35-70 mm zoom
- MC Variozenitar-K 1:3.5-4.5 35-105 mm zoom
- MC Variozenitar-K 1:4.0 70-210 mm zoom
