= Miranda T =

Camera model

Orion Miranda T c.1955
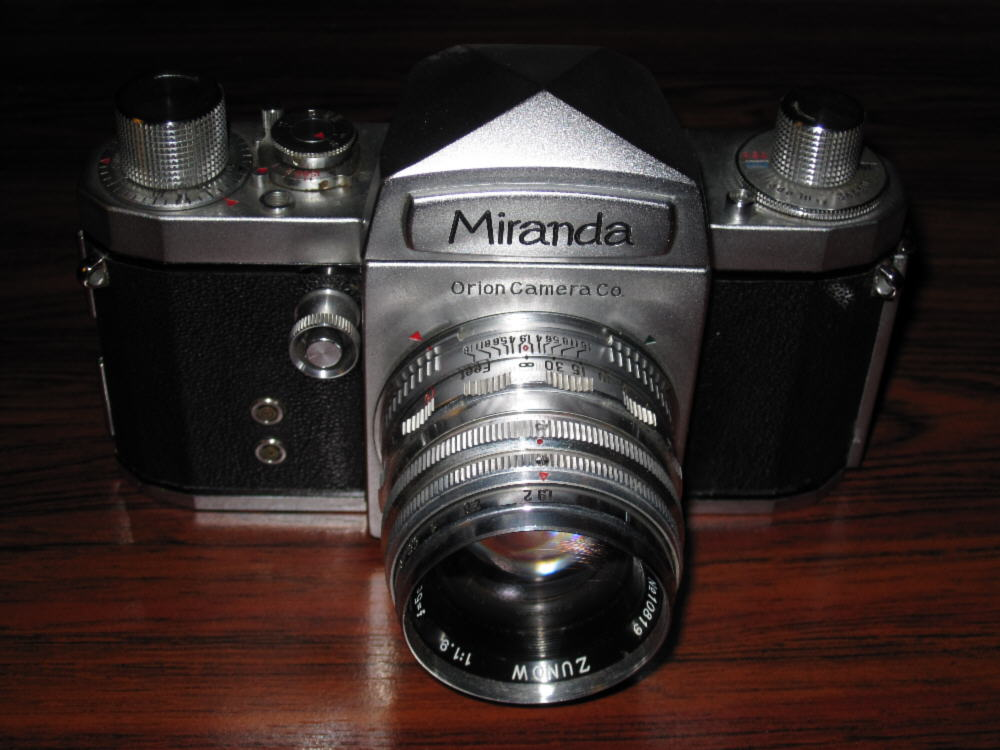

Overview
- Type: 35 mm camera

Lens
- Lens mount: Miranda 44mm

Focusing
- Focus: Zunow lens, helical

Exposure/metering
- Exposure: 24 × 36 mm on 35 mm film

The original Miranda T 35 mm SLR camera was launched by the newly established Japanese Orion Camera Co. in 1955. It is the first Japanese 35mm SLR camera to have an eyelevel Pentaprism finder. The camera was a success, and after only two years, the manufacturer changed its name to the Miranda Camera Co.. The camera stayed in production for two more years while a series of new models designated model A, B, C, D, and S were introduced, based on the original camera. These comprised improvements like a faster shutter with 1/1000-second top speed, a frame counter, wind-on lever, and an Instant return mirror on model B in 1958. In addition, a rare Miranda TII with 1/1000-second top shutter speed does exist.

The Miranda cameras were equipped with a double lensmount consisting of a wide 44 mm internal thread and an external bayonet—the Pentax/Praktica screw mount is 42 mm. The flange to film plane distance was deliberately made as short as possible to accommodate as many different makes of camera lenses as possible using separately sold lens adapters. The detachable finder prism was set in a sliding mount. The lenses for the Miranda were at first supplied by either Zunow or Ofunar. However, by the end of the 1950s, Soligor became the main supplier, and soon the lenses were labelled Auto Miranda.

== See also ==
- History of the single-lens reflex camera
- List of camera types
