= Pentax K-3 II =

Digital camera model

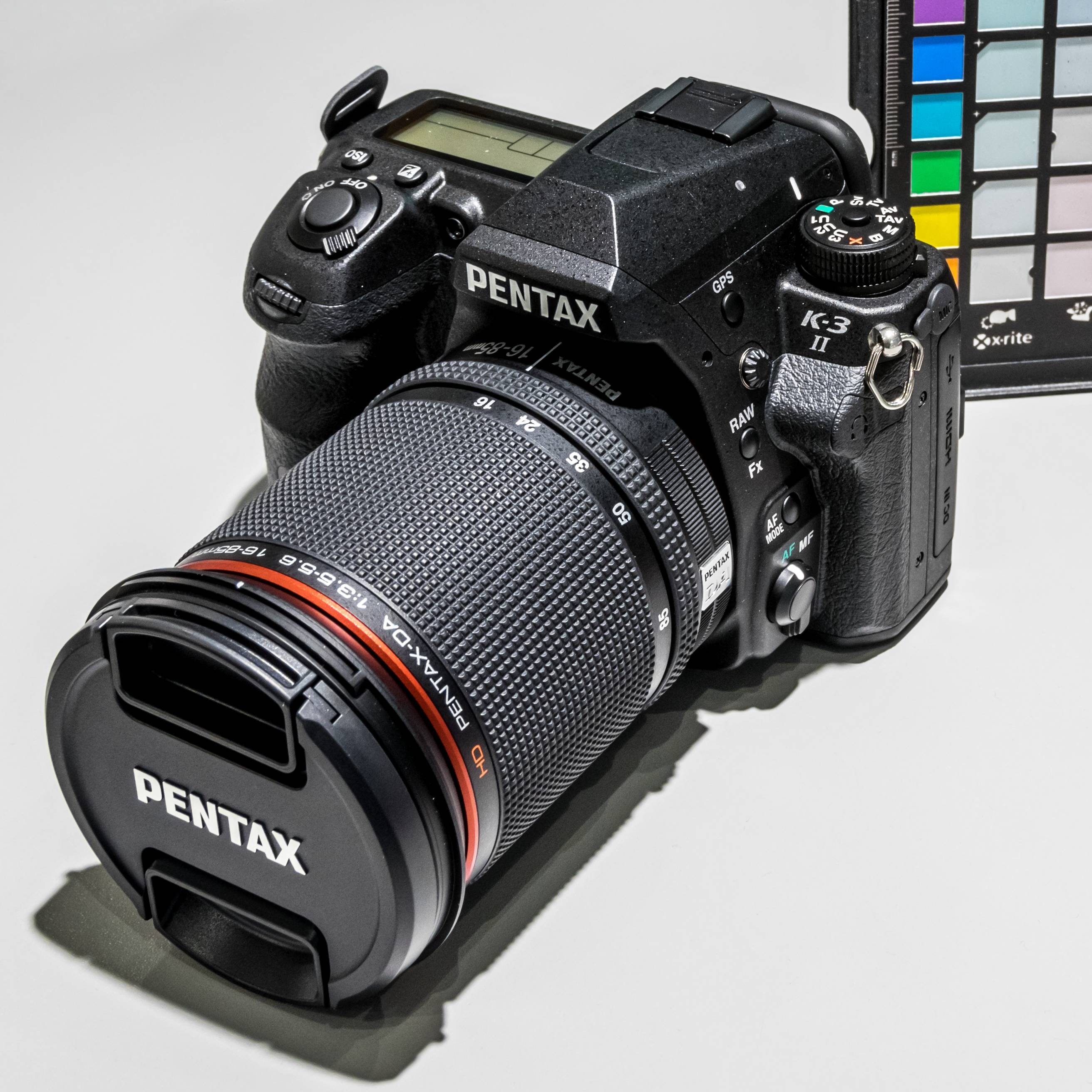

Overview
- Maker: Ricoh Imaging
- Type: Digital single-lens reflex camera
- Production: 2015-2018
- Intro price: $999

Lens
- Lens mount: Pentax KAF2
- Lens: Interchangeable lens

Sensor/medium
- Sensor type: CMOS
- Sensor size: 23.5 x 15.6mm (APS-C type)
- Sensor maker: Sony
- Maximum resolution: 6016 x 4000 (24 megapixels)
- Film speed: ISO 100-51200
- Recording medium: Dual UHS-1 SD, SDHC or SDXC card slots

Focusing
- Focus modes: Single AF (AF.S), Continuous AF (AF.C), Auto select AF (AF.A)
- Focus areas: 27 focus points (25 cross-type)

Exposure/metering
- Exposure bracketing: Yes (5 stops)
- Exposure modes: Green (Auto), Manual (M), Aperture Priority (Av), Shutter Priority (Tv), Shutter and Aperture Priority (TAv), Sensitivity Priority (Sv), Flexible Program (P), Bulb (B), Flash Sync (X), 3 User Modes
- Exposure metering: TTL open aperture metering using 86K pixel RGB sensor
- Metering modes: Multi-segment, Center-weighted and Spot metering

Flash
- Flash: External only: 1/180 X-sync speed, hot shoe for P-TTL flash units with high-speed sync support, X-sync socket
- Flash exposure compensation: Yes

Shutter
- Shutter: Electronically controlled vertical-run focal plane shutter (Electronic shutter when using Pixel Shift Resolution)
- Shutter speeds: 1/8000s to 30s
- Continuous shooting: up to 8.3 fps for 60 JPG or 23 RAW images

Viewfinder
- Viewfinder: Eye-level pentaprism
- Viewfinder magnification: 0.95
- Frame coverage: 100%

Image processing
- Image processor: Prime III
- White balance: Yes
- Dynamic range compressor: Yes

General
- Video recording: 1920x1080 (60i/50i/30p/25p/24p） 1280x720 (60p/50p/30p/25p/24p)
- LCD screen: 3.2 inches with 1,037,000 dots (0.35 Mpixels)
- Battery: D-Li90 (1860 mAh 7.2 V, 13.39 Wh)
- Optional battery packs: D-BG5
- Data port(s): USB 3.0 microB, HDMI (Type D), external power supply, external cable switch, X-sync socket, Stereo microphone input, Headphone output
- Body features: integrated GPS-Antenna, magnesium alloy, 92 sealing parts (dustproof, weather-resistant and -10°C cold-resistant construction)
- Dimensions: 131 x 100 x 77mm (5.16 x 3.94 x 3.03 inches)
- Weight: 700 g (25 oz) (body only); 785g (including battery and 1x SD Memory Card)
- Made in: Philippines

Chronology
- Predecessor: Pentax K-3
- Successor: Pentax K-3 Mark III

References
- http://news.ricoh-imaging.co.jp/rim_info2/2015/20150423_007349.html

The Pentax K-3 II was a flagship APS-C DSLR camera announced by Ricoh on April 23, 2015.

It is differentiated from its predecessor by inclusion of a GPS module with AstroTracer functionality (automatic tracking of the passage of stars across the sky, i.e. compensation of the rotation of the Earth; allows sharper, more detailed (less noisy) astrophotographs from longer exposures) and by "Pixel Shift Resolution", a capture mode giving higher spatial resolution. The integrated GPS module can also record positions of the camera while not in use, which allows subsequently reconstructing the path taken by the photographer. The GPS module occupies the space formerly given to the onboard flash, which has been omitted.

Pixel Shift Resolution records four separate images in quick succession and combines them into a final image. The higher spatial resolution results from the fact that the sensor is shifted by one pixel between each pair of sequential exposures, such that all four colour filters in the Bayer pattern are applied once for each pixel (two green, one red, one blue). Therefore, the full colour spectrum is available for each pixel, giving more accurate (non-interpolated) colour and higher resolution. Pixel Shift images can be saved as JPEG or RAW, as can normal images. A Pixel Shift RAW file contains embedded in it the original four captures in RAW format. This capture mode is best used for static subjects, as approximately 1.3 seconds pass between the first and last exposure. This also dictates use of a tripod or other stabilisation for the camera.

Of further note is the image stabilisation system, which according to CIPA standard has been improved from 3.5 stops in the original K-3 to 4.5 stops. The manufacturer further states that autofocus has been improved.

Type	Sensor	Class	2003	2004	2005	2006		2007	2008	2009	2010	2011	2012	2013	2014	2015	2016	2017	2018	2019	2020	2021	2022	2023	2024	2025
DSLR	MF	Professional										645D				645Z										
DSLR	FF	Professional																K-1		K-1 II						
DSLR	APS-C	High-end															K-3 II						K-3 III			
DSLR	APS-C	High-end													K-3											
DSLR	APS-C	Advanced									K-7	K-5		K-5 II / K-5 IIs												
DSLR	APS-C	Advanced		*ist D			K10D		K20D									KP								
DSLR	APS-C	Midrange					K100D	100DS	K200D					K-30	K-50			K-70						KF		
DSLR	APS-C	Entry-level			*ist DS	*ist DS2						K-r			K-500	K-S2										
DSLR	APS-C	Entry-level			*ist DL	DL2	K110D			K-m/K2000	K-x					K-S1										
MILC	APS-C	K-mount											K-01													
MILC	1/1.7"	Q-mount													Q7											
MILC	1/1.7"	Q-mount														Q-S1										
MILC	1/2.3"	Q-mount											Q	Q10												
DSLR	Prototypes		MZ-D (2000); 645D Prototype (2006); AP 50th Anniv. (2007)																							
Type	Sensor	Class																								
Type	Sensor	Class	2003	2004	2005	2006		2007	2008	2009	2010	2011	2012	2013	2014	2015	2016	2017	2018	2019	2020	2021	2022	2023	2024	2025
