= Pentax K-mount =

Series of camera lens mounts made by Pentax

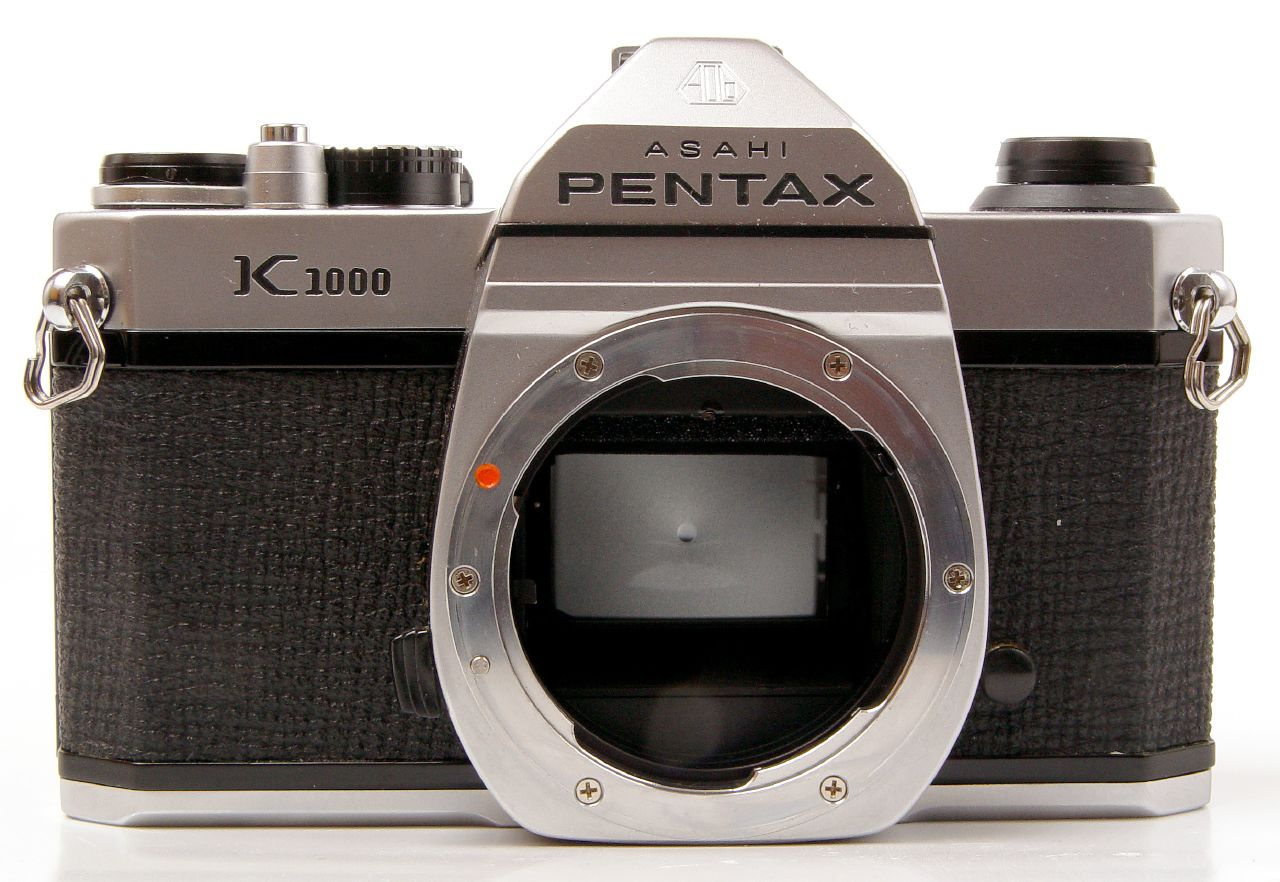
- Pentax K1000 without lens, showing the original K mount
- Type: bayonet
- Tabs: 3
- Connectors: electrical pins, drive shaft for focus.

The Pentax K-mount, sometimes referred to as the “PK-mount", is a bayonet lens mount standard for mounting interchangeable photographic lenses to 35 mm single-lens reflex (SLR) cameras. It was created by Pentax in 1975, and has since been used by all Pentax 35 mm and digital SLRs and also the MILC Pentax K-01. A number of other manufacturers have also produced many K-mount lenses and K-mount cameras.

== Mounts ==
The Pentax K-mount has undergone a number of evolutions over the years as new functionality has been added. In general, the term K-mount may refer to the original K-mount, or to all its variations.

Originally designed by Zeiss for an alliance with Pentax, it was intended to be a common lens mount for a proposed series of cameras and lenses. However, the plan failed to work out and the two firms parted company amicably, but Pentax retained the lens mount and at least one Zeiss lens design for its own use.

=== K-mount ===
The original K-mount is a simple bayonet connection with three tabs. It was introduced with the K series of cameras. The lens is locked into the camera with an approx. 70° clockwise turn (when looking at the front of the camera).

The only linkage with the camera is mechanical and involves the aperture. A slot between two of the bayonet tabs on the lens allows the stop-down coupler from the camera to sense the aperture setting on the lens and adjust the light meter display accordingly. Opposite this is the diaphragm release from the lens which extends into the camera body and holds open the spring-loaded diaphragm of the lens. When setting up a shot this keeps the diaphragm fully open. When the shutter is released, so is this lever. It allows the diaphragm to close to the desired setting while the film is being exposed, and opens it again after the shutter closes.

Both of these linkages are arranged so that they are aligned and spring-loaded by the act of inserting the lens and turning it until it locks.

Bodies equipped with the original K-mount include the K series, the M series except the ME F, and the LX. Lenses that support it include those labelled 'SMC Pentax', 'SMC Pentax-M' and 'SMC Pentax-A'. These K-mount bodies cannot use lenses that lack an aperture ring, such as FAJ or DA.

K-mount lenses can be used on all Pentax bodies, but are restricted to stopped down mode when used with “modified" K_{AF}-mount bodies (see below).

=== K_{F}-mount ===
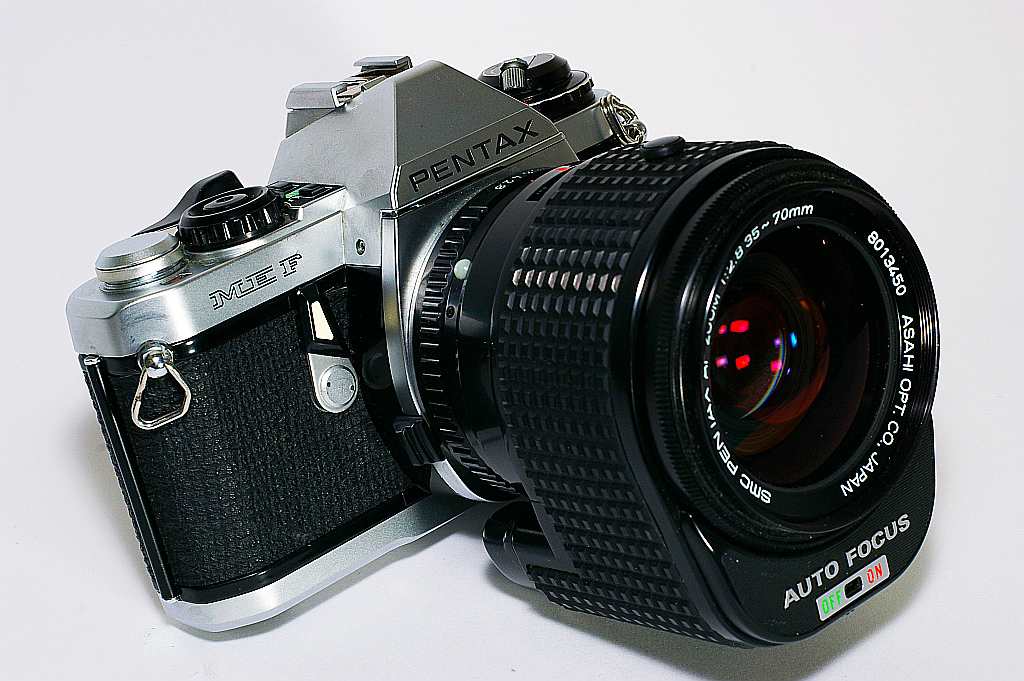
Pentax ME F and SMC Pentax-AF 35-70/2.8, the only products using the K_{F}-mount.

The K_{F}-mount was Pentax's first attempt at an autofocus system. This autofocus system used sensors in the camera body and a motor in the lens. The two were connected via five new electrical contacts on the bayonet mount itself. One permitted the lens to turn on the camera's metering and focus sensors, two focused the lens (towards and away from infinity) and two appear to have been unused and may have been reserved for future functionality.

The K_{F}-mount was largely a failure. Only one camera and one lens ever used this mount, the Pentax ME F and SMC Pentax-AF 35-70/2.8. The lens was somewhat large and cumbersome since it had to enclose both the focusing motor (with gears) and batteries to power it. K_{F} and the ME-F are similar in many ways to the system used by Canon in the ill-fated Canon T80, introduced several years later.

The ME F can use all Pentax K-mount lenses which feature an aperture ring. The 35–70 mm lens can be used on all other Pentax K-mount bodies in manual focus mode, but it must be used stopped down on “modified" K_{AF} bodies.

=== K_{A}-mount ===
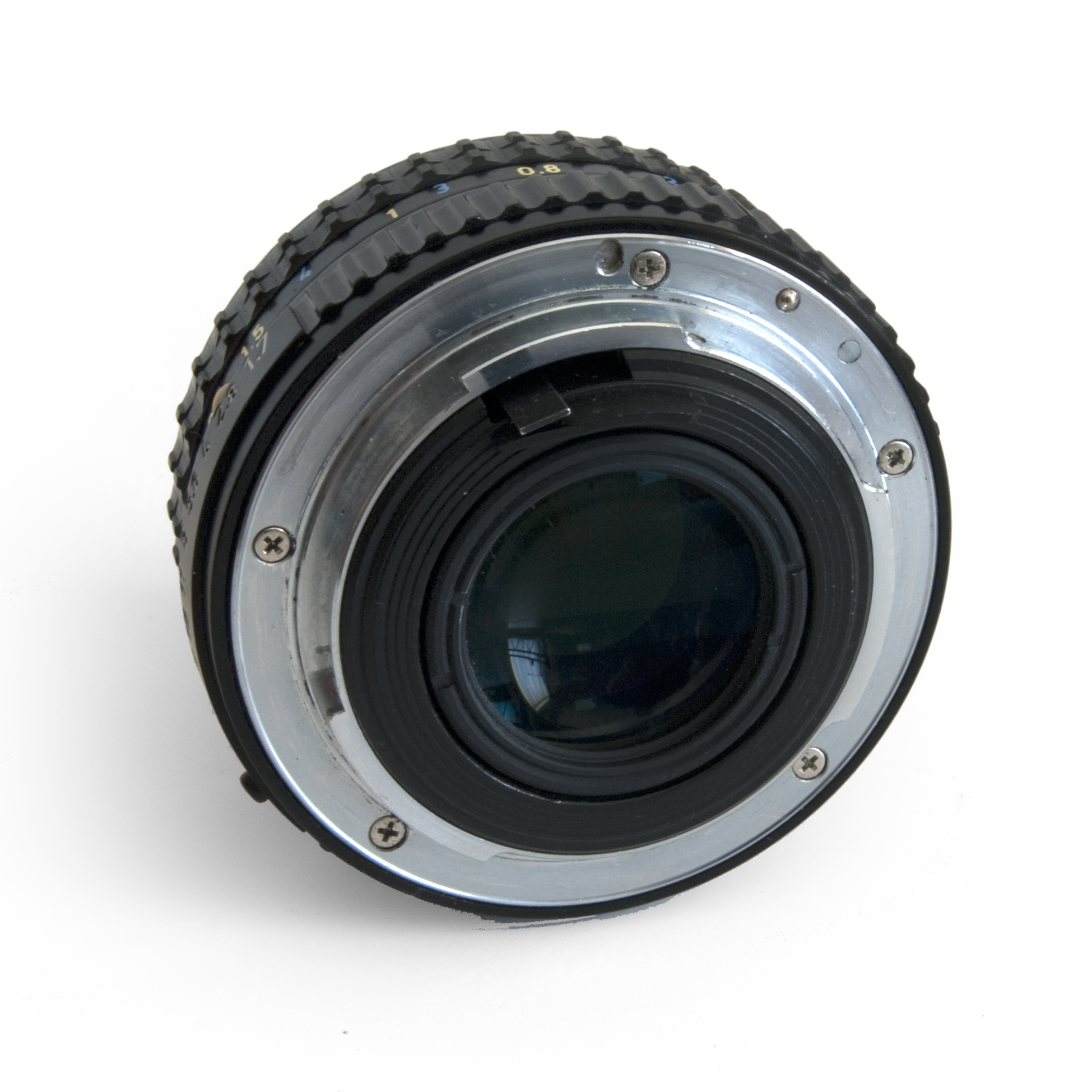
Pentax A 50 mm lens displaying the K_{A}-mount

The K_{A}-mount is derived from the original K-mount. It allows the lens's aperture to be set by the body, and thus permits shutter priority and program auto exposure modes. It was introduced in 1983, and is supported by A-series and P-series bodies; Pentax lenses that support it are marked 'SMC Pentax-A'. It is completely backward-compatible with the original K-mount.

The aperture on the lens is set from the body by the same stop-down lever found on the original K-mount, but on K_{A}-lenses this lever is proportional to the area of the aperture opening, rather than the diameter as on previous lenses. This allows the body to easily set a specific aperture, since the relationship to F stops is linear. The lenses add an 'A' setting on the aperture dial, which gives the body control of the aperture. Other, numeric settings are used for manual aperture modes—aperture priority and full manual mode.

Six electrical contacts are added to the bayonet ring. One is slightly recessed and allows the lens to indicate whether the aperture ring is set at 'A' or not. If it is, a pin on the lens extends slightly and makes contact, while if the lens is at any other setting the pin is retracted and does not make contact. The other five contacts are used to encode the lens's aperture range. Each contact on the lens is either conducting or non-conducting, providing a binary 1 or 0, respectively. Two contacts encode the lens's minimum aperture—f/16, f/22, f/32 or f/45; although no Pentax K-mount lens has ever had an f/16 minimum aperture, OEM lenses often have. The other three contacts encode the lens's maximum aperture; their meaning is dependent on the minimum aperture indicated by the lens. (There are at least 2 newer lenses that have a minimum aperture of only f/16: HD D FA 85mm F1.4 and HD D FA* 50mm F1.4. https://www.pentaxforums.com/lensreviews/hd-pentax-d-fa-85mm-f14-sdm-aw.html and https://www.pentaxforums.com/lensreviews/hd-pentax-d-fa-50mm-f14-sdm-aw.html)

=== K_{AF}-mount ===
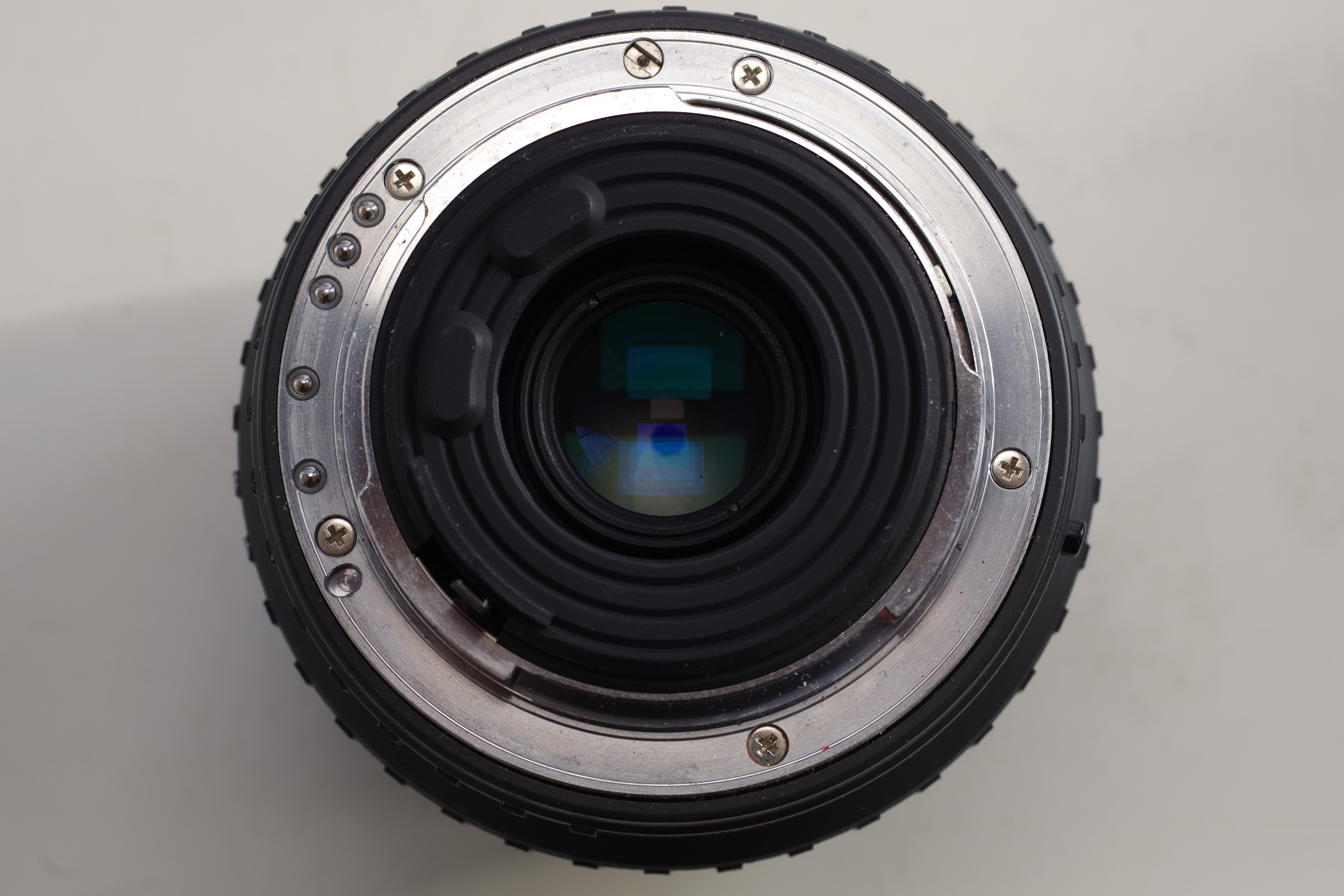
PENTAX-F lens with K_{AF} mount; note mechanical coupling (at 12 o'clock position) for in-body focus motor, seventh (digital) contact at 9 o'clock, and K_{A} aperture encoding pins between 9 and 10 o'clock.

The K_{AF}-mount was Pentax's second and much improved attempt at adding auto-focus to lenses. It adds a small drive shaft to the K_{A}-mount, allowing the body to adjust the focus of the lens. This makes the lenses less bulky than the earlier K_{F}-mount, which had both a motor and batteries inside the lens.

It also adds a seventh electrical contact, this one carrying digital information from the lens to the camera. It carries the following information: focal length, distance to the subject, exact absolute f-stop value, and lens size. This information is used to make better exposure decisions, along with the multi-segmented metering that was introduced in cameras using the K_{AF}-mount.

The MZ-30/ZX-30, MZ-50/ZX-50, MZ-60/ZX-60, the *ist series and the K100D/K110D lack the mechanical stop-down coupler/indicator. In these cameras – in aperture priority mode – the aperture is set by a dial on the camera body, and no longer on the lens. Pre-A lenses can only be used in manual stop down metering mode and manual flash mode.

=== K_{AF2}-mount ===
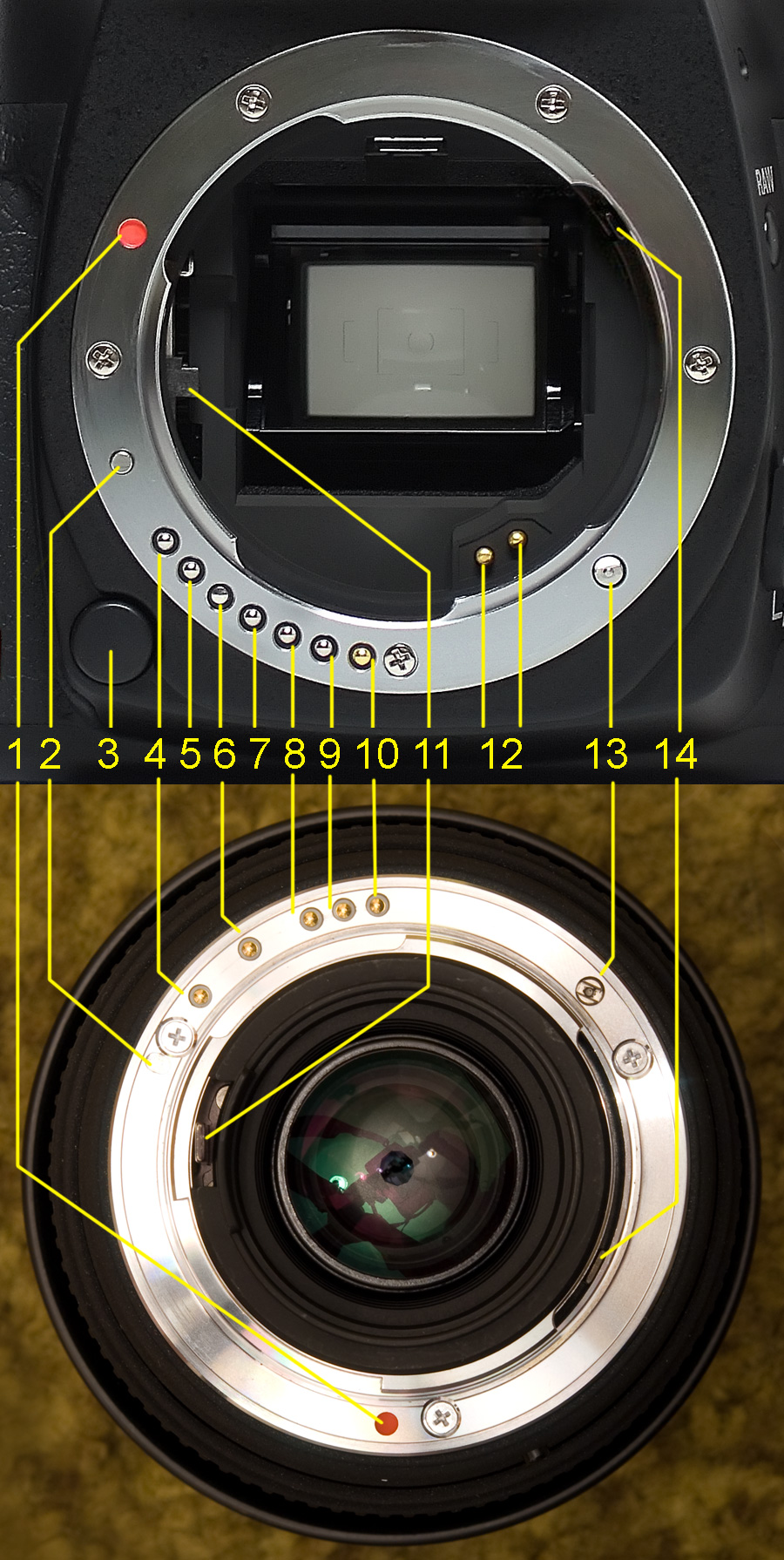
Pentax K_{AF2} mount (body and lens). 1. alignment marker 2. locking pin 3. lens release button 4. digital lens information contact 5.–10. electrical lens information contacts 11. aperture control lever 12. power contacts 13. screw-drive auto focus drive shaft 14. aperture simulator

The K_{AF2}-mount is the same as the K_{AF}-mount except that it adds two extra power contacts to the inside of the mounting ring and transmits modulation transfer function (MTF) data through the digital seventh contact. The power contacts were originally used for power zooming. Since the introduction of the K10D digital SLR model, they are mainly used for powering Silent Drive Motor and DC motor lenses.

The K10D/K100D Super and later cameras do not have a mechanical stop-down coupler/indicator and thus can only use stop-down metering on pre-A lenses.

=== K_{A2}-mount ===
The K_{A2} is identical to K_{AF}, but lacks the autofocus drive shaft. Another way of looking at it is that it adds the seventh contact for digital information to the K_{A}-mount.

=== K_{AF3}-mount ===
The K_{AF3}-mount is used on Pentax lenses that solely rely on SDM or DC autofocus motors. It is identical to the K_{AF2}, but lacks the screw-drive autofocus drive shaft. Another way of looking at it is that it adds the power zoom/in-lens autofocus motor contacts to the K_{A2} mount.

=== K_{AF4}-mount ===
The K_{AF4}-mount was introduced in June 2016 with the HD Pentax-DA 55-300mm F4.5-6.3 ED PLM WR RE lens. It is identical with K_{AF3}, apart from the missing aperture control lever. Instead, aperture control information is transmitted digitally through the data pin and the aperture is stopped down through a motor built into the lens. It also introduced a new type of autofocus motor, designated PLM or Pulse Motor. At the time of its introduction, the following Pentax DSLR bodies were compatible with the new mount: K-70, K-50, K-S2, K-S1, K-1, K-3 II, with all but the K-70 requiring a firmware update. Also after a recent firmware update the original K3 can use the new mount.

=== K-mount without aperture simulator coupling ===
All digital K-mount Pentax SLR bodies as well as some lower-end film cameras lack the ability to read the position of the aperture simulator. This means that lenses that lack the lens information contacts introduced with the K_{A}-mount (Pentax K- and M-series lenses as well as some third-party products) do not support open-aperture metering on these bodies. Instead, stop-down metering must be carried out by pushing the “green button” on the camera before taking a shot. This variation of the mount is commonly referred to as the “modified“ K-mount.

=== R-K-mount ===
The R-K-mount is a variation on the original K-mount by Ricoh. It supports Ricoh's own implementation of shutter priority and auto exposure modes, similar to the K_{A}-mount but much simpler. The only addition to the original K-mount is a small pin, commonly dubbed Ricoh pin, at the bottom which tells the body when the aperture ring has been set to the “P" setting (similar to the “A" setting on Pentax K_{A} lenses). The 'P' setting is not compatible with the 'A' setting as the 'P' pin is in a different location than the 'A' contact on Pentax 'A' lenses and the flange on Pentax bodies.

The R-K-mount is used on Rikenon P lenses, Ricoh bodies that include the letter 'P' in their model number, and some non-Ricoh lenses. It is compatible with all other K-mount cameras and lenses when in manual or aperture-priority exposure modes, however the extra pin needs to be removed for safe use on autofocus Pentax cameras, as it can otherwise become locked within the autofocus shaft. Lenses locked to the camera body this way are difficult to remove and may require complete dismantling.

== Compatibility within the K-mount ecosystem ==
While the common K-mount allows any Pentax lens suited for the mount to be adapted to any Pentax camera having any of its variation, not all features are compatible across different generations of mounts and lenses.

Pentax K-mount lens function compatibility
Bayonet >	K, M	A	F, FA, D-FA	FA Powerzoom	FA-J	DA, DA-L	DA-SDM, DA-DCM (K_{AF3})	DA, D-FA (K_{AF4})
Main changes: Camera	First K-mount version	A-position, electrical contacts	Screw drive, with contacts for serial communication	Two contacts for Powerzoom	Aperture ring abandoned	Small image circle	In lens autofocus motor	electromagnetic aperture control
K (K-series, M-series, LX)	M, Av	M, Av	M, Av	M, Av	X	X	X	X
K_{A} (A-series, P-series)	M, Av	M, Av, Tv, P	M, Av, Tv, P	M, Av, Tv, P	Tv, P	(Tv, P)^{1}	(Tv, P)^{1}	X
K_{AF}	M, Av	M, Av, Tv, P	M, Av, Tv, P, AF	M, Av, Tv, P, AF	Tv, P, AF	(Tv, P)^{1}	(Tv, P)^{1}	X
K_{AF2} (MZ-S, MZ-3, MZ-5 etc.)	M, Av	M, Av, Tv, P	M, Av, Tv, P, AF	M, Av, Tv, P, AF, PZ	Tv, P, AF	(Tv, P)^{1}	(Tv, P)^{1}	X
K_{A2} (MZ-M/ZX-M)	M, Av	M, Av, Tv, P	M, Av, Tv, P	M, Av, Tv, P	Tv, P	(Tv, P)^{1}	(Tv, P)^{1}	X
K_{AF} without aperture simulator (MZ-30/ZX-30, *ist)	M	M, Av, Tv, P	M, Av, Tv, P, AF	M, Av, Tv, P, AF	M, Av, Tv, P, AF	(M, Av, Tv, P, AF)^{1}	(M, Av, Tv, P)^{1}	X
K_{AF} digital without aperture simulator (*istD, *istDS, *istDL, K100D, K110D)	M+, Av0	M, Av, Tv, P	M, Av, Tv, P, AF	M, Av, Tv, P, AF	M, Av, Tv, P, AF	M, Av, Tv, P, AF	M, Av, Tv, P	X
K_{AF2} digital Powerzoom without aperture simulator (K10D)	M+, Av0	M, Av, Tv, P	M, Av, Tv, P, AF	M, Av, Tv, P, AF, PZ ^{2}	M, Av, Tv, P, AF	M, Av, Tv, P, AF	M, Av, Tv, P, SDM/DCM ^{2}	X
K_{AF2} digital SDM without aperture simulator (K100D Super, K20D, K200D, K-m, K-7, K-5, K-5II, K-x, K-01)	M+, Av0	M, Av, Tv, P	M, Av, Tv, P, AF	M, Av, Tv, P, AF	M, Av, Tv, P, AF	M, Av, Tv, P, AF	M, Av, Tv, P, SDM/DCM	X
K_{AF2} digital SDM without aperture simulator and with ED-interface: K-70. After update of firmware: K-50, K-1, K-3, K-3II, K-S2, K-S1.	M+, Av0	M, Av, Tv, P	M, Av, Tv, P, AF	M, Av, Tv, P, AF	M, Av, Tv, P, AF	M, Av, Tv, P, AF	M, Av, Tv, P, SDM/DCM	M, Av, Tv, P, SDM/DCM/PLM

Legend:

- ^{1} – Image circle not sufficient or borders with vignetting or optical aberrations
- ^{2} – K10D can be updated to change from Powerzoom-use to SDM-drive.
- AF – Screw drive autofocus
- Av – Aperture priority
- Av0 – Aperture priority only with open aperture
- DCM – Autofocus with direct current motor (K10D with firmware version 1.3)
- M – manual exposure with exposure display
- M+ – manual exposure with automatic working aperture metering, no exposure display
- P – Program AE
- PLM - Autofocus with pulse motor
- PZ – Powerzoom (K10D with limited capatibility only)
- SDM – Autofocus with supersonic motor (K10D with firmware version 1.3)
- Tv – Time priority
- X – not useful, because smallest aperture always set

Comments:

- On cameras with K_{AF}/K_{AF2}-mount without aperture simulator during Av metering the aperture has to be adjusted on the camera.

== Adaptors to use on K-mount ==
=== L39 / LTM ===
Adaptors can be found to allow use of lenses with Leica M39 thread (screw) mount. If a lens originally intended for Leica Rangefinder cameras is used, focusing is limited to about 10 cm. However, some SLR lenses were made in LTM 39 mount, mostly by KMZ for use in the early Zenit SLRs which had LT 39 mounts. These “Zenit" TM 39 lenses will focus properly. Or these lenses can be used in conjunction with the M42 to LTM 39 adapter.

=== M39 ===
Adaptors can be found to allow use of a non-Leica 39 mm mount into the K-mount, typically as a M39-M42 adapter ring that is mounted in a M42-PK adapter; they may focus to infinity.

=== M42 ===
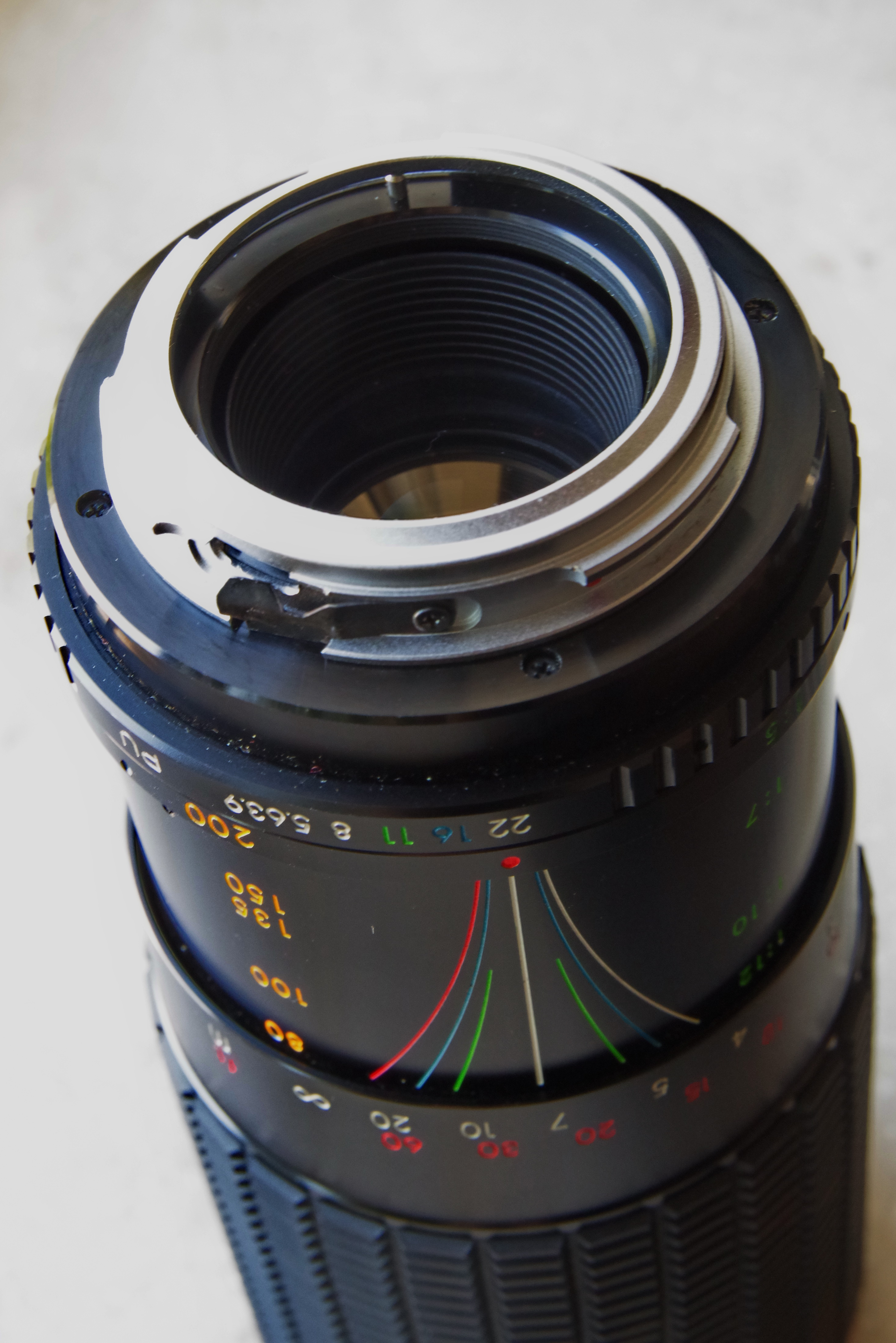
M42 lens (Beroflex) with Pentax K-mount adapter

Pentax supplies adapters to fit M42 screw-mount lenses, as do several third-party manufacturers. The M42 screw-mount system was used by Pentax prior to the introduction of the K-mount. Pentax designed the K-mount wide enough to allow an adapter to fit between the M42 thread and the K bayonet. They also kept the same flange focal distance (also called registration distance or register) as the M42 screw-mount, so that M42 lenses focus correctly using the correct adapter (such as Pentax original or Bower). There are however other third-party adapters that add to the flange focal distance so that one loses the ability to focus to infinity. The loss of infinity-focus may not be significant in macro or close-up photography.

There is great debate in the Pentax community over the applicability and safety of adapters other than those supplied by Pentax. Many users of third-party infinity-focus adapters, such as Bowers, report difficulty in removing the adapters from camera bodies. Such adapters may require modification before they may be safely used. Official Pentax adapters, and flanged non-infinity-focus adapters, do not provoke such problems.

Many old M42 lenses have a modern-day cult reputation, including the (Pentax) Asahi Takumar range. Some manufacturers, including Carl Zeiss AG, still make lenses in the M42-mount. K-mount cameras have a suitable flange focal distance (45.46 mm) to adapt old M42 lenses without any optical correction or loss of infinity focus/changed close focus distance. Other SLRs with a short flange-focal distance can accept M42 lenses as well: Canon EF-mount (44.00 mm), Sony and (Konica) Minolta A-mount (44.50 mm), Sigma (44 mm), Olympus 4/3rd (38.67 mm), and many more, but notably not Nikon F-mount (46.5 mm).

=== Nikon AI/AIS ===
Optically corrected adapter to use Nikon AIS AI lenses on K-mount.

=== Voigtländer Bessamatic / Kodak Retina ===
Adapter for Voigtländer Bessamatic and Voigtländer Ultramatic lenses, Kodak Retina Reflex, or Kodak Retina IIIs lenses.

=== Petri ===
There are some Petri adapters to K-mount but they do not allow to infinity focus due to the different flange distance.

=== Medium format ===
Pentax made adapters for its medium-format lenses to use on the K-mount, both the 645 and 6×7, and for the Hasselblad Bayonet type. Also there is a Pentacon-Six (Kiev88 CM) adapter still in production and a shift adapter to use Pentacon lenses as shift lens.

- Pentax 645
- Pentax 6×7
- Hasselblad Bayonet type
- Pentacon Six
- Mamiya 645

=== T-mount ===
Mounts used for telescopes, microscopes and generic optics. The T-mount was initially developed by Tamron (1957) to allow the easy adaption of generic 35 mm SLR optics into multiple mounts. The T-mount is a 42 mm diameter 0.75 mm pitch screw mount with a 55 mm flange focal distance. Later versions (T2, T4, TX) were more advanced and complex. Several other manufacturers besides Tamron have used these mounts. Because the T-mount is still used for many telescopes and microscopes, they are still available new. Note that while both T-mount and M42-mount are 42mm screw mount systems, and will mount if they are forced, they are not compatible. The difference in pitch can cause damage to the lens, adapter or camera mount if they are confused.

=== Adaptall ===
These are adaptors designed by Tamron to allow the transfer of aperture setting from lens to camera or vice verse, including the Adapt-A-matic (1969), Adaptall (1973) and Adaptall-2 (1979). When Pentax introduced the KA-mount in 1983 Tamron upgraded their Adaptall-2 K-mount into an Adaptall-2 KA-mount. For more details see the Tamron article or the Adaptall-2 web site.

== Available adaptors for other cameras to use K-mount ==
- Four Thirds (Olympus)
- Micro Four Thirds (Olympus and Panasonic)
- Canon EF-mount (EOS)
- Minolta/Sony A-mount (Sony Alpha)
- M39 lens mount (Leica)
- Samsung NX-mount
- Sony E-mount (NEX)
- Fujifilm X-mount

== Cameras ==
=== Pentax ===
Manual focus

- K – K2, K2 DMD, KX, KM, K1000, K1000 SE
- K – ME, ME SE, ME Super, ME Super SE, MG, MV, MV1, MX
- K – LX
- K_{A} – Super A, Program A/Program Plus, A3
- K_{A} – P3, P5, P30, P30n, P30t
- K_{A2} – MZ-M

Auto focus

- K_{F} – ME F
- K_{AF} – SFX, SFXn, SF7, MZ-6, MZ-7
- K_{AF2} – Z-1, Z-1p, Z-5, Z-10, Z-20, Z-50, Z-70
- K_{AF2} – MZ-S, MZ-3, MZ-5, MZ-5n, MZ-10
- “modified" K_{AF} – MZ-30, MZ-50, MZ-60, *istD, *istDS(2), *istDL(2), K100D, K110D
- “modified" K_{AF2} – K10D, K100D Super, K20D, K200D, K2000 (K-m), K-7, K-x, K-r, K-5, K-5 II, K-5 IIs K-01, K-30, K-3, K-3 II, K-1, K-1 II

=== Almaz ===
- 101
- 102
- 103
- 104

=== Chinon ===
- CE-4, CE-4s, CA-4, CA-4s, CM-4, CM-4s
- CE-5, CG-5, CM-5, CP-5, CP5s
- CP-6, CP-X
- CP-7m, CM-7
- CP-9AF

=== Carena ===
- KSM-1

=== Cimko ===
- ksx sears 35 mm film and a 50 mm lens

=== Cosina ===
- C1, C1s
- CS-2, CS-3
- CT-10, CT-1A, CT-20, CT-7, CT-1G, CT-9, CT-4
- CE-4, CE-4s, CE-5

=== Edixa ===
- CX 5

=== Exakta ===
- HS-1
- HS-2
- HS-4
- HS-10
- HS-40
- KE 5

=== Lindenblatt ===
- KL-2

=== Miranda ===
- MS-1
- MS-2 Super
- MS-3

=== Porst ===
- Compact Reflex OC
- Compact Reflex OCN

=== Promaster ===
- Promaster 2500 PK

=== Quantaray ===
- D2-RZ

=== Ricoh ===
- KR-5, KR-5 Super, KR-5 Super II, KR-5 III, KR-10, KR-10 Super, KR-10M, KR-30sp
- XR-1, XR-1s, XR-2, XR-2s, XR-500, XR500 auto, XR-6, XR-7, XR-10, XR-P, XR-20sp, XR-Solar, XR-M, XR-F, XR-P, XR-S, XR-X, XR-X 3PF

=== Samsung ===
- “modified" K_{AF} - GX-1S, GX-1L
- “modified" K_{AF2} - GX-10, GX-20

=== Sears ===
A lot of Sears cameras were made by Ricoh or Chinon and use the Pentax K-mount. Some are simply rebadged models, while others are quite different.

- KS-1000 (Ricoh XR-1)
- KS-500 (Ricoh XR-500)
- KS Auto (Ricoh XR-2S)
- KS-1
- KS-2 (Ricoh XR-7)
- KSX (Ricoh KR-10)
- KSX-P (Chinon CP-5)
- KS Super
- KS Super II

=== Sigma ===
- SA-1

=== Topcon ===
- RM300

=== Vivitar ===
- V635
- V4000
- V3800N
- V3000N
- V3000s
- V2000
- XV1 (rebadged Cosina CT-1)
- XV20 (rebadged Cosina CT-20)

=== Cosina Voigtländer ===
- Cosina Voigtländer VSL 43 (2004)

=== Zenit ===
- Automat, 20, 21, 22, 14, photosniper FS-5
- AM, AM2, AP, 2000, APK, KM, 122K, 212K

== List of lenses with any K-mount variant ==
=== Access ===
- Access 28 mm f2.8 P-MC Macro (49 mm filter)
- Access 75–300 mm f5.6 PMC Zoom (55 mm filter)

=== Angenieux ===
Angenieux a lens manufacturer in France, mainly known for its movie equipment than for photographic lenses, but it has built optics for Leica, Nikon, Canon and a few K-mount lenses.

- Angenieux 70–210 mm f3.5

=== Agfa ===
The Agfa K mount cameras were rebadged Chinons.

- Agfa Color 50 mm f1.4 (49 mm filter)

=== Arsat ===
Arsat is a trade mark of Ukrainian lens manufacturer Arsenal, Kiev.

- PCS Arsat 35 mm f2.8 Shift Lens

=== Beroflex ===
Beroflex seems to have been a German commercial firm of photographic lenses;information is scarce yet but it appears that it designed lenses made overseas by Japanese companies like Soligor.

- Beroflex 85–210 mm f3.8
- Beroflex 500 mm f8/f22 lens, 5° view; 72 mm diameter × 42 mm. Adapter fitted for use on M42 screw thread. In 1975 came complete with lens caps and case.

=== Braun ===
Carl Braun Camera-Werk of Nuremberg, Germany, or Braun, as it was more commonly called, was founded as an optical production house. It is best known for its 35mm film cameras named Paxette, and for slide projectors named Paximat.

- Braun Ultralit Zoom 28–70 mm f3.4-4.8

=== Carl Zeiss Jena ===
Carl Zeiss of East Germany marketed a number of lenses for the K-mount through its sales network. These lenses were in fact made by Sigma in Japan. The “real" 35 mm East German made Carl Zeiss Jena Lenses were available at the same time but only in Praktica B-mount.

- Carl Zeiss Jena 20 mm f4 (zebra)
- Carl Zeiss Jena II 24 mm f2.8
- Carl Zeiss Jena 28 mm f2.8
- Carl Zeiss Jena 28–70 mm f2.8-4.3 Macro Jenazoom
- Carl Zeiss Jena 70–210 mm f4.5-5.6 Macro
- Carl Zeiss Jena 75–300 mm f4.5-5.6 ED IF MC Macro Jenazoom
- Carl Zeiss Jena 100–500 mm f5.6-8 MC Macro Jenazoom (72 mm filter)

=== Carl Zeiss ===
Carl Zeiss is one of the most prestigious names on the photographic world; it re-launched its line of lenses for the K-mount in 2008, mainly due to the growing popularity of both Pentax and Samsung digital SLRs. Carl Zeiss announced in September 2010 that the ZK lenses would be discontinued that year.

- Carl Zeiss 18 mm f3.5 Distagon T* (June 2008)
- Carl Zeiss 21 mm f2.8 Distagon T* (September 2008) (Europe Only)
- Carl Zeiss 25 mm f2.8 Distagon T* ZK (2008)
- Carl Zeiss 35 mm f2 Distagon T* ZK (2008)
- Carl Zeiss 50 mm f1.4 Planar T* ZK (2008)
- Carl Zeiss 50 mm f2 Planar T* ZK (2008)
- Carl Zeiss 50 mm f2 Makro-Planar T* ZK (August 2008)
- Carl Zeiss 85 mm f1.4 Planar T* ZK (2008)
- Carl Zeiss 100 mm f2 Makro-Planar T* ZK

=== Chinon ===
- Chinon 24 mm f2.5
- Chinon 28 mm f2.8
- Chinon 35 mm f2.8 AUTO CHINON MULTI-COATED (49 mm filter)
- Chinon 35–70 mm f3.3-4.5 MC Auto Focus (52 mm filter)
- Chinon 35–70 mm f3.5-4.5 MC Macro (55 mm filter)
- Chinon 35–80 mm f3.5-4.9 MC Macro
- Chinon 35–100 mm f3.5-4.3 multicoated CLOSE FOCUS (67 mm filter)
- Chinon 45 mm f2.8 Auto Multicoated
- Chinon 50 mm f1.4 Auto Multicoated
- Chinon 50 mm f1.7 Auto Multicoated
- Chinon 50 mm f1.7 Auto Multicoated Auto Focus (58 mm filter)
- Chinon 50 mm f1.9 Auto (52 mm filter)
- Chinon 135 mm f2.8 Auto Multicoated
- Chinon 200 mm f3.3 Auto Multicoated
- Chinon Makinon 500 mm f8 catadioptric

=== Cima Kogaku ===
Cima Kogaku had a patented system that allowed them to build common lens bodies, and add the appropriate lens mount at the factory. The Pentax version was only K-mount, not KA-mount. They mostly sold their lenses on an OEM basis, with them sold under a variety of different brands. In the UK, they were sold by Photax as Super-Paragon PMC lenses. Tokyo Kogaku sold them as AM Topcor lenses for their Topcon RM300 camera. Cima Kogaku also sold them directly under the Cimko brand. (Some of the lenses below may not have ever been sold under the Cimko brand.)

- Cimko MT 24 mm f2.8
- Cimko MT 28 mm f2.8
- Cimko MT 35 mm f2.8
- AM Topcor 55 mm f1.7
- Cimko MT 135 mm f2.8
- Cimko MT 200 mm f3.3
- Cimko MT 28–50 mm f3.5-4.5 (two touch)
- Cimko MT 28–50 mm f3.5-4.5 (one touch)
- Cimko MT 28–80 mm f3.5-4.5
- Cimko MT 35–100 mm f3.5-4.3
- Cimko MT 55–230 mm f3.5-4.5
- Cimko MT 70–200 mm f3.8-4.8
- Cimko MT 80–200 mm f3.8
- Cimko MT 80–200 mm f4.5

=== Cosina ===
- Cosina 19–35 mm f3.5-4.5 AF
- Cosina 24 mm f2.8 MC macro (KA-mount)
- Cosina 28 mm f2.8 macro (KA-mount)
- Cosina 28–210 mm f4.2-6.5 Aspherical AF
- Cosina 28–210 mm f3.5 Aspherical AF
- Cosina 28 mm f2.8
- Cosina 35–70 mm f3.5-4.8
- Cosina 40 mm f2.5
- Cosina 50 mm f1.2
- Cosina 50 mm f2
- Cosina 55 mm f1.2
- Cosina 100 mm f3.5 AF macro
- Cosina 100–300 mm f5.6 AF macro
- Cosina 135 mm 1:2,8 MC

=== Cosmicar ===
Cosmicar is a division of Pentax, it commercialized video lenses, but some were released for the K-mount.

- MC Cosmicar 28 mm f2.8 (28 mm filter)
- MC Cosmicar 28–80 mm f3.5-4.5 (Macro at 80 mm end; KA mount)
- Cosmicar 70–200 mm f4

=== CPC ===
CPC Lenses are also known as Phase 2 or Phase 2 CCT.

- CPC 28 mm f2.8 Auto A (52 mm filter)
- CPC 28-80 f2.8-4.0 (62 mm filter)
- CPC 28–80 mm f3.5-4.5
- CPC 28–85 mm f3.5-4.5
- CPC 135 mm f2.8 MC Auto A (55 mm filter)

=== Eikor ===
- Eikor 28mm f2.8 (49mm filter)
- Eikor 80-200mm f4.5 (55mm filter)

=== Focal ===
- Focal 28 mm f2.8 MC Auto (52 mm filter)
- Focal 28 mm f2.8 MC Auto (55 mm filter)
- Focal 135 mm f2.8 MC Auto (58 mm filter)

=== Gemini ===
- Gemini 28 mm f2.8 (49 mm filter)
- Gemini 1:4.5 80-200mm Macro MC Zoom 55 (55mm filter thread size).

=== Hanimex ===
Hanimex was an Australian distributor founded by Jack Hannes after the Second World War. The name is a contraction of HANnes IMport and EXport and the company imported both European and Japanese lenses, bodies and accessories. Hannes apparently sought low cost providers and Hanimex lenses have a poor reputation among users.

- Hanimex AUTO ZOOM f3.5-4.5
- Hanimex AUTOMATIC-MC-MACRO 135 f2.8
- Hanimex MC 80–200 mm f4.5

=== Hervic Zivnon ===
- Hervic Zivnon 23 mm f3.5(62 mm filter)

=== Helios ===
Made for the Zenit cameras by KMZ

- MC Helios 44K-4 58 mm f2 (52 mm filter)
- MC Helios 77K-4 50 mm f1.8

=== Hoya ===
Hoya, a leading manufacturer of optical glass, purchased Pentax in 2008.

- Hoya 24mm f2.8 HMC
- Hoya 28 mm f2.8 HMC (52 mm filter)
- Hoya 28–50 mm f3.5-4.5 HMC (55 mm filter)
- Hoya 28–85 mm f4 HMC (72 mm filter)
- Hoya 70–150 mm f3.8 HMC (55 mm filter)
- Hoya 100–300 mm f5 macro HMC (62 mm filter)
- Hoya 135 mm f2.8 macro HMC (52 mm filter)
- Hoya 300mm f5.6 HMC
- Hoya 135mm f2.8 HMC
- Hoya 200mm f4.0 HMC

=== Irix ===
- Irix 11 mm f/4.0 Blackstone
- Irix 11 mm f/4.0 Firefly
- Irix 15 mm f/2.4 Blackstone
- Irix 15 mm f/2.4 Firefly

=== JC Penney ===
- JC Penney 135 mm f2.8

=== Kalimar ===
Kalimar was an American distributor of camera equipment from 1952 to 1999 when it was acquired by Tiffen.

- Kalimar 28 mm f2.8 Macro (52 mm filter)
- Kalimar 28–105 mm f3.5-4.5 Macro
- Kalimar 35–70 mm f2.8
- Kalimar 60–300 mm f4-5.6 MC AF (67 mm filter)
- Kalimar 500 mm f8 (72 mm filter) (catadioptric)

=== Kiron ===
Kiron was a third party lens manufacturer, it manufactured lenses for other mounts as well on the decade of 1980-1990

- Kiron 24 mm f2 RL
- Kiron 28 mm f2
- Kiron 28–70 mm f4 Macro (1:4)
- Kiron 105 mm f2.8 Macro (1:1)

=== LOMO ===
LOMO is a Russian photographic manufacturer, it made some lenses for the Almaz camera on K-mount, but caution must be used as the Almaz version has some differences with the standard K-mount

- Volna-10K 35 mm f1.8
- Volna 50 mm f1.8, kit lens for Almaz-103 kamera.

=== Lester A. Dine ===
- Lester A. Dine Kiron 105 mm f2.8 macro (52 mm filter)

=== Lensbaby ===
- Lensbaby 1.0 Selective Focus Lens (2006–2008)
- Lensbaby 2.0 Selective Focus Lens **(2008)**
- Lensbaby Muse Double Glass Optic
- Lensbaby Muse Plastic Optic
- Lensbaby Composer
- Lensbaby Scout with Fisheye Optic
- Lensbaby Control Freak

=== Loreo ===
- Loreo 35 mm f11-22 Shift lens (Lens-In-A-Cap)
- Loreo 38 mm f11 3D (Stereo) **(2006–Present)**

=== Luxon ===
Luxon is a Chinese manufacturer, and there is little information available on the company or its products.

- Luxon 50 mm f2.0 MC (China)

=== Mir ===
- Mir-20K 20 mm f3.5 (rear filter)
- Mir-47K 20 mm f2.5 (rear filter), made by VOMZ

=== Miranda ===
Miranda was a brand name used by the Dixons group in the UK, mostly for Cosina made products.

- Miranda 28 mm f2.8 (49 mm filter)
- Miranda 28 mm f2.8 MC (52 mm filter)
- Miranda 50 mm f2 (49 mm filter)
- Miranda 70–210 mm f4 Macro (52 mm filter)
- Miranda 70–210 mm f4.5 Macro
- Miranda 75–200 mm f4.5-5.3 Macro (52 mm filter)

=== Mitakon ===
- Mitakon 80–200 mm f4.5 MC Zoom (55 mm filter)
- Mitakon 28–200 mm f3.8-5.5

=== Makinon ===
Makinon lenses were made by Makina Optical in Japan.

- Makinon MC Reflex 400m f6.7 Macro
- Makinon MC Reflex 500 mm f8 Macro (catadioptric) (67 mm filter)
- Makinon MC ZOOM 35–70 mm 1:2.8 (62 mm filter)
- Makinon MC 135mm 1:2.8 (55 mm filter) not to be confused with the macro version.
- Makinon MC 135mm 1:2.8 (52 mm filter) (non-macro version, has a built-in hood)
- Makinon MC 80-200mm f4.5 Macro (62 mm filter) Manual or Auto Part #744699
- Makinon 28mm 1:2.8

=== Oberon ===
- Oberon-11K 200 mm f2.8

=== Opteka ===
- Opteka OPT500MIR-C 500mm f8

=== Ozunon ===
- Ozunon 35 mm-75 mm F3.5-4.5

=== Panagor ===
Panagor is an alternative name for Kino lenses sold in Europe:

- Panagor-E PMC Auto Zoom 28 mm-80 mm F3.5-4.5

=== Petri ===
Petri was a Japanese camera manufacturer, which tried to capitalize on the popularity of the K-mount lens base and made one camera that used the K-mount with one standard lens:

- Petri 28 mm f2
- Petri 40 mm f2.5 “Pancake"
- Petri 50 mm f2
- Petri 135 mm f2.8

=== Peleng ===
Peleng is a lens manufacturer based in Belarus, it was founded in the Soviet era and released most of its lenses for the M42 mount, but it has a K-mount lens:

- Peleng 8 mm f3.5 (2008)

=== Pentax ===
Bold text indicates lenses in current production/stock sale from Pentax.

==== Special optics ====
- Pentax Stereo Adapter I
- Pentax Stereo Adapter II

==== Teleconverters ====
- SMC Pentax Rear Converter K T6-2x
- SMC Pentax Rear Converter-A 1.4x-L
- SMC Pentax Rear Converter-A 2x-L
- SMC Pentax Rear Converter-A 1.4x-S
- SMC Pentax Rear Converter-A 2x-S
- SMC Pentax-F 1.7x AF Adapter
- HD Pentax-DA AF Rear Converter 1.4x AW (2014)

=== Phoenix ===
- Phoenix 500 mm f8 Reflex (catadioptric) (2006)
- Phoenix 800 mm f8 Reflex (catadioptric) (2008)

=== Polar ===
Polar is a brand of Samyang Optics, a South Korean third party lens manufacturer.

- Polar 800 mm f8 Reflex (catadioptric) (2008)
- Polar 85 mm Portrait Lens f1.4 Aspherical IF (2008)

=== Porst ===
- Porst 28 mm f2.8 MC Auto
- Porst 40 mm f2.5 MC Auto
- Porst 55 mm f1.2 Reflex MC Auto (55 mm filter)
- Porst 55 mm f1.2 MC Auto
- Porst 135 mm f2.8 Tele-AS MC E (55 mm filter)
- Porst 75–260 mm f4.5
- Porst 200 mm f3.5

=== Promaster ===
- Promaster 18–200 mm f3.5-6.3 AF XR EDO
- Promaster 18–200 mm f3.5-6.3 AF XR EDO(2007)
- Promaster 19–35 mm f3.5-4.5 AF
- Promaster 24–200 mm f3.5-5.6 AF XLD ASP
- Promaster 28–80 mm f3.5-5.6 AF
- Promaster 28–70 mm f2.8-4.2 MC Auto ZOOM MACRO
- Promaster 28–70 mm f3.9-4.8 Spectrum 7 MC Macro Auto
- Promaster 28–80 mm f3.5-5.6 Spectrum 7 AF
- Promaster 28–105 mm f4-5.6 AF IF
- Promaster 28–200 mm f3.5-5.6 AF XR
- Promaster 28–210 mm f3.5-5.6 Spectrum 7 MC Macro
- Promaster 50 f1.7
- Promaster 60–300 mm f4-5.6 Spectrum 7 (67 mm filter) (2008)
- Promaster 70–210 mm f4-5.6 AF Macro
- Promaster 70–300 mm f4-5.6 Spectrum 7 AF EDO LD Macro (2007)
- Promaster 80–200 mm f3.5 MC (62 mm filter)
- Promaster 80–210 mm f4.5-5.6 AF
- Promaster 85–210 mm f3.8 Auto Zoom Macro MC
- Promaster 135 mm f1:2.8 MC

=== Quantaray ===
- Quantaray AF 100–300 mm f/4.5-6.7 LDO

=== Revue ===
- Revue 35 mm f2.8
- Revue 80–200 mm f4.5
- Revue 28–70 mm f3.5-4.5
- Revue 28–50 mm f3.5-4.5
- Revue 70–210 mm f4.5 AF

=== Revu ===
- Revu 50 mm f1.2 (1975)

=== Revuenon ===
- Revuenon Auto multicoated 28 mm f/2.8
- Revuenon Auto MC 28 mm f/2.8
- Revuenon Auto 45 mm f/2.8
- Revuenon Auto MC 55 mm f/1.4
- Revuenon Auto MC 55 mm f/1.7
- Revuenon 55 mm f/1.2
- Revuenon 135 mm f/2.8
- Revuenon Auto MC 135 mm f/2.8
- Revuenon 200 mm f/3.3
- Revuenon 200 mm f/3.5
- Revuenon 300 mm f/5.6
- Revuenon 500 mm f/8.0 Mirror

=== Ricoh - Rikenon - Riconar ===
This lens uses the Ricoh KR-mount version, Ricoh made both a XR version without the zoom pin, and the P version which has it.

- Rikenon 24 mm f2.8 (52 mm filter)XR Version
- Rikenon 28 mm f2.8 (52 mm filter)XR Version
- Rikenon 28 mm f3.5 (52 mm filter)XR Version (probably a renamed smc PENTAX-M 28mm f/3.5, very sharp wide-open)
- Rikenon 35 mm f2.8 XR Version
- Rikenon 50 mm f2 (52 mm filter)XR Version
- Rikenon 50 mm f2 L (52 mm filter)XR Version
- Rikenon 50 mm f2 S (52 mm filter)XR Version
- Rikenon 50 mm f1.4 (52 mm filter)XR Version
- Rikenon 50 mm f1.7 (52 mm filter)XR Version
- Riconar 55 mm f2.2 (52 mm filter)
- Rikenon 55 mm f1.2 (58 mm filter)XR Version
- Rikenon 135 mm f2.8 (55 mm filter)XR Version
- Rikenon 200 mm f4 XR
- Rikenon 50 mm f2 (52 mm filter)P Version
- Rikenon 600 mm f8 Reflex XR Version

=== Rokinon ===
This lens uses the Ricoh KR-mount version:

- Rokinon 500 mm f6.3 Reflex (catadioptric)

=== Sakar ===
Sakar is a commercial American company that used to sell K-mount lenses.

- 80–210 mm f1:3.8 macro MC (58 mm filter)
- 85–210 mm f1:4.5 macro MC
- 500 mm f/8 macro mirror (catadioptric)

=== Samyang ===
Samyang is an optical manufacturer located in South Korea. Many of their lenses are also sold under the Rokinon and Bower brand names.

- Samyang 8 mm f/3.5 UMC Fish-eye CS II
- Samyang 10 mm f/2.8 ED AS NCS CS
- Samyang 12 mm f/2.8 AS NCS Fish-eye
- Samyang 14 mm f/2.8 ED S IF UMC
- Samyang 16 mm f/2.0 ED AS UC CS
- Samyang 20 mm f/1.8 ED AS UMC
- Samyang 24 mm f/1.4 ED AS IF UMC
- Samyang Tilt/Shift 24 mm f/3.5 ED AS UC
- Samyang 35 mm f/1.4 AS UMC
- Samyang 50 mm f/1.4 AS UMC
- Samyang 85 mm f/1.4 AS IF UMC
- Samyang 100 mm f/2.8 ED UMC Macro
- Samyang 135 mm f/2.0 ED UMC
- Samyang 100–500 mm f5.6-7.1 Macro Tele Zoom Lens

=== Samsung ===
All these lenses had been marketed by Samsung and present on Samsung's GX-series DSLRs. Schneider-Kreuznach is a traditional optics maker that do still make specialised glass and lenses (today mainly high-quality large-format lenses, enlarger lens and photographic loupes), but not for Samsung. They license their name to Samsung granted that certain minimum quality requirements are fulfilled. All the Schneider branded glass from Samsung is manufactured by Pentax and corresponds directly to Pentax lenses.

- Schneider-Kreuznach D-Xenogon 10–17 mm F3.5-4.5 ED (2007- ) (rebadged Pentax DA 10-17mm lens, 2006-)
- Schneider-Kreuznach D-Xenon 12–24 mm f4 ED (2007- ) (rebadged Pentax DA 12-24mm lens, 2005-)
- Schneider-Kreuznach D-Xenon 18–55 mm f3.5-5.6 AF (2007- ) (rebadged Pentax DA 18-55mm lens, 2004- )
- Schneider-Kreuznach D-Xenogon 35 mm f2 (2006-) (rebadged Pentax FA 35mm lens, 1999-)
- Schneider-Kreuznach D-Xenon 50–200 mm f/4-5.6 AF (2006-) (rebadged Pentax DA 50-200mm lens, 2005-)
- Schneider-Kreuznach D-Xenon 100 mm MACRO 1:2.8 (2007-) (rebadged Pentax D FA 100mm lens, 2004-)

=== Schneider-Kreuznach ===
The Schneider-Kreuznach lenses feature shift and tilt movements for perspective control; they can be shifted by 12 mm and tilted by 8 degrees simultaneously.

- Schneider-Kreuznach PC-TS Super-Angulon 4.5/28 28mm f4.5
- Schneider-Kreuznach PC-TS Super-Angulon 2.8/50 50mm f2.8
- Schneider-Kreuznach PC-TS Makro-Symmar 4.5/90 HM 90mm f4.5

=== Sears ===
Sears is an American commercial company that sells rebranding lenses and cameras at their own stores in the United States for a number of years. As the objective was mainly commercial, quality is very different among lenses. Quality on construction in some ones is very good and in some others is plain bad. But it seems to be consistent among the same model. Some of the Sears lenses were made to fit Sears Cameras with the Ricoh K-mount version and are identified as KR, but is prudent to verify it before using it on more modern cameras that may be damaged by the Ricoh pin.

- Sears 28 mm f/2.8 Auto MC
- Sears 50 mm f/1.4 Auto MC
- Sears 50 mm f/1.7 Auto MC
- Sears 50 mm f/2
- Sears 50 mm f/1.7
- Sears 55 mm f/1.4
- Sears 55 mm f/2
- Sears 28–70 mm f/3.5-4.5 Macro
- Sears 60–300 mm f/4-5.6 Macro (KR-mount)
- Sears 75–260 mm f/4.5 MC Macro
- Sears 80–200 mm f/4-5.6 Auto MC
- Sears MC 135 mm f/2.8
- Sears Auto 2X Teleconverter

=== Sigma ===
Sigma is a Japanese manufacturer of cameras and lenses. It has made lenses for the K-mount for a number of years. And quality among them had varied a lot. After the launch of the K10D digital SLR it launched K-mount D series lenses. Such ones are designed to be used with the APS size camera, but older K-mount can be used as well. An increase in model numbers can be seen between 2007 and 2008 due to the success of the K10D, K100D, K100D Super, K110D, K20D and K200D cameras. Use of older Sigma lenses is possible but with caution, some Sigma older K-mount lenses are with the infamous Ricoh pin.

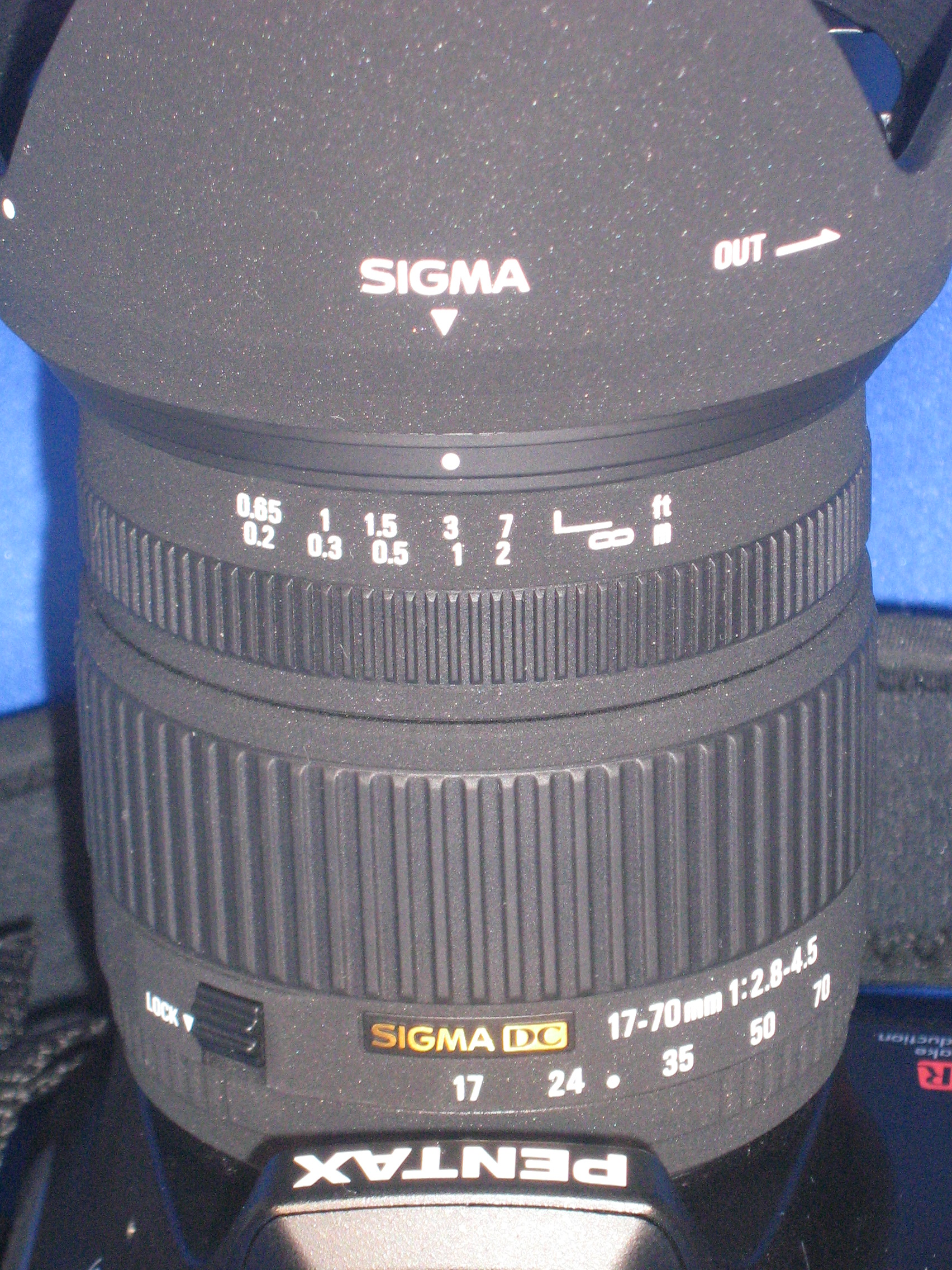
Sigma 17-70 mm lens

- Sigma 8 mm f/3.5 EX DG Fisheye
- Sigma 8–16 mm f/4.5-5.6 DC HSM
- Sigma 10–20 mm f/4.0-5.6 AF EX DC
- Sigma 10–20 mm F/3.5 EX DC HSM
- Sigma 12–24 mm f/4.5-5.6 EX DG
- Sigma 14 mm f/2.8 EX DG
- Sigma 15 mm f/2.8 EX DG Fisheye
- Sigma 15–30 mm f/3.5-5.6 AF EX DG
- Sigma 17–35 mm f/2.8-4 EX ASP
- Sigma 17–50 mm f/2.8 EX DC OS HSM
- Sigma 17–70 mm f/2.8-4.5 DC Macro
- Sigma 17–70 mm f/2.8-4.5 DC Macro (2007)
- Sigma 17–70 mm f/2.8-4 DC Macro OS HSM
- Sigma 18–50 mm f/3.5-5.6 DC AF
- Sigma 18–50 mm f2.8-4.5 DC OS HSM
- Sigma 18–125 mm f/3.8-5.6 DC HSM
- Sigma 18–200 mm f/3.5-5.6 DC
- Sigma 18–250 mm f/3.5-6.3 DC OS HSM
- Sigma 20 mm f/1.8 EX DG ASP
- Sigma 20–40 mm f/2.8 EX DG ASP
- Sigma 24 mm f/1.8 EX DG
- Sigma 24–70 mm f/2.8 IF EX DG HSM
- Sigma 24–70 mm f/3.5-5.6
- Sigma 24–135 mm f/2.8-4.5 IF ASPH AF
- Sigma 28 mm f/1.8 EX DG
- Sigma 28 mm Mini-Wide f/2.8
- Sigma 28–70 mm f/2.8 EX DF ASP
- Sigma 28–300 mm f/3.5-6.3 DL ASP IF
- Sigma 28 mm f/1.8 EX DG
- Sigma 28–300 mm f/3.5-6.3 CHZ ASP
- Sigma 28–200 mm f/3.5-5.6 DL Macro
- Sigma 28–200 mm f/3.5-5.6
- Sigma 28–105 mm f/2.8-4 ASP
- Sigma 28–80 mm f/2.8 EX DF ASP Macro II
- Sigma 28–80 mm f/2.8 EX DF ASP Macro
- Sigma 28–80 mm f/3.5-5.6
- Sigma 30 mm f/1.4 EX DC
- Sigma 35–70 mm f/2.8-4 Macro 1:6.7(52 mm filter)
- Sigma 50 mm f1.4 EX DG HSM
- Sigma 50 mm f/2.8 EX DG Macro
- Sigma 50–150 mm APO f/2.8 EX DC II
- Sigma 50–200 mm f4-5.6 DC O S HSM
- Sigma 50–500 mm f/4-6.3 EX APO HSM
- Sigma 70 mm f/2.8 EX DG Macro
- Sigma 70–200 mm f/2.8 EX DG Macro
- Sigma 70–200 mm f/2.8 EX APO
- Sigma 70–200 mm f/2.8 EX DG OS HSM
- Sigma 70–200 mm f/2.8 EX DG APO Macro MkII
- Sigma 75–210 mm f/3.5-4.5 ZOOM-K III MC
- Sigma 70–300 mm f/4-5.6 DG APO Macro
- Sigma 70–300 mm f/4-5.6 DG Macro
- Sigma 70–300 mm f/4-5.6 DG OS
- Sigma 70–300 mm f/4-5.6 DI LD Macro (2008)
- Sigma 70–300 mm f/4-5.6 DL Macro
- Sigma 70–300 mm f/4-5.6 DG Macro
- Sigma 70–300 mm f/4-5.6 EX APO Macro
- Sigma 75–300 mm f4-5.6 AF
- Sigma 85 mm f/1.4 EX DG HSM
- Sigma 100–200 mm f/4.5 Macro
- Sigma 100–300 mm f/4.5-6.7 DL
- Sigma 100–300 mm f/4 EX APO IF
- Sigma 100–300 mm f/4.5-6.7 DL
- Sigma 105 mm f/2.8 EX DG Macro
- Sigma 120–400 mm f/4.5-5.6 APO DG OS HSM
- Sigma 135–400 mm f/4.5-5.6 APO ASP
- Sigma 150–500 mm f/5.0-6.3 DG OS HSM
- Sigma 170–500 mm f/5-6.3 APO ASP
- Sigma 180 mm f/3.5 EX Macro
- Sigma 300 mm f/2.8 EX DG
- Sigma 500 mm f/4 XQ Reflex (catadioptric)
- Sigma 500 mm f/4.5 EX DG
- Sigma 500 mm f/8 Reflex (catadioptric)
- Sigma 600 mm f/8 Reflex (catadioptric)

=== Soligor ===
- Soligor 70–210 mm f/4.5
- Soligor MC 80/135 f/4 dualfocal
- Soligor 85–205 mm f/3.8
- Soligor MC 90 mm-230 mm f/4.5
- Soligor 135 mm f/2.8
- Soligor 200 mm f/2.8
- Soligor 80/200 mm MC f/4.5
- Soligor C/D 28–200 mm f/3.8-5.5 Macro
- Soligor 35-105/3.5 Macro

=== Spiratone ===
Spiratone was a company devoted to sell photographic accessories and manage to sell some lenses under their own brand name until it closed, very few were made for the K-mount, and none of them are known to be of good quality.

- Spiratone 400 mm f6.3
- Spiratone 500 mm f8 (72 mm filter)

=== Sun ===
- Sun 28–80 mm f3.5-4.5 Macro (62 mm filter)
- Sun 80–200 mm f4.5 Macro (55 mm filter)
- Sun 85–210 mm f4.8 telephoto zoom (55 mm filter)
- Sun 70–140 mm f3.8 auto zoom (49 mm filter)

=== Sunagor ===
- Sunagor 75–300 mm F5.6

=== Suntop ===
- Suntop 28–135 mm f3.8-5.2 MC (67 mm filter)

=== Takumar ===
- Takumar 135 mm f2.5 prime
- Takumar A 28–80 mm f3.5-4.5 Macro

=== Tamron ===
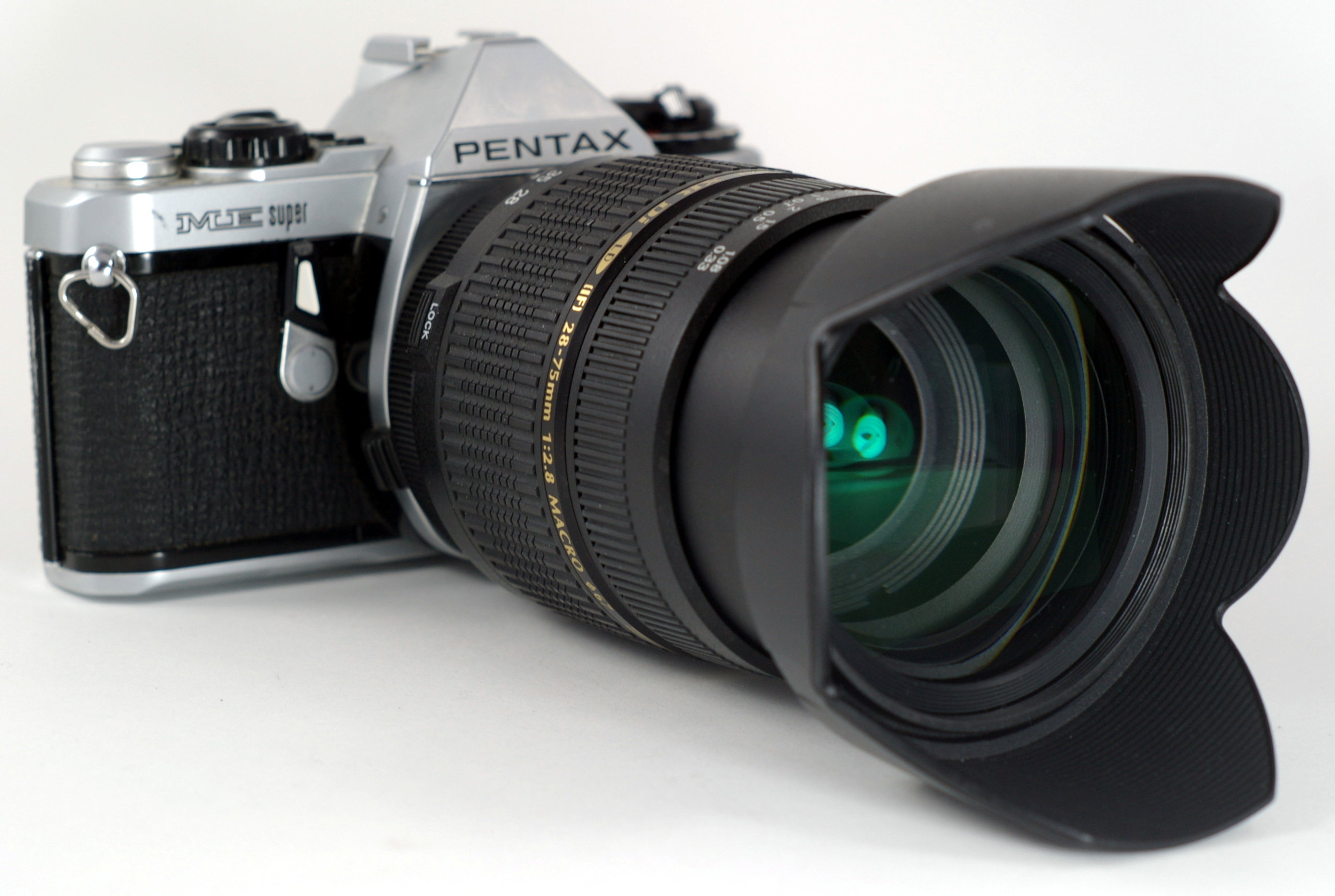
A Tamron 28-75 mm f/2.8 in Pentax K-mount

Tamron is a third party vendor of photographic lenses, quality among them varies a lot. It is important to distinguish the adaptall versions from everything else, the adaptall is a generic adapter that allowed Tamron to manufacture a single lens design for a wide range of cameras, and commercialize those for specific brands with the use of the Adaptall I and Adaptall II adapters. So there are Tamron Lenses on K-mount, and Tamron Adaptall I and II for K- and KA-mount adapters. More Information on the Adaptall can be found on the Tamron article of Wikipedia. Here the non-Adaptall versions:

- Tamron 10–24 mm f/3.5-4.5 Di II LD AF SP Aspherical (IF)
- Tamron 17–50 mm f/2.8 SP AF XR Di-II LD Aspherical IF
- Tamron 18–250 mm f/3.5-6.3 AF Di-II LD Aspherical IF Macro
- Tamron 18–200 mm f/3.5-6.3 XR Di-II LD IF **(2008)**
- Tamron 24 mm f/2.5 (Adaptall 2, two versions (01BB) and (01B)
- Tamron 28–75 mm f/2.8 SP AF XR Di LD Aspherical IF Macro
- Tamron 28–80 mm f/3.5-5.6 AF
- Tamron 28–300 mm f/3.5-6.3 XR DI LD
- Tamron 70–200 mm f/2.8 SP AF
- Tamron 70–300 mm f/4-5.6 DI LD Macro **(2008)**
- Tamron 80–250 mm f/3.8-4.5 Macro (Adaptall) (QZ-825M/QZ-250M)
- Tamron 90 mm f/2.8 SP Di Macro (No Adaptall version)
- Tamron 90 mm f/2.5 Macro (Adaptall)
- Tamron 90 mm f/2.8 SP AFDi 1:1 Macro
- Tamron 300 mm f/2.8 DL (Adaptall)
- Tamron 500 mm f/8 SP (Adaptall 2) Reflex (catadioptric)

=== Tokina ===
- Tokina 17 mm f3.5
- Tokina 28 mm f2.8
- Tokina 90 mm f2.5 macro AT-X
- Tokina 90 mm f2.8 macro
- Tokina 200 mm f3.5
- Tokina 20–35 mm f2.8 AT-X Pro
- Tokina 28–70 mm f/2.6-2.8 AT-X Pro
- Tokina 28–70 mm f2.8
- Tokina 28–70 mm f3.5-4.5 PKA-mount
- Tokina 28–200 mm f3.5-5.3 zoom, 72 mm filter
- Tokina 35–70 mm f3.5-4.6 SZ-X - close focusing zoom and macro
- Tokina 35–105 mm f3.5 RMC - close focusing zoom
- Tokina 60–120 mm f2.8 AT-X (portrait lens, 55 mm filter)
- Tokina 70–210 mm f4.0-5.6 (manual + AF, AF lens was also made for Vivitar)
- Tokina 70–210 mm f4.5
- Tokina 75–150 mm f3.8
- Tokina 80–200 mm f2.8
- Tokina 80–200 mm f4.5-5.6 SZ-X (49 mm filter)
- Tokina 80–400 mm f4.5-5.6 AT-X
- Tokina 150–500 mm f5.6 AT-X SD
- Tokina 500 mm f8 RMC Reflex (catadioptric)

=== Tou/Five Star ===
Tou Five Star was the commercial brand from Toyo Optics; some lenses are labeled as Toyo Optics, Toyo Five Star or Tou Five Star. They were manufactured between 1967 and sometime around 1980, when the company seems to have changed its focus to video lenses.

- Tou/Five Star MC Auto 28 mm 1:2.8 (to f/22) (52 mm)
- Toyo/Five Star MC Auto 28 mm 1:2.8 (to f/16) (52 mm)
- Tou/Five Star 28–80 mm 1:3.5-4.5 macro
- Tou/Five Star 28–135 mm 1:3.5-5.2 macro (67 mm)
- Tou/Five Star MC Auto 35–75 mm 1:3.5-4.8 macro (55 mm)
- Tou/Five Star 70–210 mm 1:4.5-22 macro (55 mm)
- Tou/Five Star 75–200 mm 1:4.5 macro
- Tou/Five Star MC Auto 200 mm 1:4.5 (52 mm)
- Tou/Five Star 500 mm 1:8

=== Venus Optics ===
- Laowa 12 mm f/2.8 Zero-D
- Laowa 15 mm f4 Wide Angle Macro
- Laowa 25 mm f/2.8 2.5-5X Ultra Macro
- Laowa 60 mm f2.8 2X Ultra-Macro
- Laowa 105 mm f/2 Smooth Trans Focus (STF)

=== Vivitar ===
- Vivitar 17 mm f3.5 MC Wide-Angle
- Vivitar 19–35 mm f3.5-4.5 Series 1
- Vivitar 24 mm f2
- Vivitar 24 mm f2.8
- Vivitar 24–70 mm f3.3-4.8 Series 1
- Vivitar 28 mm f2
- Vivitar 28 mm f2.5
- Vivitar 28 mm f2.8
- Vivitar 28–85 mm f2.8-3.8
- Vivitar 28–90 mm f2.8-3.5 Series 1
- Vivitar 28–105 mm f2.8-3.8 Series 1
- Vivitar 35–200 mm f3-4.5 Macro 1:5 (65 mm filter)
- Vivitar 35 mm f2.8 VMC (49 mm filter)
- Vivitar 40 mm f2.5 VMC
- Vivitar 50 mm f1.4 VMC
- Vivitar 50 mm f2 (49 mm filter)
- Vivitar 55 mm f1.2 VMC Series I (58 mm filter)
- Vivitar 70–210 mm f3.5 Macro Zoom Series 1 & f2.8-4 Series 1
- Vivitar 75–200 mm f4.5
- Vivitar 85–205 mm f3.8
- Vivitar 90 mm f2.5 SL I Macro (2002-?)
- Vivitar 90–180 mm f4.5 Macro
- Vivitar 100–500 mm f5.6-8 (67 mm filter) Series 1
- Vivitar 105 mm f2.5 Macro Series 1
- Vivitar 135 mm f2.3 Series 1
- Vivitar 135 mm f2.8
- Vivitar 135 mm f3.5 VMC (49 mm filter)
- Vivitar 200 mm f3 Series 1 (72 mm filter)
- Vivitar 450 mm f4.5 Series 1 aspherical catadioptric
- Vivitar 600 mm f8 Series 1 solid catadioptric
- Vivitar 800 mm f11 Series 1 solid catadioptric

=== Cosina Voigtländer ===
- Cosina Voigtländer Color Skopar 20 mm f3.5 SL-II (2009)
- Cosina Voigtländer 35–70 mm f3.5-4.8 (2004)
- Cosina Voigtländer Ultron Aspherical 40 mm f2 SL-II (2008, limited)
- Cosina Voigtländer Ultron Aspherical 40 mm f2 SL (2007, limited)
- Cosina Voigtländer Nokton 58 mm f1.4 (2008)
- Cosina Voigtländer Nokton 58 mm f1.4 SL-II (2008, SL never available for K-mount)
- Cosina Voigtländer Color-Heliar 75 mm f2.5 (2002-200?)
- Cosina Voigtländer Apo-Lanthar 90 mm f3.5 SL
- Cosina Voigtländer Apo-Lanthar 125 mm f2.5 SL (2002–2006)
- Cosina Voigtländer Apo-Lanthar 180 mm f4 SL (2002–2006)

=== VOMZ ===
Vologda Optical-and-Mechanical Plant.

- Mir-47K 20 mm f2.5
- Oberon-11K 200 mm f2.8

=== Zenitar ===
Zenitar is a Russian lens brand, made by KMZ. Most Zenitar lenses are also available in M42-mount. Some of these are sold as K-mount lenses but use an adapter.

- MC Zenitar-K 16 mm f2.8
- MC Zenitar-K 1:2.8 20 mm
- MC Zenitar-K 1:2.8 28 mm
- MC Zenitar-К 1:1.4 50 mm
- MC Zenitar-K 1:1.9 50 mm
- MC Zenitar-K2 50 mm f2 (1995-?)
- MC Zenitar-1K 1:1.4 85 mm telephoto
- MC APO Telezenitar-K 1:2.8 135 mm telephoto
- MC APO Telezenitar-K 300 mm f4.5 (2008) telephoto
- MC Variozenitar-K 25–45 mm f2.8-3.5 (1980-? version)(60 mm filter) zoom
- MC Variozenitar-K 25–45 mm f2.8-3.5 (2008) zoom
- MC Variozenitar-K 35–100 mm f2.8 (1980?) zoom
- MC Variozenitar-K 1:3.5-4.5 35–105 mm zoom
- MC Variozenitar-K 1:4.0 70–210 mm zoom

==== Special lenses ====
- Zenitar MC 35 mm Tilt & Shift f2.8 (2008)
- Zenitar MC 80 mm Tilt & Shift f2.8 (2008)

Kind	Type	Focal length	Aperture	87	88	89	1990	91	92	93	94	95	96	97	98	99	2000	01	02	03	04	05	06	07	08	09	2010	11	12	13	14	15	16	17	18	19	2020	21	22	23	24	25
Prime	UWA	14	2.8																		DA 14mm f/2.8 ED AL																					
Prime	UWA	15	4.0																							DA 15mm f/4 Limited				HD DA 15mm f/4 ED AL Limited												
Prime	UWA	20	2.8									FA 20mm f/2.8 AL																														
Prime	UWA	21	2.4																																			HD D FA 21mm Limited DC				
Prime	UWA	21	3.2																				DA 21mm f/3.2 AL Limited								HD DA 21mm f/3.2 AL Limited											
Prime	WA	24	2.0					FA* 24mm f/2 AL																																		
Prime	WA	31	1.8															FA 31mm f/1.8 Limited																				HD FA 31mm 1.8 Limited				
Prime	WA	35	2.0													FA 35mm f/2 AL																				HD FA 35mm f/2 WR						
Prime	WA	35	2.4																								DA 35mm f/2.4 AL															
Prime	WA	35	2.8																							DA 35mm f/2.8 Limited Macro					HD DA 35mm f/2.8 Limited Macro											
Prime	normal	40	2.8																		DA 40mm f/2.8 Limited									HD DA 40mm f/2.8 Limited												
Prime	normal	40	2.8																										DA 40mm f/2.8 XS													
Prime	normal	43	1.9											FA 43mm f/1.9 Limited																								HD FA 43mm 1.9 Limited				
Prime	normal	50	1.4	F 50mm f/1.4				FA 50mm f/1.4																																Classic		
Prime	normal	50	1.4																																					HD FA		
Prime	normal	50	1.4																																HD FA* 50 f/1.4 SDM AW							
Prime	normal	50	1.8																										DA 50mm f/1.8 AL													
Prime	normal	50	2.8		F 50 Macro		FA 50mm f/2.8 Macro															D FA 50mm f/2.8 Macro																				
Prime	normal	55	1.4																						DA* 55mm f/1.4 SDM																	
Prime	Short Tele	70	2.4																				DA 70mm f/2.4 Limited								HD DA 70mm f/2.4 Limited											
Prime	Short Tele	77	1.8													FA 77mm f/1.8 Limited																						HD FA 77mm 1.8 Limited				
Prime	Short Tele	85	1.4						FA* 85mm f/1.4																													HD D FA* 85mm 1.4 SDM AW				
Prime	Tele	100	2.8	F 100mm f/2.8 Macro				FA 100mm f/2.8 Macro													D FA 100mm f/2.8 Macro					D FA 2.8 Macro Macro WR														HD D FA AW		
Prime	Tele	135	2.8	F 135mm 2.8					FA 135mm 2.8																																	
Prime	Tele	200	2.8							FA* 200mm f/2.8 ED															DA* 200mm f/2.8 SDM																	
Prime	4.0	200														FA* 200mm f/4 Macro ED																										
Prime	Super tele	300	2.8								FA* 300mm f/2.8 ED																															
Prime	Super tele	300	4.x	F* 300mm f/4.5 ED				FA* 300mm f/4.5 ED																	DA* 300mm f/4 SDM																	
Prime	Super tele	400	5.6											FA* 400mm f/5.6 ED																												
Prime	Ultra tele	560	5.6																										HD DA 560mm f/5.6 ED AW													
Prime	Ultra tele	600	4.0		F* 600mm f/4 ED			FA* 600mm f/4 ED																																		
Zoom	Fisheye		3.5-4.5									F 17-28mm f/3.5-4.5 Fish-Eye														DA 10-17mm f/3.5-4.5 Fish-Eye											HD DA 10-17mm 3.5-4.5 Fish-Eye					
Zoom	UWA	11-18	2.8																																	HD DA* 11-18 f/2.8 ED DC AW						
Zoom	UWA	12-24	4.0																			DA 12-24mm f/4 ED AL																				
Zoom	UWA	15-30	2.8																														D FA 15-30mm f/2.8 ED SDM WR									
Zoom	UWA	20-35	4.0												FA 20-40mm f/4 AL																											
Zoom	WA	16-45	4.0																	DA 16-45mm 4 ED AL																						
Zoom	WA	16-50	2.8																					DA* 16-50mm f/2.8 ED AL SDM														HD DA* 2.8 ED PLM AW				
Zoom	WA	16-85	3.5-5.6																												HD DA 16-85mm f/3.5-5.6 ED DC WR											
Zoom	WA	18-50	4-5.6																													HD DA 18-50 f/4-5.6 DC WR RE										
Zoom	WA	18-135	3.5-5.6																								DA 18-135mm f/3.5-5.6 ED AL DC WR															
Zoom	WA	20-40	2.8-4																												HD DA 20-40mm f/2.8-4 Limited DC WR											
Zoom	WA	24-50	4.0	F 24-50mm f/4																																						
Zoom	WA	24/28-70	2.8								FA* 28-70mm f/2.8 AL																						D FA 24-70mm f/2.8									
Zoom	Univ.	28-80	3.5-4.7					FA 28-80 f/3.5-4.7																																		
Zoom	Univ.	28-105	3.5/4-5.6						FA 28-105 f/4-5.6																									D FA 28-105 f/3.5-5.6 ED DC WR								
Zoom	Tele	50-135	2.8																					DA* 50-135mm f/2.8 ED SDM																		
Zoom	Tele	50-200	4-5.6																			DA 50-200mm f/4-5.6 ED				DA 50-200mm f/4-5.8 ED WR																
Zoom	Tele	55-300	4-5.8																						DA 55-300mm f/4-5.8 ED					DA 55-300mm f/4-5.8 ED WR												
Zoom	Tele	55-300	4.5-6.3																														HD DA 55-300mm f/4.5-6.3 ED PLM WR RE									
Zoom	Tele	60-250	4.0																						DA* 60-250mm f/4 ED SDM																	
Zoom	Tele	70/80-2x0	2.8								FA* 80-200mm f/2.8 ED																						HD D FA* 70-200mm f/2.8 ED DC AW									
Zoom	Tele	70/80-2x0	4.0																																		HD D FA 70-210 4 ED SDM WR					
Zoom	Tele	70/80-2x0	4-5.6	F 70-210mm f/4-5.6							FA 70-200mm f/4-5.6 ED																															
Zoom	Tele	100-300	4.5-5.6						FA 100-300mm f/4.5-5.6																																	
Zoom	Tele	150-450	4.5-5.6																														D FA 150-450mm f/4.5-5.6 ED DC AW									
Zoom	Tele	250-600	5.6		F* 250-600 ED			FA* 250-600 f/5.6 ED																																		
Teleconverter				F 1.7X AF																											HD DA 1.4X AW											
Kind	Type	Focal length	Aperture	87	88	89	1990	91	92	93	94	95	96	97	98	99	2000	01	02	03	04	05	06	07	08	09	2010	11	12	13	14	15	16	17	18	19	2020	21	22	23	24	25

Class	1970s										1980s										1990s										2000s									
Class	0	1	2	3	4	5	6	7	8	9	0	1	2	3	4	5	6	7	8	9	0	1	2	3	4	5	6	7	8	9	0	1	2	3	4	5	6	7	8	9
Flagship																						PZ-1 (Z-1)			PZ-1p (Z-1p)							MZ-S								
Flagship																									PZ-5p (Z-5p)															
Flagship											LX																													
Flagship							MX																																	
Flagship						K2 DMD																																		
Flagship						K2																																		
Midrange																		SFX (SF-1)			SFXn (SF-1n)							MZ-3 (ZX-3)				MZ-6 (ZX-L, MZ-L)								
Midrange																	P5 (P50)									MZ-5 (ZX-5)		MZ-5n (ZX-5n)												
Midrange														Super-A (Super Program)										PZ-20p (Z-20p)						MZ-7 (ZX-7)										
Midrange														Program-A (Program Plus)										Z-50p				MZ-50 (ZX-50)			MZ-30 (ZX-30)		MZ-60 (ZX-60)							
Midrange						KX						ME F														PZ-70p (Z-70p)														
Midrange							ME			ME Super																														
Entry-level																			SF7 (SF10)								MZ-10 (ZX-10)							*ist						
Entry-level																							PZ-20 (Z-20)			PZ-70 (Z-70)														
Entry-level																						PZ-10 (Z-10)																		
Entry-level																P3 (P30)			P3n (P30n)		P3t (P30t)								MZ-M (ZX-M)											
Entry-level						KM				MV	MV 1		MG			A3 (A3000)																								
Entry-level							K1000																																	
