= Miranda Camera Company =

Japanese photography company

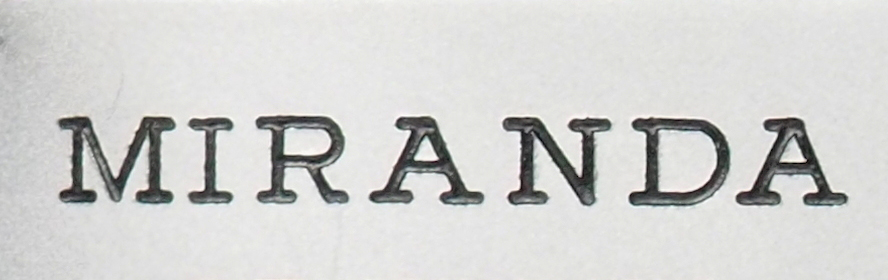
- Miranda logo
- Native name: ミランダカメラ㈱
- Romanized name: Miranda Camera K.K.
- Type: Kabushiki Kaisha
- Industry: Photography, imaging
- Predecessor: Orion Camera K.K. and, previously, Orion Seiki Sangyō Y.K.
- Founded: 1955; 71 years ago in Tokyo, Japan
- Founder: Ogihara Akira, Ōtsuka Shintarō
- Defunct: December 1976
- Products: Cameras and photographic equipment
- Parent: Allied Impex Corporation

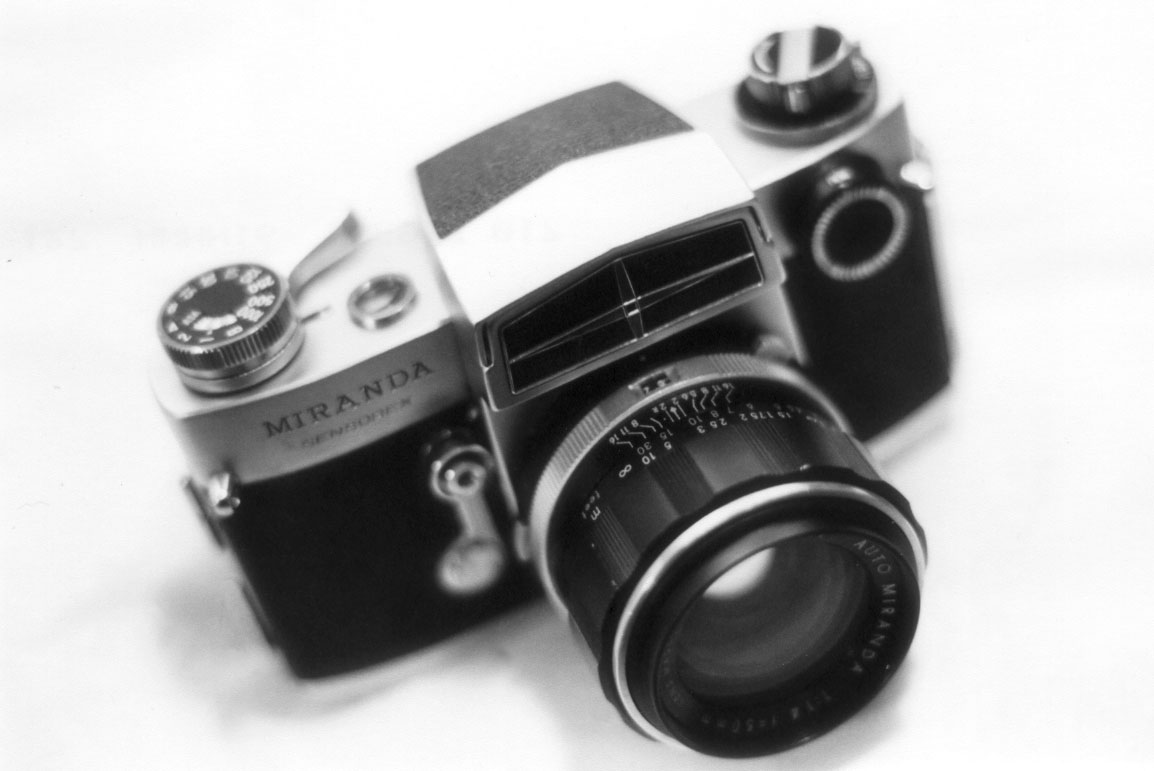
Miranda Sensorex which featured interchangeable prisms

The Miranda Camera Company (ミランダカメラ㈱), originally named the Orion Camera K.K. (オリオンカメラ㈱) in 1955 and Orion Seiki Sangyō Y.K. (オリオン精機産業有限会社) in 1947, manufactured cameras in Japan between 1955 (71 years ago) and 1976 (50 years ago). Their first camera was the Miranda T. Many of their products were single-lens reflex cameras for 135 film (35 mm). Unlike many Japanese made cameras, Miranda did not make their own lenses and had to rely on other manufacturers to supply them.

Miranda produced a line of quality 35mm still cameras; a range of over 30 models between first prototypes in 1953 through to the last production model in 1976. Many had advanced or sophisticated features for their day. Almost all Miranda SLR's shared the same basic lens mount, but the mount complexity increased over the years to accommodate more aperture and metering controls.

All of their SLR cameras, except the dx-3, had interchangeable pentaprisms (released by moving a button or twisting the base of the film rewind knob), and a unique dual lens mount; an external bayonet mount or a 44mm thread mount within the mirror box.

Unable to keep up with the increasing manufacturing automation of the larger manufacturers, and the increasingly sophisticated electronics of competing cameras, Miranda ceased production on December 10, 1976.

== Later use of brand by Dixons ==
In the early 1980s, the British electrical and photographic retailer Dixons acquired the rights to the Miranda brand and used it on a range of photographic equipment. This included badge-engineered versions of Cosina cameras which were distributed in several European countries.

As of May 2011, Dixons Retail (later merged into Dixons Carphone which in turn became today's Currys plc) still had the rights to the brand in several countries but no longer used it and planned to sell the brand off.
