= CinemaDNG =

File format for digital cinema

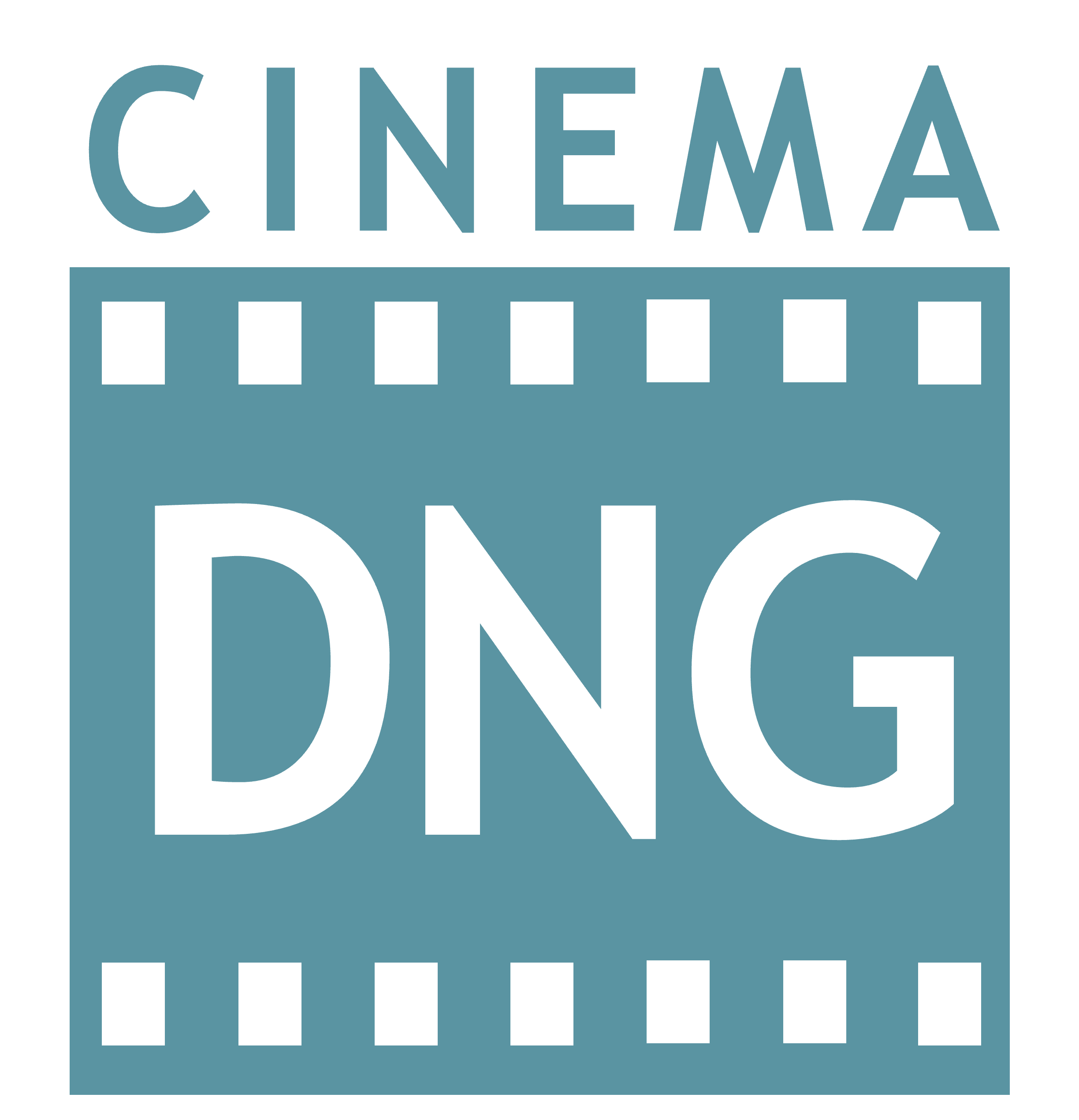
A high quality recreation of the blue version of the Cinema DNG logo

CinemaDNG is the result of an Adobe-led initiative to define an industry-wide open file format for digital cinema files. CinemaDNG caters for sets of movie clips, each of which is a sequence of raw video images, accompanied by audio and metadata. CinemaDNG supports stereoscopic cameras and multiple audio channels. CinemaDNG specifies directory structures containing one or more video clips, and specifies requirements and constraints for the open format files, (DNG, TIFF, XMP, and/or MXF), within those directories, that contain the content of those clips.

CinemaDNG is different from the Adobe DNG (Digital Negative) format that is primarily used as a raw image format for still cameras. However, each CinemaDNG image is encoded using that DNG image format. The image stream can then be stored in one of two formats: either as video essence using frame-based wrapping in an MXF file, or as a sequence of DNG image files in a specified file directory. Each clip uses just one of these formats, but the set of clips in a movie may use both.

== Timeline ==
- March 7, 2008: The domain name cinemadng.org was registered by Adobe.
- April 14, 2008: Adobe issued the press release that announced CinemaDNG.
- April 2009 onwards: Various companies began to announce plans or even products to support CinemaDNG (see "Signs of progress").
- September 10, 2009: Adobe Labs made available pre-release versions of specifications and products for handling CinemaDNG (see "Tangible deliverables").
- November 20, 2009: Adobe Labs provided a "CinemaDNG Refresh" - primarily extra (longer) samples.
- September 25, 2012: Adobe Labs drops support for CinemaDNG for Premiere Pro, stating that performance was not satisfactory.
- 2014: Support for CinemaDNG was expanded in Premiere Pro CC.

== Signs of progress ==
CinemaDNG has become an accepted file format in its brief history:

- IRIDAS (April 2009): (IRIDAS Supports CinemaDNG RAW Standard): "IRIDAS ... today announced universal support for the emerging CinemaDNG standard in all of the 2009 versions of its products."
- Silicon Imaging (April 2009): (Silicon Imaging Oscar Filmmaking Digital Cinema Cameras go 3D): "The files can also be exported as a CinemaDNG sequences ... at a later time."
- Vision Research (May 2009): (in a forum): "Is a cinemaDNG support planned for the next Software release?" - "Phantom software already has support for save/convert a cine to DNG format. This is a good start to get a cinemaDNG."
- RadiantGrid (September 2009): (RadiantGrid Technologies Launches v5.0 of the RadiantGrid Platform at IBC 2009): "Important new features .... Native decoding of CinemaDNG ... from MXF Op-Atom and Op1a sources .... TrueGrid transcoding from ... CinemaDNG ... image sequences".
- Gamma & Density (September 2009): (3cP - Cinematographer's Color Correction Program): "Technical Highlights of 3cP: Support for the ... CinemaDNG image data format".
- Adobe (September 2009 and November 2009): Specification and prerelease products and other resources from Adobe Labs (see "Tangible deliverables").
- ViewPLUS (December 2009): "ViewPLUS introduced the Lumiere 4K x 2K digital camera system at the International Technical Exhibition on Imaging Technology and Equipment in Yokohama, Japan. The Lumiere camera system also includes Lumiere-REC, a software development kit (SDK) that allows users to record image data and output to movie industry-standard CinemaDNG RAW file format."
- Ikonoskop (April 2009): Ikonoskop announces an HD digital cinema camera that records in CinemaDNG.
- INDIECAM (March 2010): (Indiecam announce to show their latest prototype indieSHUTTLE at the NAB Show 2010.) All Indiecam products offer CinemaDNG capabilities.
- Digital Bolex (March 2012): Digital Bolex announces a 2k resolution digital cinema camera that records in CinemaDNG.
- Blackmagic Design (April 2011): Blackmagic Design announces support for CinemaDNG in DaVinci Resolve 8 and DaVinci Resolve Lite. Released in July 2011, DaVinci Resolve Lite is available for download at the BMD web site at no charge and offers the industry a standardized playback application for CinemaDNG files from all camera sources that can be used for camera development, on set or in the post production process.
- Blackmagic Design (April 2012): Blackmagic Design announces support for CinemaDNG in their 2.5k resolution digital cinema camera.
- Weisscam (April 2012): Weisscam announces a 2K resolution digital cinema camera that records in CinemaDNG and shoots up to 300 frames per second.
- Blackmagic Design (April 2013): Blackmagic Design announces support for CinemaDNG in their Pocket Cinema Camera and Production Camera 4K.
- Norpix (January 2013): Norpix announces support for CinemaDNG export (transcoding), with its StreamPix 5 DVR software, commonly used when recording video with Machine Vision Cameras.
- Convergent Design (2014): Convergent Design have included CinemaDNG recording for the Sony FS700 and FS7 cameras in their Odyssey 7Q video recorder.
- Blackmagic Design (April 2014): Blackmagic Design announces support for CinemaDNG in their Blackmagic URSA camera.
- Atomos (2015): Atomos announces CinemaDNG recording from selected cameras (Sony FS700, Arri Alexa, Aja CION) in their Shogun video recorder.
- slimRAW (April 2015): slimRAW lossless compressor for CinemaDNG raw video released. It converts uncompressed CinemaDNG to losslessly compressed CinemaDNG "for a substantial data size reduction with no image quality loss".
- DJI (March 2016): DJI Zenmuse X5R Aerial Camera System for Inspire 1 Pro UAV utilizes CinemaDNG sequences to record video content to a removable SSD drive.
- Fastvideo (August 2016): Fast CinemaDNG Processor software. All stages of CinemaDNG workflow are performed on NVIDIA GPU to get very fast RAW image processing, including Blackmagic CinemaDNG files. 4K footage could be processed and played smoothly at full resolution (without proxies) in realtime. CinemaDNG Player, Converter, Editor, Denoiser, Compressor and Trimmer on CUDA.
- Sigma (July 2019): Sigma announces the Sigma fp - the "world's smallest and lightest full-frame mirrorless digital camera" with 8-, 10- and 12-bit CinemaDNG recording.
- Octopus Cinema (February 2024): Octopus Cinema announces the OCTOPUS16 camera with 4K CinemaDNG internal recording.
- Lasergraphics motion picture film scanning systems include support for output to CinemaDNG.

== Tangible deliverables ==
All of these are free and freely available; however, at November 2009 the products are prerelease versions:

- Adobe CinemaDNG Importer prerelease1 adds support to Adobe After Effects CS4, Adobe Premiere Pro CS4, and Adobe Soundbooth CS4 for reading CinemaDNG video streams in the form of MXF files and DNG file sequences. (Mac OS and Windows).
- "CinemaDNG - Image Data Format Specification (Version 1.0.0.0)" (PDF)
- "CinemaDNG Workflow - Using the CinemaDNG File Format in Cinema Workflows" (PDF)
- "CinemaDNG sample files" (directory structures in ZIP containing clips, icons, and images in both MXF and DNG-sequence forms). These are available as short samples (8 frames) and long samples (100 frames)
- A new Adobe Labs forum specifically for CinemaDNG.

== Standardization ==
There does not appear to be any commitment from Adobe (or any other company) to submit CinemaDNG to a standards body such as ISO. However, they have repeatedly emphasized that it will be an open format, and Adobe has stated "CinemaDNG uses fully-documented, vendor-neutral, standard formats for video and imaging – DNG, TIFF/EP, and MXF. The format is unencrypted and free from intellectual property encumbrances or license requirements". It is reasonable to speculate that eventually CinemaDNG will become a formal standard, based on the history of DNG itself which has been submitted to ISO for use in the revision of ISO 12234-2 (TIFF/EP).

Rather than creating entirely new file formats, the strategy for CinemaDNG is primarily to specify how to package files and other data-sets, of existing open and/or standard formats, in consistent ways, so that not only can individual components of a movie be interchanged and archived, but so can sets of clips with all their associated video, audio, and metadata files. The emphasis is on having a systematic structure that supports the very complicated workflows, involving many stages and suppliers and software and hardware components, of movie development. The CinemaDNG specification is largely about this systematic directory structure and the requirements and constraints that ensure that individual files fit within it.

If CinemaDNG follows the same sort of path to standardization as DNG, (or indeed, PDF), there will first be a period while the specification is tested in the marketplace to ensure that it works in practise as well as theory. It will then be revised accordingly, so that whatever is standardized will be credible, well supported by products, and ready for immediate use.

In November 2014 Blackmagic Design introduced an extension to the CinemaDNG format in the form of a lossy compression scheme used in their URSA cameras. This format uses a 12-bit Huffman Coding by patching jpeg-9a for 12-bit support. These CinemaDNG files are supported by Blackmagic Design's own DaVinci Resolve software, slimRAW and Fast CinemaDNG Processor.

The adoption of compressed CinemaDNG among camera manufacturers appears to be hindered by Red Digital Camera’s patent US9245314, which covers in-camera recording of compressed raw video. There had been an unsuccessful attempt to invalidate the patent.

== See also ==
- Digital Negative (DNG)
