= Megavision =

Megavision may refer to:

- MegaVision, an American manufacturer of imaging systems
- Megavisión El Salvador, a Salvadoran broadcasting company
- MEGA (Chilean TV channel) or Red Televisiva Megavisión
