= Pentax 645Z =

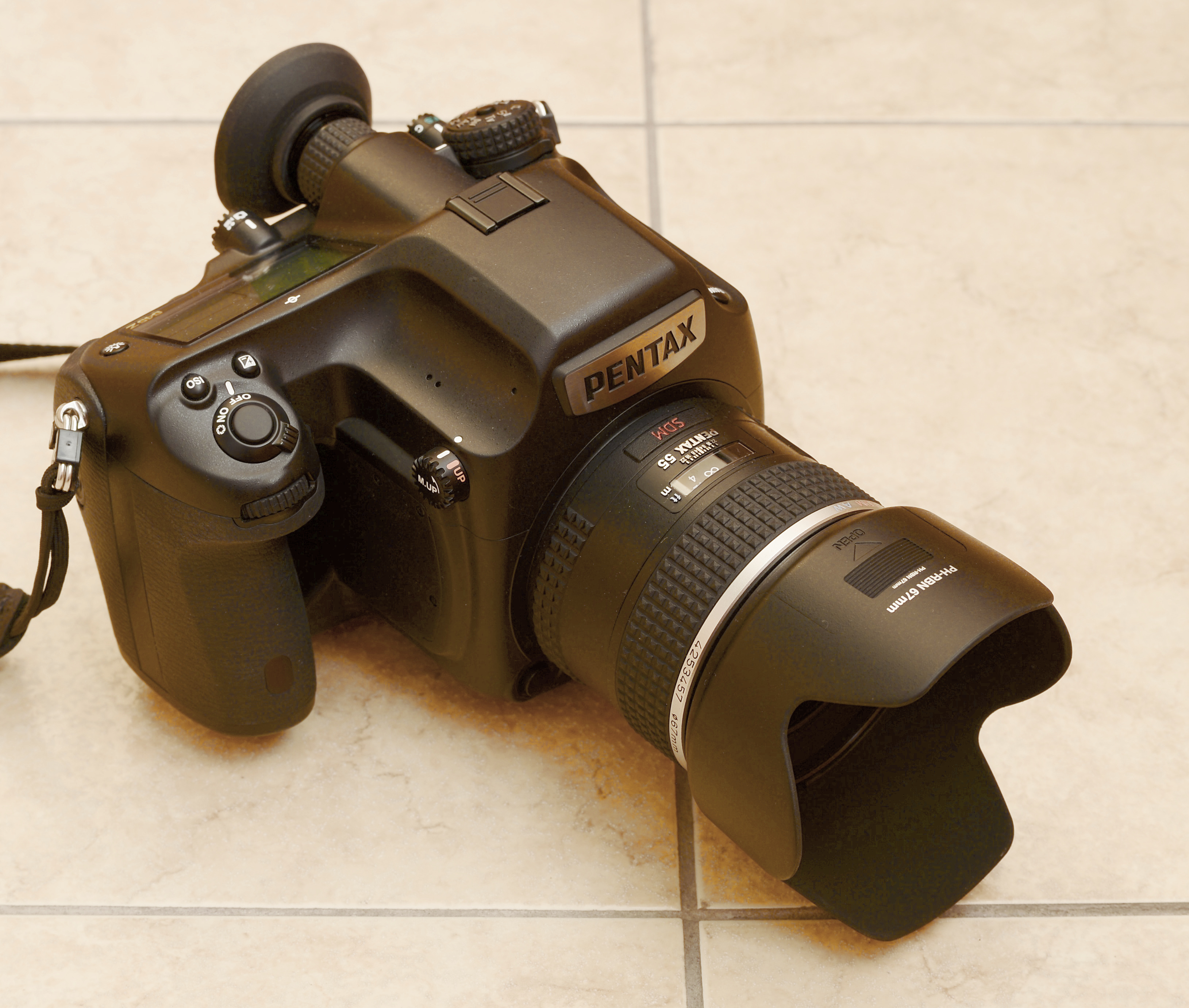

Overview
- Maker: Pentax

Lens
- Lens mount: Pentax 645

Sensor/medium
- Sensor type: CMOS
- Sensor size: 44 x 33mm (Medium format type)
- Maximum resolution: 8256 x 6192 (51 megapixels)
- Film speed: 100-204800
- Recording medium: Dual SD/SDHC/SDXC slots

Focusing
- Focus areas: 27 focus points

Shutter
- Shutter speeds: 1/4000s to 30s
- Continuous shooting: 3 frames per second

Viewfinder
- Viewfinder magnification: 0.62
- Frame coverage: 98%

Image processing
- Image processor: PRIME III
- White balance: Yes

General
- LCD screen: 3.2 inches with 1,037,000 dots
- Dimensions: 156 x 117 x 123mm (6.14 x 4.61 x 4.84 inches)
- Weight: 1,550 g (55 oz) including battery

The Pentax 645Z is a professional medium format digital SLR camera announced by Ricoh on April 15, 2014. While it shares its sensor with the Phase One IQ250 and Hasselblad H5Dc, it retails at less than a third of the price of these (~8500 at ~27000 USD). In 2015, the 645Z won the TIPA Award for the Best Medium Format Camera.

The most notable improvements over its predecessor, the Pentax 645D, include much lower noise at high ISO, the ability to record video (FullHD at 30 frames per second), and a tilting rear display.

It has a 27-point phase-detect autofocus system, all clustered near center of frame, and a weather sealed body. Its peak dynamic range is 14.8 EV at base ISO, compared to 12.6 EV on its 645D predecessor.

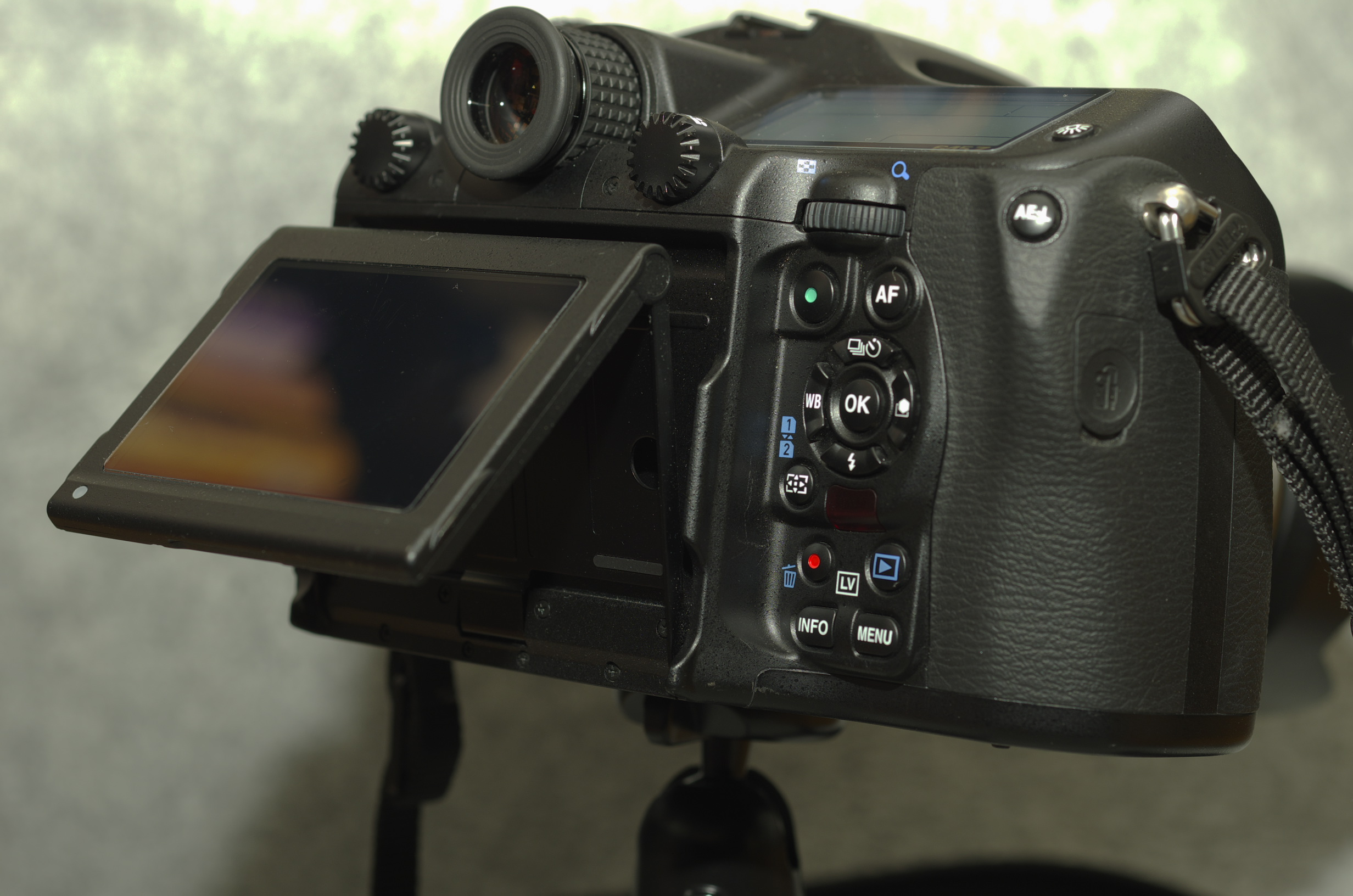
Pentax 645Z tiltable LCD

Furthermore, the 645Z is compatible with the Pentax FluCard to allow wireless "tethered" operation.

== Cutaway view ==
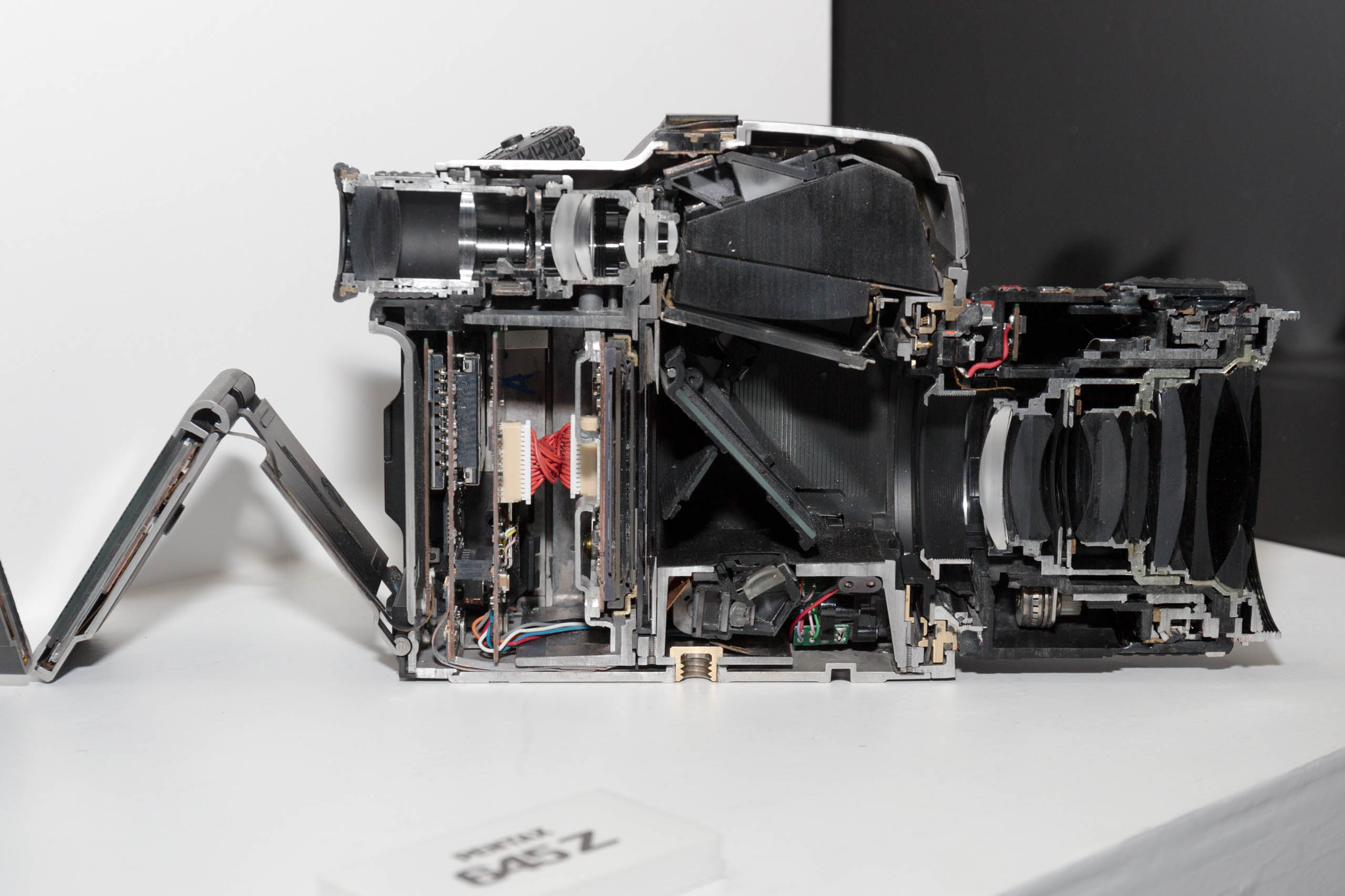
Cutaway view of the Pentax 645Z

Type	Sensor	Class	2003	2004	2005	2006		2007	2008	2009	2010	2011	2012	2013	2014	2015	2016	2017	2018	2019	2020	2021	2022	2023	2024	2025
DSLR	MF	Professional										645D				645Z										
DSLR	FF	Professional																K-1		K-1 II						
DSLR	APS-C	High-end															K-3 II						K-3 III			
DSLR	APS-C	High-end													K-3											
DSLR	APS-C	Advanced									K-7	K-5		K-5 II / K-5 IIs												
DSLR	APS-C	Advanced		*ist D			K10D		K20D									KP								
DSLR	APS-C	Midrange					K100D	100DS	K200D					K-30	K-50			K-70						KF		
DSLR	APS-C	Entry-level			*ist DS	*ist DS2						K-r			K-500	K-S2										
DSLR	APS-C	Entry-level			*ist DL	DL2	K110D			K-m/K2000	K-x					K-S1										
MILC	APS-C	K-mount											K-01													
MILC	1/1.7"	Q-mount													Q7											
MILC	1/1.7"	Q-mount														Q-S1										
MILC	1/2.3"	Q-mount											Q	Q10												
DSLR	Prototypes		MZ-D (2000); 645D Prototype (2006); AP 50th Anniv. (2007)																							
Type	Sensor	Class																								
Type	Sensor	Class	2003	2004	2005	2006		2007	2008	2009	2010	2011	2012	2013	2014	2015	2016	2017	2018	2019	2020	2021	2022	2023	2024	2025
