= TIFF =

Series of image file formats

- Gartoon of TIFF
- Filename extensions: .tiff, .tif
- Internet media type: image/tiff; image/tiff-fx
- Type code: TIFF
- Uniform Type Identifier (UTI): public.tiff
- Magic number: 49 49 2A 00 or 4D 4D 00 2A
- Developed by: Aldus Corporation, now Adobe Inc.
- Initial release: 12 September 1986; 40 years ago
- Latest release: TIFF 6.0; 3 June 1992; 34 years ago TIFF Supplement 2 / 22 March 2002; 24 years ago
- Type of format: Image file format
- Extended from: tiff
- Extended to: Exif, DCF, TIFF/EP, TIFF/IT, TIFF-FX, GeoTIFF
- Website: www.loc.gov/preservation/digital/formats/fdd/fdd000022.shtml

Tag Image File Format or Tagged Image File Format, commonly known by the abbreviations TIFF or TIF, is an image file format for storing raster graphics images, popular among graphic artists, the publishing industry, and photographers. TIFF is widely supported by scanning, faxing, word processing, optical character recognition, image manipulation, desktop publishing, and page-layout applications.

The format was created by Stephen Carlsen, an engineer at Aldus Corporation, for use in desktop publishing. It published the latest version 6.0 in 1992, subsequently updated with an Adobe Systems copyright after the latter acquired Aldus in 1994. Several Aldus or Adobe technical notes have been published with minor extensions to the format, and several specifications have been based on TIFF 6.0, including TIFF/EP (ISO 12234-2), TIFF/IT (ISO 12639), TIFF-F (RFC 2306) and TIFF-FX (RFC 3949).

== History ==
TIFF was created as an attempt to get desktop scanner vendors of the mid-1980s to agree on a common scanned image file format, in place of a multitude of proprietary formats. Carlsen's three objectives were:

1. Implement import and printing of "basic" bitmapped images, like MacPaint files.
2. Implement import and printing of higher-resolution images, coming from scanners.
3. Define and promote an industry standard for storing and processing scanned images, so that Aldus would not have to write import filters for every model of every scanner entering the budding desktop scanner market.

In the beginning, TIFF was only a binary image format (only two possible values for each pixel), because that was all that desktop scanners could handle. As scanners became more powerful, and as desktop computer disk space became more plentiful, TIFF grew to accommodate grayscale images, then color images. Today, TIFF, along with JPEG and PNG, is a popular format for deep-color images.

The first version of the TIFF specification was published by the Aldus Corporation in the autumn of 1986 after two major earlier draft releases. It can be labeled as Revision 3.0. It was published after a series of meetings with various scanner manufacturers and software developers. In April 1987 Revision 4.0 was released and it contained mostly minor enhancements. In October 1988 Revision 5.0 was released and it added support for palette color images and LZW compression.

TIFF is a complex format, defining many tags of which typically only a few are used in each file. This led to implementations supporting many varying subsets of the format, a situation that gave rise to the joke that TIFF stands for Thousands of Incompatible File Formats. This problem was addressed in revision 6.0 of the TIFF specification (June 1992) by introducing a distinction between Baseline TIFF (which all implementations were required to support) and TIFF Extensions (which are optional). Additional extensions are defined in two supplements to the specification which were published in September 1995 and March 2002 respectively.

== Overview ==
A TIFF file contains one or several images, termed subfiles in the specification. The basic use case for having multiple subfiles is to encode a multipage telefax in a single file, but it is also allowed to have different subfiles be different variants of the same image, for example scanned at different resolutions. Rather than being a continuous range of bytes in the file, each subfile is a data structure whose top-level entity is called an image file directory (IFD). Baseline TIFF readers are only required to make use of the first subfile, but each IFD has a field for linking to a next IFD.

The IFDs are where the tags for which TIFF is named are located. Each IFD contains one or several entries, each of which is identified by its tag. The tags are arbitrary 16-bit numbers; their symbolic names such as ImageWidth often used in discussions of TIFF data do not appear explicitly in the file itself. Each IFD entry has an associated value, which may be decoded based on general rules of the format, but it depends on the tag what that value then means. There may within a single IFD be no more than one entry with any particular tag. Some tags are for linking to the actual image data, other tags specify how the image data should be interpreted, and still other tags are used for image metadata.

TIFF images are made up of rectangular grids of pixels. The two axes of this geometry are termed horizontal (or X, or width) and vertical (or Y, or length). Horizontal and vertical resolution need not be equal (since in a telefax they typically would not be equal). A baseline TIFF image divides the vertical range of the image into one or several strips, which are encoded (in particular: compressed) separately. Historically this served to facilitate TIFF readers (such as fax machines) with limited capacity to store uncompressed data — one strip would be decoded and then immediately printed — but the present specification motivates it by "increased editing flexibility and efficient I/O buffering". A TIFF extension provides the alternative of tiled images, in which case both the horizontal and the vertical ranges of the image are decomposed into smaller units.

An example of these things, which also serves to give a flavor of how tags are used in the TIFF encoding of images, is that a striped TIFF image would use tags 273 (StripOffsets), 278 (RowsPerStrip), and 279 (StripByteCounts). The StripOffsets point to the blocks of image data, the StripByteCounts say how long each of these blocks are (as stored in the file), and RowsPerStrip says how many rows of pixels there are in a strip; the latter is required even in the case of having just one strip, in which case it merely duplicates the value of tag 257 (ImageLength). A tiled TIFF image instead uses tags 322 (TileWidth), 323 (TileLength), 324 (TileOffsets), and 325 (TileByteCounts). The pixels within each strip or tile appear in row-major order, left to right and top to bottom.

The data for one pixel is made up of one or several samples; for example an RGB image would have one Red sample, one Green sample, and one Blue sample per pixel, whereas a greyscale or palette color image only has one sample per pixel. TIFF allows for both additive (e.g. RGB, RGBA) and subtractive (e.g. CMYK) color models. TIFF does not constrain the number of samples per pixel (except that there must be enough samples for the chosen color model), nor does it constrain how many bits are encoded for each sample, but baseline TIFF only requires that readers support a few combinations of color model and bit-depth of images. Support for custom sets of samples is very useful for scientific applications; 3 samples per pixel is at the low end of multispectral imaging, and hyperspectral imaging may require hundreds of samples per pixel. TIFF supports having all samples for a pixel next to each other within a single strip/tile (PlanarConfiguration = 1) but also different samples in different strips/tiles (PlanarConfiguration = 2). The default format for a sample value is as an unsigned integer, but a TIFF extension allows declaring them as alternatively being signed integers or IEEE-754 floats, as well as specify a custom range for valid sample values.

TIFF images may be uncompressed, compressed using a lossless compression scheme, or compressed using a lossy compression scheme. The lossless LZW compression scheme has at times been regarded as the standard compression for TIFF, but this is technically a TIFF extension. Compression schemes vary significantly in at what level they process the data: LZW acts on the stream of bytes encoding a strip or tile (without regard to sample structure, bit depth, or row width), whereas the JPEG compression scheme both transforms the sample structure of pixels (switching to a different color model) and encodes pixels in 8×8 blocks rather than row by row.

Most data in TIFF files are numerical, but the format supports declaring data as rather being textual, if appropriate for a particular tag. Tags that take textual values include Artist, Copyright, DateTime, DocumentName, InkNames, and Model.

=== MIME type ===
The MIME type image/tiff (defined in RFC 3302) without an application parameter is used for Baseline TIFF 6.0 files or to indicate that it is not necessary to identify a specific subset of TIFF or TIFF extensions. The optional "application" parameter (Example: Content-type: image/tiff; application=foo) is defined for image/tiff to identify a particular subset of TIFF and TIFF extensions for the encoded image data, if it is known. According to RFC 3302, specific TIFF subsets or TIFF extensions used in the application parameter must be published as an RFC.

MIME type image/tiff-fx (defined in RFC 3949 and RFC 3950) is based on TIFF 6.0 with TIFF Technical Notes TTN1 (Trees) and TTN2 (Replacement TIFF/JPEG specification). It is used for Internet fax compatible with the ITU-T Recommendations for Group 3 black-and-white, grayscale and color fax.

=== Digital preservation ===
Adobe holds the copyright on the TIFF specification (aka TIFF 6.0) along with the two supplements that have been published. These documents can be found on the Adobe TIFF Resources page. The Fax standard in RFC 3949 is based on these TIFF specifications.

TIFF files that strictly use the basic "tag sets" as defined in TIFF 6.0 along with restricting the compression technology to the methods identified in TIFF 6.0 and are adequately tested and verified by multiple sources for all documents being created can be used for storing documents. Commonly seen issues encountered in the content and document management industry associated with the use of TIFF files arise when the structures contain proprietary headers, are not properly documented, or contain "wrappers" or other containers around the TIFF datasets, or include improper compression technologies, or those compression technologies are not properly implemented.

Variants of TIFF can be used within document imaging and content/document management systems using CCITT Group IV 2D compression which supports black-and-white (bitonal, monochrome) images, among other compression technologies that support color. When storage capacity and network bandwidth was a greater issue than commonly seen in today's server environments, high-volume storage scanning, documents were scanned in black and white (not in color or in grayscale) to conserve storage capacity.

The inclusion of the SampleFormat tag in TIFF 6.0 allows TIFF files to handle advanced pixel data types, including integer images with more than 8 bits per channel and floating point images. This tag made TIFF 6.0 a viable format for scientific image processing where extended precision is required. An example would be the use of TIFF to store images acquired using scientific CCD cameras that provide up to 16 bits per photosite of intensity resolution. Storing a sequence of images in a single TIFF file is also possible, and is allowed under TIFF 6.0, provided the rules for multi-page images are followed.

== Details ==
TIFF is a flexible, adaptable file format for handling images and data within a single file, by including the header tags (size, definition, image-data arrangement, applied image compression) defining the image's geometry. A TIFF file, for example, can be a container holding JPEG (lossy) and PackBits (lossless) compressed images. A TIFF file also can include a vector-based clipping path (outlines, croppings, image frames). The ability to store image data in a lossless format makes a TIFF file a useful image archive, because, unlike standard JPEG files, a TIFF file using lossless compression (or none) may be edited and re-saved without losing image quality. This is not the case when using the TIFF as a container holding compressed JPEG. Other TIFF options are layers and pages.

TIFF offers the option of using LZW compression, a lossless data-compression technique for reducing a file's size. Use of this option was limited by patents on the LZW technique until their expiration in 2004.

The TIFF 6.0 specification consists of the following parts:

- Introduction (contains information about TIFF Administration, usage of Private fields and values, etc.)
- Part 1: Baseline TIFF
- Part 2: TIFF Extensions
- Part 3: Appendices

=== Part 1: Baseline TIFF ===
When TIFF was introduced, its extensibility provoked compatibility problems. The flexibility in encoding gave rise to the joke that TIFF stands for Thousands of Incompatible File Formats. To avoid these problems, every TIFF reader was required to read Baseline TIFF. Among other things, Baseline TIFF does not include layers, or compressed JPEG or LZW images. Baseline TIFF is formally known as TIFF 6.0, Part 1: Baseline TIFF.

The following is an incomplete list of required Baseline TIFF features:

==== Multiple subfiles ====
TIFF readers must be prepared for multiple/multi-page images (subfiles) per TIFF file, although they are not required to actually do anything with images after the first one.

There may be more than one Image File Directory (IFD) in a TIFF file. Each IFD defines a subfile. One use of subfiles is to describe related images, such as the pages of a facsimile document. A Baseline TIFF reader is not required to read any IFD beyond the first one.

==== Strips ====
A baseline TIFF image is composed of one or more strips. A strip (or band) is a subsection of the image composed of one or more rows. Each strip may be compressed independently of the entire image, and each begins on a byte boundary. If the image height is not evenly divisible by the number of rows in the strip, the last strip may contain fewer rows. If strip definition tags are omitted, the image is assumed to contain a single strip.

==== Compression ====
Baseline TIFF readers must handle the following three compression schemes:

- Zero compression
- CCITT Group 3 1-Dimensional Modified Huffman RLE
- PackBits compression - a form of run-length encoding

==== Image types ====
Baseline TIFF image types are: bilevel, grayscale, palette-color, and RGB full-color images.

==== Byte order ====
Every TIFF file begins with a two-byte indicator of byte order: "II" for little-endian (a.k.a. "Intel byte ordering", c. 1980) or "MM" for big-endian (a.k.a. "Motorola byte ordering", c. 1980) byte ordering. The next two-byte word contains the format version number, which has always been 42 for every version of TIFF (e.g., TIFF v5.0 and TIFF v6.0). All two-byte words, double words, etc., in the TIFF file are assumed to be in the indicated byte order. The TIFF 6.0 specification states that compliant TIFF readers must support both byte orders ("II" and "MM"); writers may use either.

==== Other TIFF fields ====
TIFF readers must be prepared to encounter and ignore private fields not described in the TIFF specification. TIFF readers must not refuse to read a TIFF file if optional fields do not exist.

=== Part 2: TIFF Extensions ===
Many TIFF readers support tags additional to those in Baseline TIFF, but not every reader supports every extension. As a consequence, Baseline TIFF features became the lowest common denominator for TIFF. Baseline TIFF features are extended in TIFF Extensions (defined in the TIFF 6.0 Part 2 specification) but extensions can also be defined in private tags.

The TIFF Extensions are formally known as TIFF 6.0, Part 2: TIFF Extensions. Here are some examples of TIFF extensions defined in TIFF 6.0 specification:

==== Compression ====
- CCITT T.4 bi-level encoding
- CCITT T.6 bi-level encoding
- LZW
- JPEG

==== Image types ====
- CMYK Images
- YCbCr Images
- HalftoneHints
- Tiled Images
- CIE L*a*b* Images

==== Image trees ====
A baseline TIFF file can contain a sequence of images (IFD). Typically, all the images are related but represent different data, such as the pages of a document. In order to explicitly support multiple views of the same data, the SubIFD tag was introduced. This allows the images to be defined along a tree structure. Each image can have a sequence of children, each child being itself an image. The typical usage is to provide thumbnails or several versions of an image in different color spaces.

===== Tiles =====
A TIFF image may also be composed of a number of tiles. All tiles in the same image have the same dimensions and may be compressed independently of the entire image, similar to strips (see above). Tiled images are part of TIFF 6.0, Part 2: TIFF Extensions, so the support for tiled images is not required in Baseline TIFF readers.

==== Other extensions ====
According to TIFF 6.0 specification (Introduction), all TIFF files using proposed TIFF extensions that are not approved by Adobe as part of Baseline TIFF (typically for specialized uses of TIFF that do not fall within the domain of publishing or general graphics or picture interchange) should be either not called TIFF files or should be marked some way so that they will not be confused with mainstream TIFF files.

==== Private tags ====
Developers can apply for a block of "private tags" to enable them to include their own proprietary information inside a TIFF file without causing problems for file interchange. TIFF readers are required to ignore tags that they do not recognize, and a registered developer's private tags are guaranteed not to clash with anyone else's tags or with the standard set of tags defined in the specification. Private tags are numbered in the range 32,768 and higher.

Private tags are reserved for information meaningful only for some organization, or for experiments with a new compression scheme within TIFF. Upon request, the TIFF administrator (currently Adobe) will allocate and register one or more private tags for an organization, to avoid possible conflicts with other organizations. Organizations and developers are discouraged from choosing their own tag numbers arbitrarily, because doing so could cause serious compatibility problems. However, if there is little or no chance that TIFF files will escape a private environment, organizations and developers are encouraged to consider using TIFF tags in the "reusable" 65,000–65,535 range. There is no need to contact Adobe when using numbers in this range.

=== TIFF Compression Tag ===
The TIFF Tag 259 (0103_{16}) stores the information about the Compression method. The default value is 1 = no compression.

Most TIFF writers and TIFF readers support only some TIFF compression schemes. Here are some examples of used TIFF compression schemes:

TIFF Compression Tag
Tag value	Compression scheme	Lossy/lossless	Specification	Description	Image types	Usage and support
0001_{16}	None	Lossless	TIFF 6.0	Baseline TIFF	All	Common
0002_{16}	CCITT Group 3 1-Dimensional Modified Huffman run-length encoding (a.k.a. MH or CCITT 1D)	Lossless	TIFF 6.0	Baseline TIFF; compression based on ITU-T T.4	Black and white	Common
0003_{16}	CCITT T.4 bi-level encoding as specified in section 4, Coding, of ITU-T Recommendation T.4 (a.k.a. CCITT Group 3 fax encoding or CCITT Group 3 2D)	Lossless	TIFF 6.0	TIFF 6.0 Extensions; compression based on ITU-T T.4	Black and white	Common
0004_{16}	CCITT T.6 bi-level encoding as specified in section 2 of ITU-T Recommendation T.6 (a.k.a. CCITT Group 4 fax encoding)	Lossless	TIFF 6.0	TIFF 6.0 extensions; compression based on ITU-T T.6	Black and white	Common
0005_{16}	Lempel–Ziv–Welch	Lossless	TIFF 6.0	TIFF 6.0 Extensions; first defined in TIFF 5 (1988); a patented compression algorithm, but the patents expired in 2003 and 2004	All	Common
0006_{16}	JPEG (obsolete 'old-style' JPEG, later superseded in Technote2)	Lossy	TIFF 6.0	TIFF 6.0 Extensions; first defined in TIFF 6 (1992); obsolete, should never be written.	Continuous-tone	Rare
0007_{16}	JPEG ('new-style' JPEG)	Lossy	TIFF 6 Technote2 (1995)	supersedes old-style JPEG compression; it is a TIFF 6.0 extension.	Continuous-tone	Uncommon
0008_{16}	Deflate (zlib), Adobe variant (official)	Lossless	TIFF Specification Supplement 2 (2002)	RFC 1950 (1996), RFC 1951 (1996), Adobe Photoshop TIFF Technical Notes; it is a TIFF 6.0 extension.	All	Common
0009_{16}	JBIG, per ITU-T T.85	Lossless	TIFF-FX	RFC 2301 (1998), RFC 3949 (2005)	Black and white	Rare
000A_{16}	JBIG, per ITU-T T.43	Lossless	TIFF-FX	RFC 2301 (1998), RFC 3949 (2005)	Black and white	Rare
7FFE_{16}	NeXT RLE 2-bit greyscale encoding		Proprietary			Rare
8005_{16}	PackBits (a.k.a. Macintosh RLE)	Lossless	TIFF 6.0	Baseline TIFF	All	Rare
8029_{16}	ThunderScan RLE 4-bit encoding		Proprietary		Black and white	Rare
807F_{16}	RasterPadding in continuous tone (CT) or monochrome picture (MP)	Lossless	TIFF/IT (1998, 2004)	ISO 12639		Rare
8080_{16}	RLE for line work (LW)	Lossless	TIFF/IT (1998, 2004)	ISO 12639		Rare
8081_{16}	RLE for high-resolution continuous-tone (HC)	Lossless	TIFF/IT (1998, 2004)	ISO 12639		Rare
8082_{16}	RLE for binary line work (BL)	Lossless	TIFF/IT (1998, 2004)	ISO 12639		Rare
80B2_{16}	Deflate, PKZIP variant (obsolete)	Lossless	Proprietary	According to TIFF Specification Supplement 2 it should be considered obsolete but reading is recommended	All	Uncommon
80B3_{16}	Kodak DCS		Proprietary			Rare
8765_{16}	JBIG		LibTIFF		Black and white	Rare
8798_{16}	JPEG2000		Proprietary	Includes a complete JP2 file inside a TIFF file, not recommended. Introduced by Leadtools.		Uncommon
8799_{16}	Nikon NEF Compressed		Proprietary			Rare
879B_{16}	JBIG2	Lossless, lossy	TIFF-FX Extension Set 1.0	Abandoned IETF draft from 2001		Rare
8847_{16}	LERC	Lossy	ESRI LERC			Rare
884C_{16}	Lossy non-YCbCr JPEG	Lossy	DNG 1.4.0.0	Used for DNG semantic masks and for images in the LinearRaw colorspace; explicitly indicates baseline DCT JPEG compression as opposed to "lossless Huffman JPEG".		Rare
C350_{16}	ZSTD	Lossless	LibTIFF			Rare
C351_{16}	WebP	Lossless, lossy	LibTIFF			Rare
CD42_{16}	JPEG XL	Lossless, lossy	DNG 1.7.0.0			Rare

== Related formats ==
=== BigTIFF ===
The TIFF file formats use 32-bit offsets, which limits file size to around 4 GiB. Some implementations even use a signed 32-bit offset, running into issues around 2 GiB. BigTIFF is a TIFF variant file format which uses 64-bit offsets and supports much larger files (up to 18 exabytes in size). The BigTIFF file format specification was implemented in 2007 in development releases of LibTIFF version 4.0, which was finally released as stable in December 2011. Support for BigTIFF file formats by applications is limited. The file name extension is often tif, but may be tiff, gtiff, btf or tf8.

=== Exif ===
The Exif specification builds upon TIFF. For uncompressed image data, an Exif file is straight off a TIFF file with some private tags. For JPEG compressed image data, Exif uses the JPEG File Interchange Format but embeds a TIFF file in the APP1 segment of the file. The first IFD (termed 0th in the Exif specification) of that embedded TIFF does not contain image data, and only houses metadata for the primary image. There may however be a thumbnail image in that embedded TIFF, which is provided by the second IFD (termed 1st in the Exif specification). The Exif audio file format does not build upon TIFF.

Exif defines a large number of private tags for image metadata, particularly camera settings and geopositioning data, but most of those do not appear in the ordinary TIFF IFDs. Instead these reside in separate IFDs which are pointed at by private tags in the main IFD.

=== TIFF/IT ===
TIFF/IT
- Filename extension: .fp, .ct, .lw, .hc, .mp, .bp, .bl, .sd
- Internet media type: not defined
- Developed by: ANSI, ISO
- Initial release: 1993
- Latest release: TIFF/IT; 2004; 22 years ago
- Type of format: Image file format
- Extended from: TIFF 6.0
- Standard: ISO 12639

TIFF/IT is used to send data for print-ready pages that have been designed on high-end prepress systems. The TIFF/IT specification (ISO 12639) describes a multiple-file format, which can describe a single page per file set. TIFF/IT files are not interchangeable with common TIFF files.

The goals in developing TIFF/IT were to carry forward the original IT8 magnetic-tape formats into a medium-independent version. TIFF/IT is based on Adobe TIFF 6.0 specification and both extends TIFF 6, by adding additional tags, and restricts, it by limiting some tags and the values within tags. Not all valid TIFF/IT images are valid TIFF 6.0 images.

TIFF/IT defines image-file formats for encoding color continuous-tone picture images, color line art images, high-resolution continuous-tone images, monochrome continuous-tone images, binary picture images, binary line-art images, screened data, and images of composite final pages.

There is no MIME type defined for TIFF/IT. The MIME type image/tiff should not be used for TIFF/IT files, because TIFF/IT does not conform to Baseline TIFF 6.0 and the widely deployed TIFF 6.0 readers cannot read TIFF/IT. The MIME type image/tiff (defined in RFC 3302) without an application parameter is used for Baseline TIFF 6.0 files or to indicate that it is not necessary to identify a specific subset of TIFF or TIFF extensions. The application parameter should be used with image/tiff to distinguish TIFF extensions or TIFF subsets. According to RFC 3302, specific TIFF subsets or TIFF extensions must be published as an RFC. There is no such RFC for TIFF/IT. There is also no plan by the ISO committee that oversees TIFF/IT standard to register TIFF/IT with either a parameter to image/tiff or as new separate MIME type.

==== TIFF/IT files ====
TIFF/IT consists of a number of different files and it cannot be created or opened by common desktop applications. TIFF/IT-P1 file sets usually consist of the following files:

- Final Page (FP)
- Continuous Tone image (CT)
- Line Work image (LW)
- High resolution Continuous-tone files (HC - optional)

TIFF/IT also defines the following files:

- Monochrome continuous-tone Picture images (MP)
- Binary Picture images (BP)
- Binary Line-art images (BL)
- Screened Data (SD)

Some of these data types are partly compatible with the corresponding definitions in the TIFF 6.0 specification. The Final Page (FP) allows the various files needed to define a complete page to be grouped together: it provides a mechanism for creating a package that includes separate image layers (of types CT, LW, etc.) to be combined to create the final printed image. Its use is recommended but not required. There must be at least one subfile in an FP file, but no more than one of each type. It typically contains a CT subfile and an LW subfile.

The primary color space for this standard is CMYK, but also other color spaces and the use of ICC Profiles are supported.

==== TIFF/IT compression ====
TIFF/IT makes no provision for compression within the file structure itself, but there are no restrictions. (For example, it is allowed to compress the whole file structure in a ZIP archive.)

LW files use a specific compression scheme known as Run-length encoding for LW (Compression tag value is 8080_{16}). HC files also use a specific Run-length encoding for HC (Compression tag value is 8081_{16}). The TIFF/IT P1 specs do not allow use of compression within the CT file.

The following is a list of defined TIFF/IT compression schemes:

TIFF/IT compression schemes
File type	TIFF/IT conformance	TIFF/IT-P1 conformance	TIFF/IT-P2 conformance
Final Page (FP) 0th IFD field	Uncompressed (0001_{16}), Deflate (0008_{16}) or PackBits (8005_{16})		
Continuous Tone (CT)	Uncompressed (0001_{16}), JPEG (0007_{16}), Deflate (0008_{16}) or RasterPadding in CT or MP (807F_{16})	Uncompressed (0001_{16})	Uncompressed (0001_{16}), JPEG (0007_{16}), Deflate (0008_{16})
Line Work (LW)	RLE for LW (8080_{16})		
High resolution Continuous tone (HC)	RLE for HC (8081_{16})		
Monochrome continuous-tone Picture (MP)	Uncompressed (0001_{16}), JPEG (0007_{16}), Deflate (0008_{16}) or RasterPadding in CT or MP (807F_{16})	Uncompressed (0001_{16})	Uncompressed (0001_{16}), JPEG (0007_{16}), Deflate (0008_{16})
Binary Picture images (BP)	Uncompressed (0001_{16}), CCITT T.6 bi-level encoding (0004_{16}), Deflate (0008_{16})	Uncompressed (0001_{16})	Uncompressed (0001_{16}), CCITT T.6 bi-level encoding (0004_{16}), Deflate (0008_{16})
Binary Line art (BL)	RLE for BL (8082_{16})		
Screened Data (SD)	Uncompressed (0001_{16}), CCITT T.6 bi-level encoding (0004_{16}), Deflate (0008_{16})		Uncompressed (0001_{16}), CCITT T.6 bi-level encoding (0004_{16}), Deflate (0008_{16})

==== TIFF/IT P1 ====
The ISO 12639:1998 introduced TIFF/IT-P1 (Profile 1) - a direct subset of the full TIFF/IT standard (previously defined in ANSI IT8.8–1993). This subset was developed on the ground of the mutual realization by both the standards and the software development communities that an implementation of the full TIFF/IT standard by any one vendor was both unlikely (because of its complexity), and unnecessary (because Profile 1 would cover most applications for digital ad delivery). Almost all TIFF/IT files in digital advertising were distributed as TIFF/IT-P1 file sets in 2001. When people talk about TIFF/IT, they usually mean the P1 standard.

Here are some of the restrictions on TIFF/IT-P1 (compared to TIFF/IT):

- Uses CMYK only (when appropriate)
- It is pixel interleaved (when appropriate)
- Has a single choice of image orientation
- Has a single choice of dot range
- Restricted compression methods

TIFF/IT-P1 is a simplified conformance level of TIFF/IT and it maximizes the compatibility between Color Electronic Prepress Systems (CEPS) and Desk Top Publishing (DTP) worlds. It provides a clean interface for the proprietary CEPS formats such as the Scitex CT/LW format.

==== TIFF/IT P2 ====
Because TIFF/IT P1 had a number of limitations, an extended format was developed. The ISO 12639:2004 introduced a new extended conformance level - TIFF/IT-P2 (Profile 2). TIFF/IT-P2 added a number of functions to TIFF/IT-P1 like:

- CMYK spot colors only (when appropriate)
- Support for the compression of CT and BP data (JPEG and Deflate)
- Support for multiple LW and CT files in a single file
- Support for copydot files through a new file type called SD (Screened Data)
- There was some effort to create a possibility to concatenate FP, LW, and CT files into a single file called the GF (Group Final) file, but this was not defined in a draft version of ISO 12639:2004.

This format was not widely used.

==== Private tags ====
The TIFF/IT specification preserved the TIFF possibility for developers to utilize private tags. The TIFF/IT specification is very precise regarding how these private tags should be treated - they should be parsed, but ignored.

Private tags in the TIFF/IT-P1 specification were originally intended to provide developers with ways to add specific functionality for specific applications. Private tags can be used by developers (e.g., Scitex) to preserve specific printing values or other functionality. Private tags are typically labelled with tag numbers greater than or equal to 32768.

All private tags must be requested from Adobe (the TIFF administrator) and registered.

In 1992, the DDAP (Digital Distribution of Advertising for Publication, later Digital Directions in Applications for Production) developed their requirement statement for digital ad delivery. This was presented to ANSI-accredited CGATS (Committee for Graphic Arts Technology Standards) for development of an accredited file format standard for the delivery of digital ads. CGATS reviewed their alternatives for this purpose and TIFF seemed like the ideal candidate, except for the fact that it could not handle certain required functionalities. CGATS asked Aldus (the TIFF administrator) for a block of their own TIFF private tags in order to implement what eventually became TIFF/IT. For example, the ability to identify the sequence of the colors is handled by tag 34017 - the Color Sequence Tag.

TIFF/IT was created to satisfy the need for a transport-independent method of encoding raster data in the IT8.1, IT8.2 and IT8.5 standards.

==== Standards ====
TIFF/IT was defined in ANSI IT8.8–1993 standard in 1993 and later revised in the International Standard ISO 12639:1998 - Prepress digital data exchange – Tag image file format for image technology (TIFF/IT). The ISO standard replaces ANSI IT8.8–1993. It specifies a media-independent means for prepress electronic data exchange.

The ISO 12639:2004 (Second edition) standard for TIFF/IT superseded the ISO 12639:1998. It was also later extended in ISO 12639:2004 / Amd. 1:2007 - Use of JBIG2-Amd2 compression in TIFF/IT.

== See also ==
- Comparison of graphics file formats
- LibTIFF, widely used open source library + utilities for reading/writing/manipulating TIFF files
- DNG
- GeoTIFF
- Image file formats
- STDU Viewer
- Windows Photo Viewer
- T.37 (ITU-T recommendation)
