= Pentax KP =

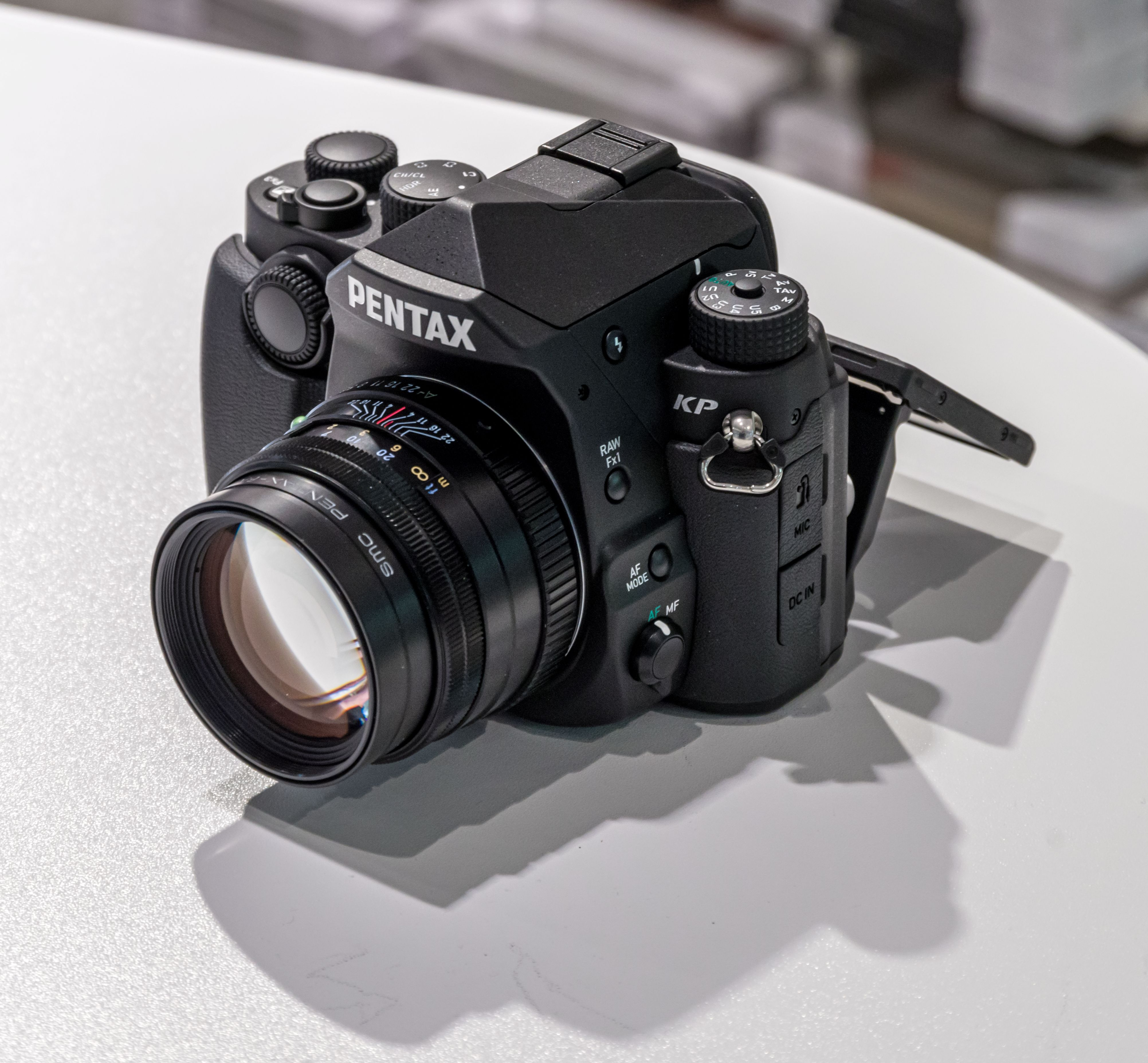

Overview
- Maker: Ricoh
- Type: Digital single-lens reflex camera
- Released: January 2017

Lens
- Lens mount: Pentax K_{AF3} and K_{AF2} mount compatible with Pentax auto-aperture lenses; older lenses supported in stop-down metering mode
- Lens: Interchangeable

Sensor/medium
- Sensor: APS-C 23.5 × 15.6 mm CMOS sensor
- Maximum resolution: 24.32 megapixels (6016×4000)
- Film speed: ISO 100–819,200 in 1, 1/2, or 1/3 EV steps
- Recording medium: 1 slot for SD/SDHC/SDXC; dedicated Flucard for wireless tethering available

Exposure/metering
- Exposure modes: Green (fully automatic), program, aperture priority, shutter priority, sensitivity priority, aperture and shutter priority, manual, bulb, five User presets.
- Exposure metering: 86,000-pixel RGB metering sensor with Real-Time Scene Analysis System
- Metering modes: Multi-segment, Center-weighted, Spot

Flash
- Flash: Onboard pop-up flash; hot shoe for P-TTL flash units with high-speed sync support; PC socket for studio flashes; 1/180 s X-sync speed

Shutter
- Shutter speed range: Mechanical shutter: 1/6000 to 30 sec, Bulb; Electronic shutter: 1/24000 to 30 sec
- Continuous shooting: Up to 7 fps

Viewfinder
- Viewfinder: Eye-level pentaprism, 100% coverage, 0.95× magnification
- Viewfinder magnification: 0.63x

General
- LCD screen: 3.0 in (76 mm), 921,000 dots
- Battery: D-LI109 lithium-ion rechargeable battery
- Dimensions: 131.5×101×76 mm (5.18×3.98×2.99 in)
- Weight: With battery: 703 g (24.8 oz); Without battery: 643 g (22.7 oz)
- Made in: Philippines

The Pentax KP is a 24 megapixel compact APS-C AA-filterless digital SLR camera announced by Ricoh on January 25, 2017. It features a PRIME IV image processor with an "image accelerator unit" that supports its operation up to ISO 819,200. It has a 1/6000s conventional and 1/24,000s electronic shutter (available in Live View). In terms of bracketing modes, it adds depth of field and shutter speed bracketing. The Pentax KP uses the Pentax K-mount interchangeable lens system.

== Compared to Pentax K-70 ==
The Pentax KP is similar in many aspects to the about half year older K-70 but significantly more expensive. The differences are:

- The KP has a more vintage, old film SLR looking body and they also have a different button layout.
- The material of the bodies is also different, the KP has a magnesium alloy construction built on a stainless steel chassis whereas the K-70 is made out of plastic.
- The KP can shoot a 7 fps continuous burst, the K-70 is one fps slower.
- The maximum ISO sensitivity is eight times higher on the KP (819,200 vs 102,400).
- The image sensor in the KP has a 0.1 MP resolution advantage
- The KP autofocus features 16 more focus points (27, 25 of them are cross type vs 11, 9 of them are cross type).
- The KP has the option to use electronic shutter instead of a mechanical shutter.
- The K-70 can take 20 more pictures with one battery charge (410 vs 390 shots) and two times longer flash coverage (12 meters vs 6 meters).
- The rear display can only tilt in the KP, the one in the K-70 is fully articulated while using the same LCD panel.
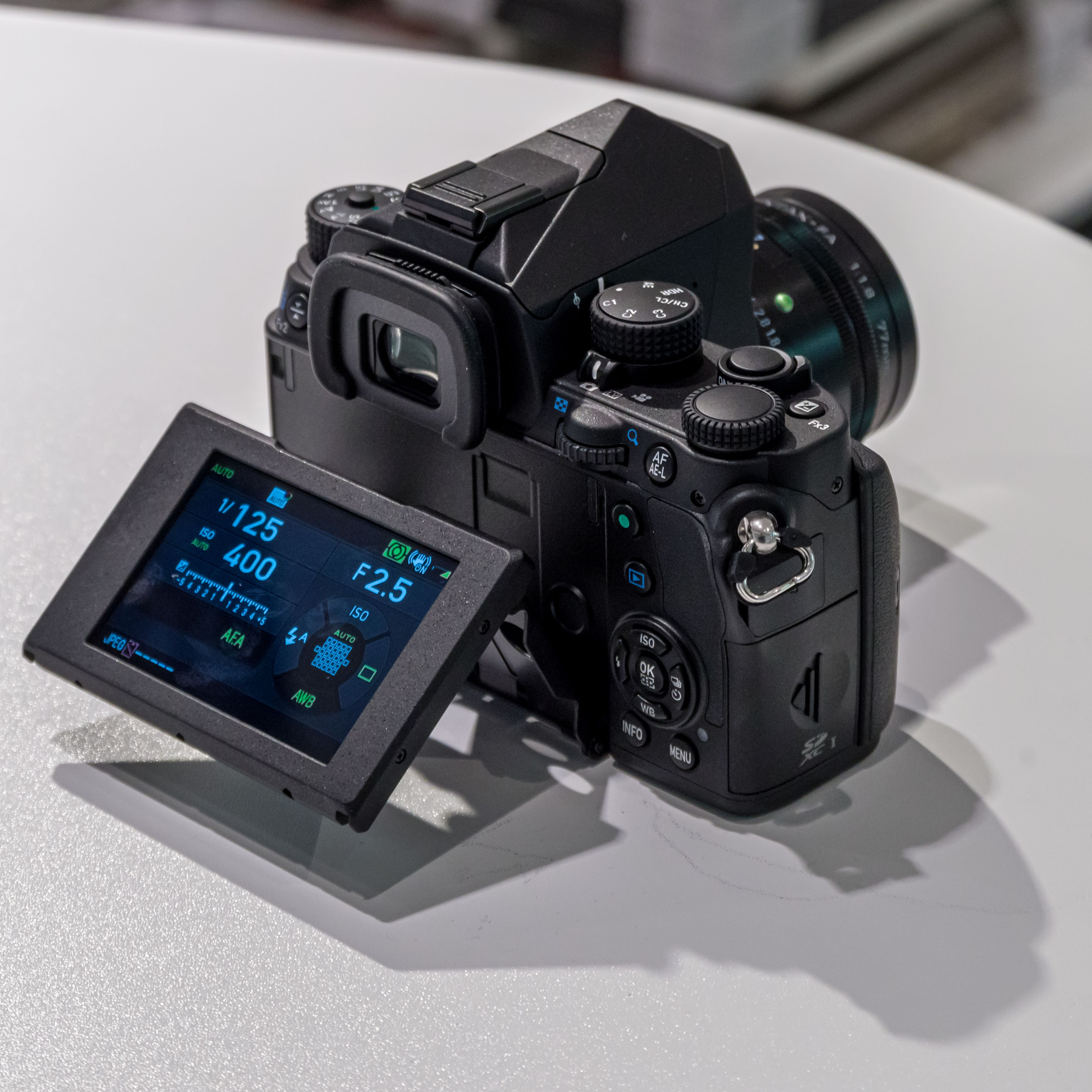

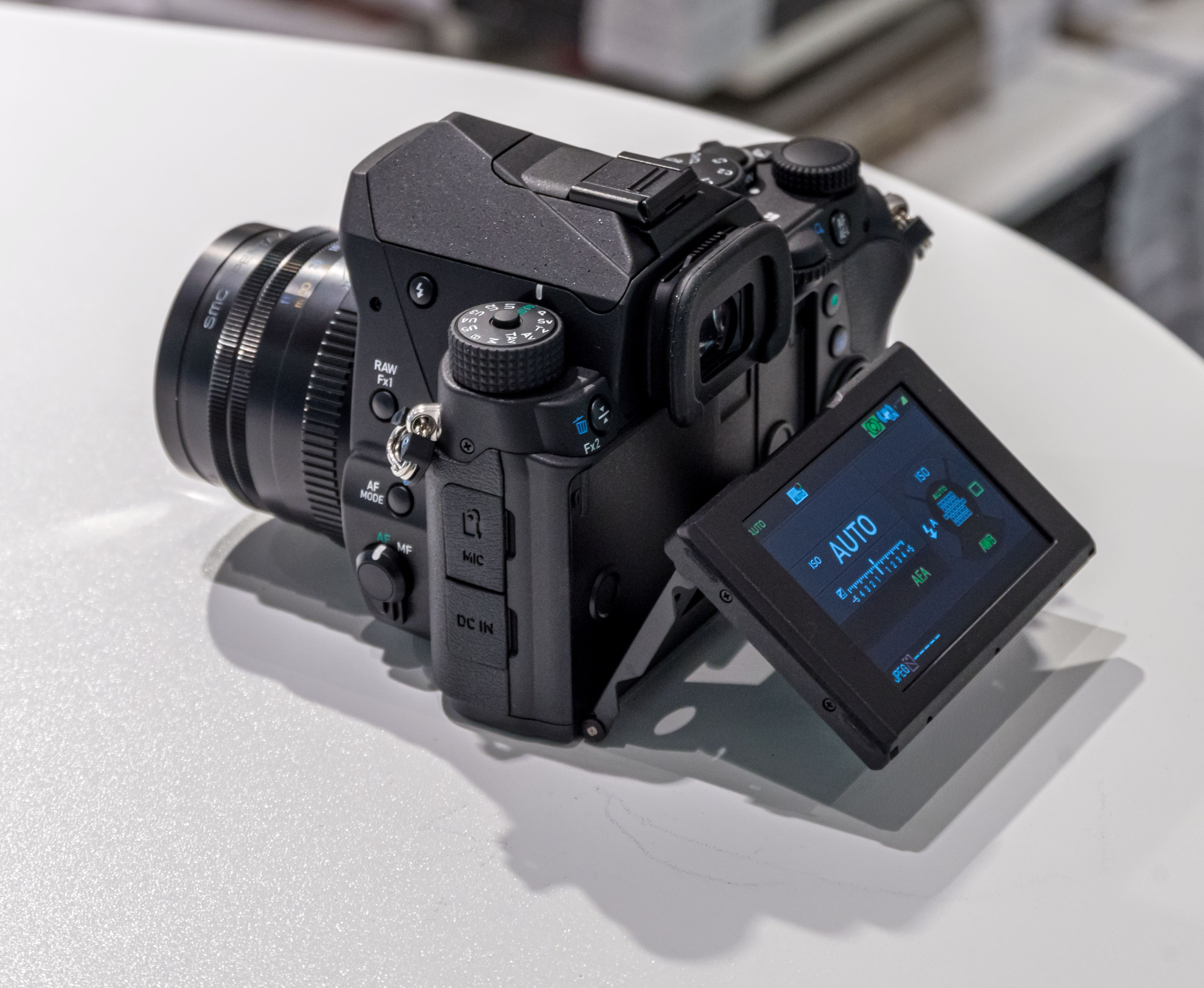

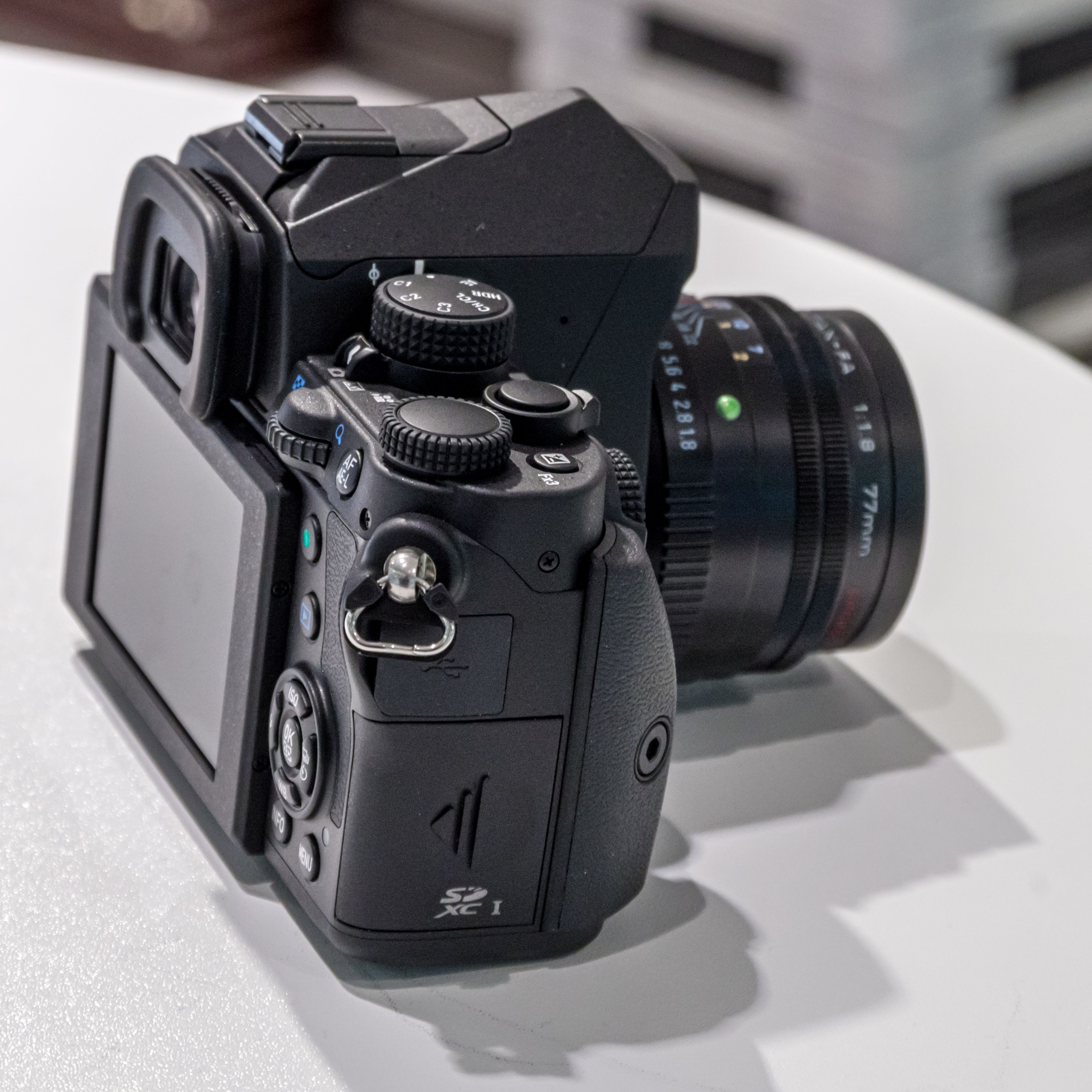

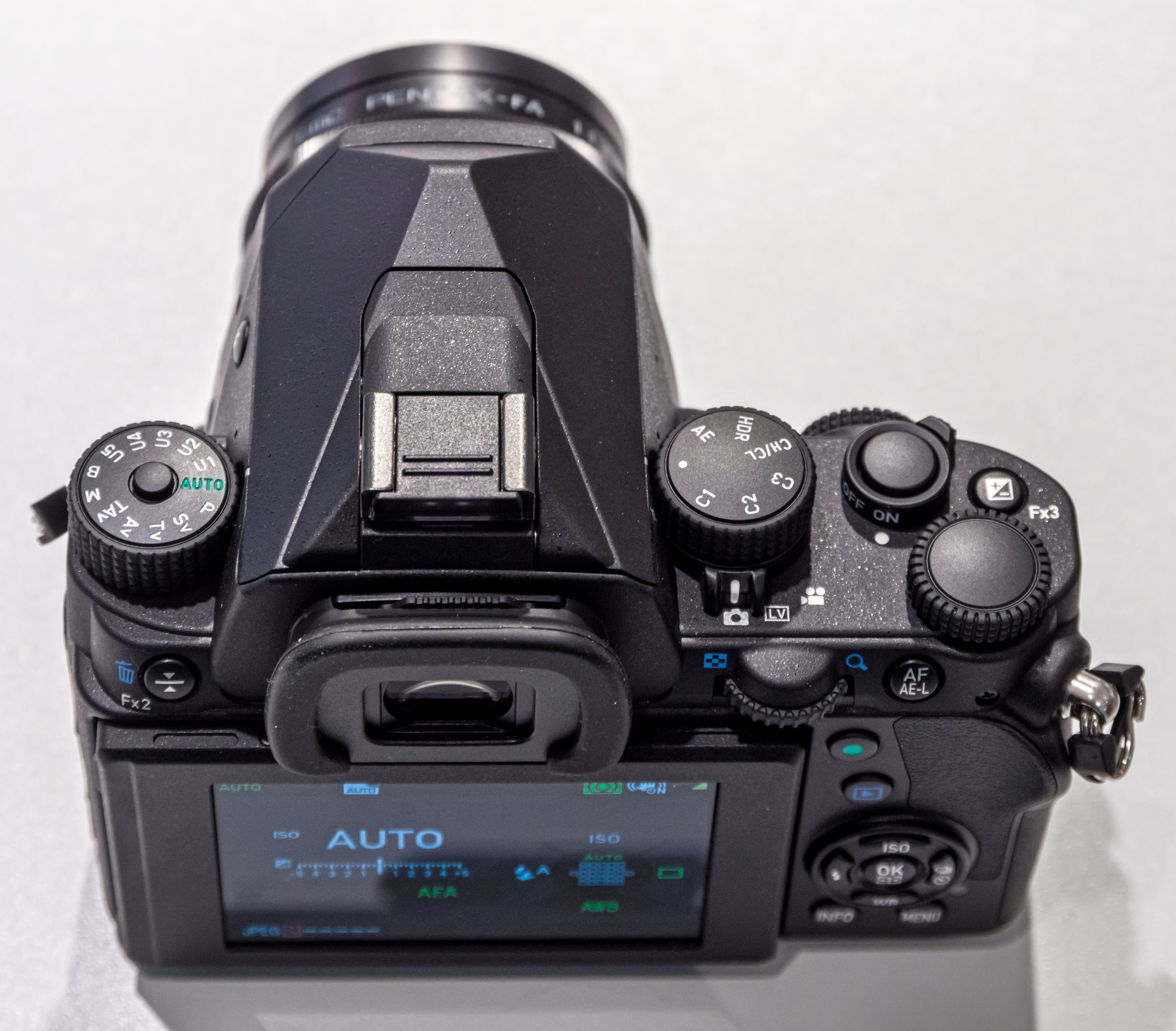

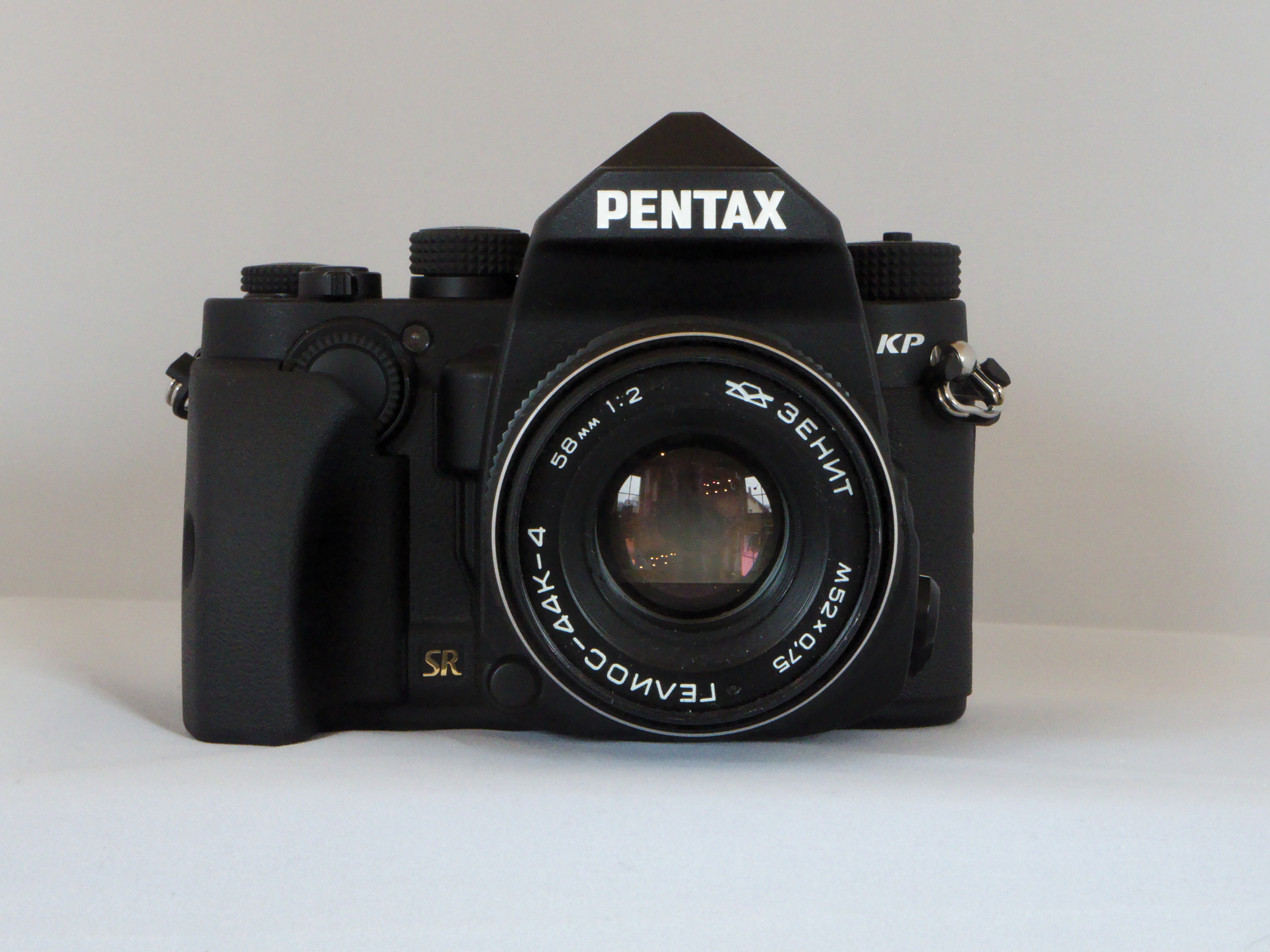

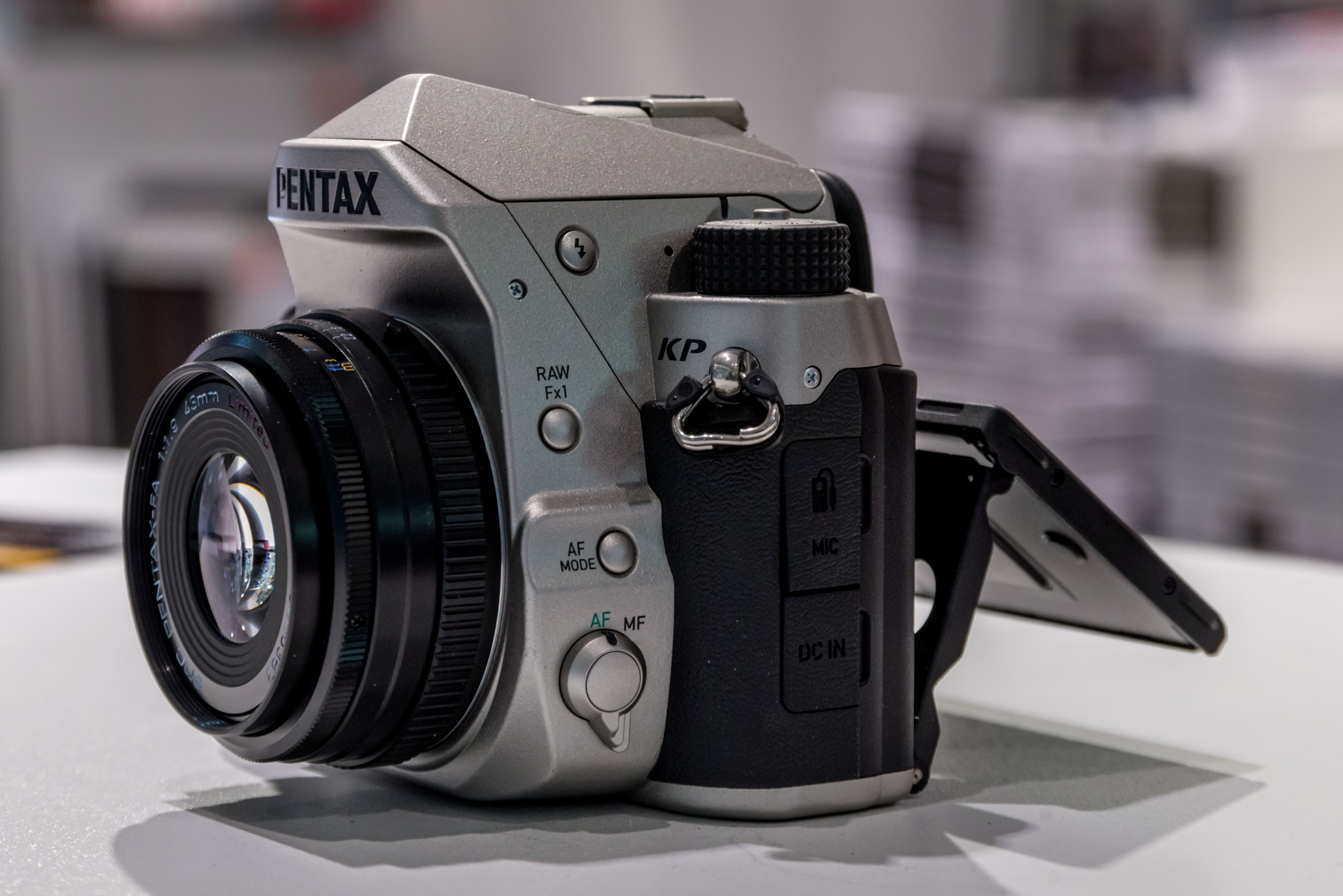

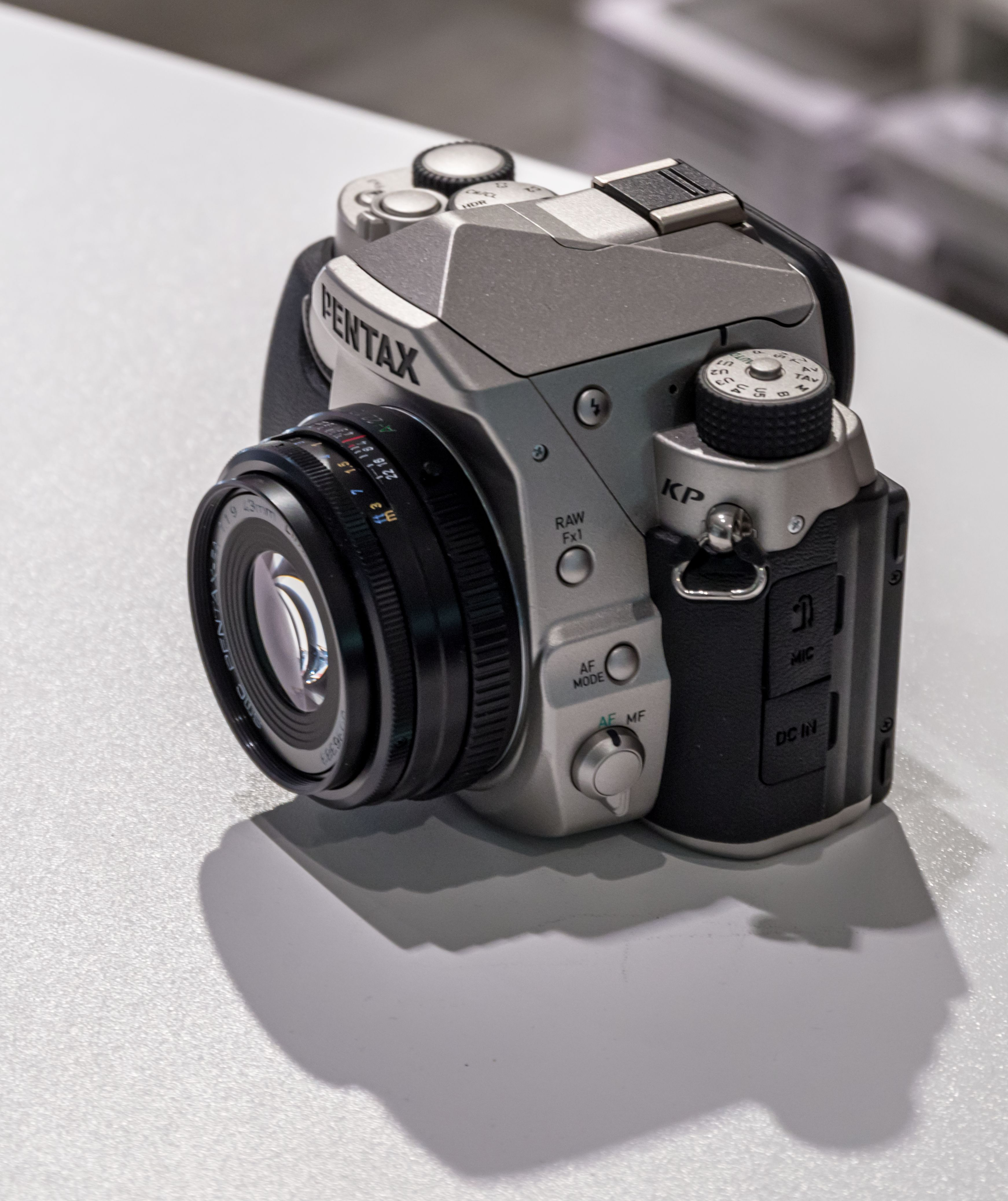

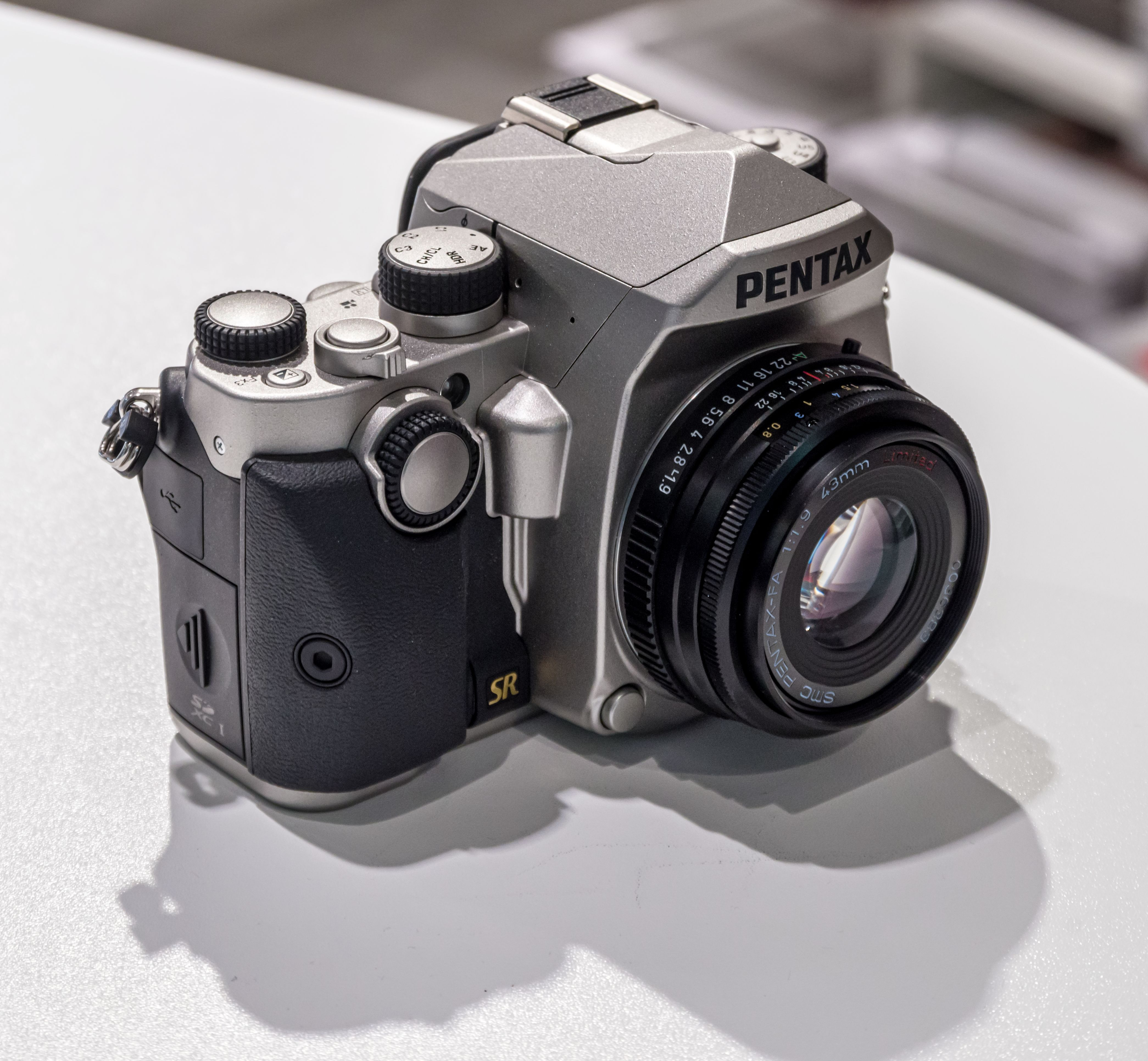

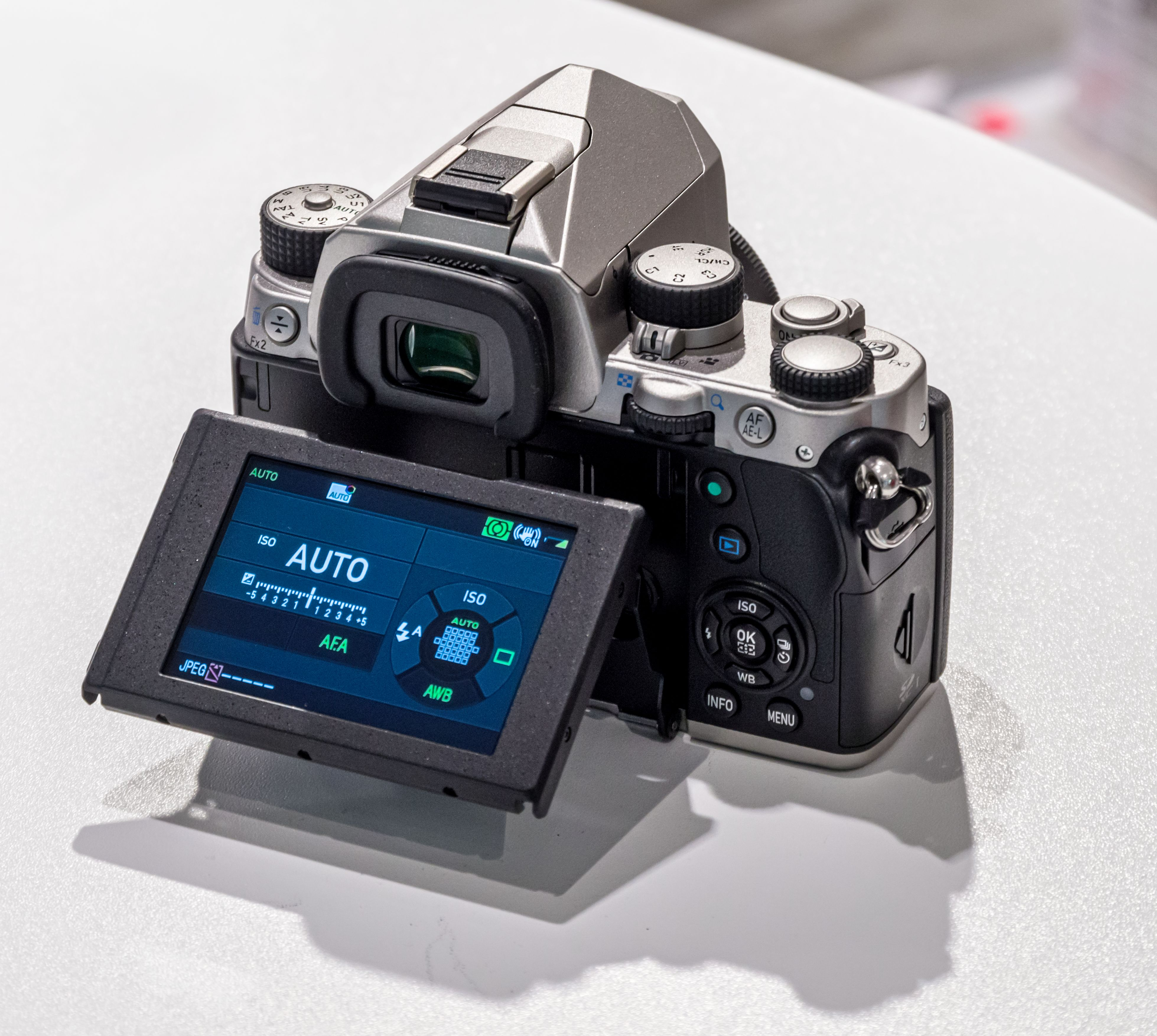

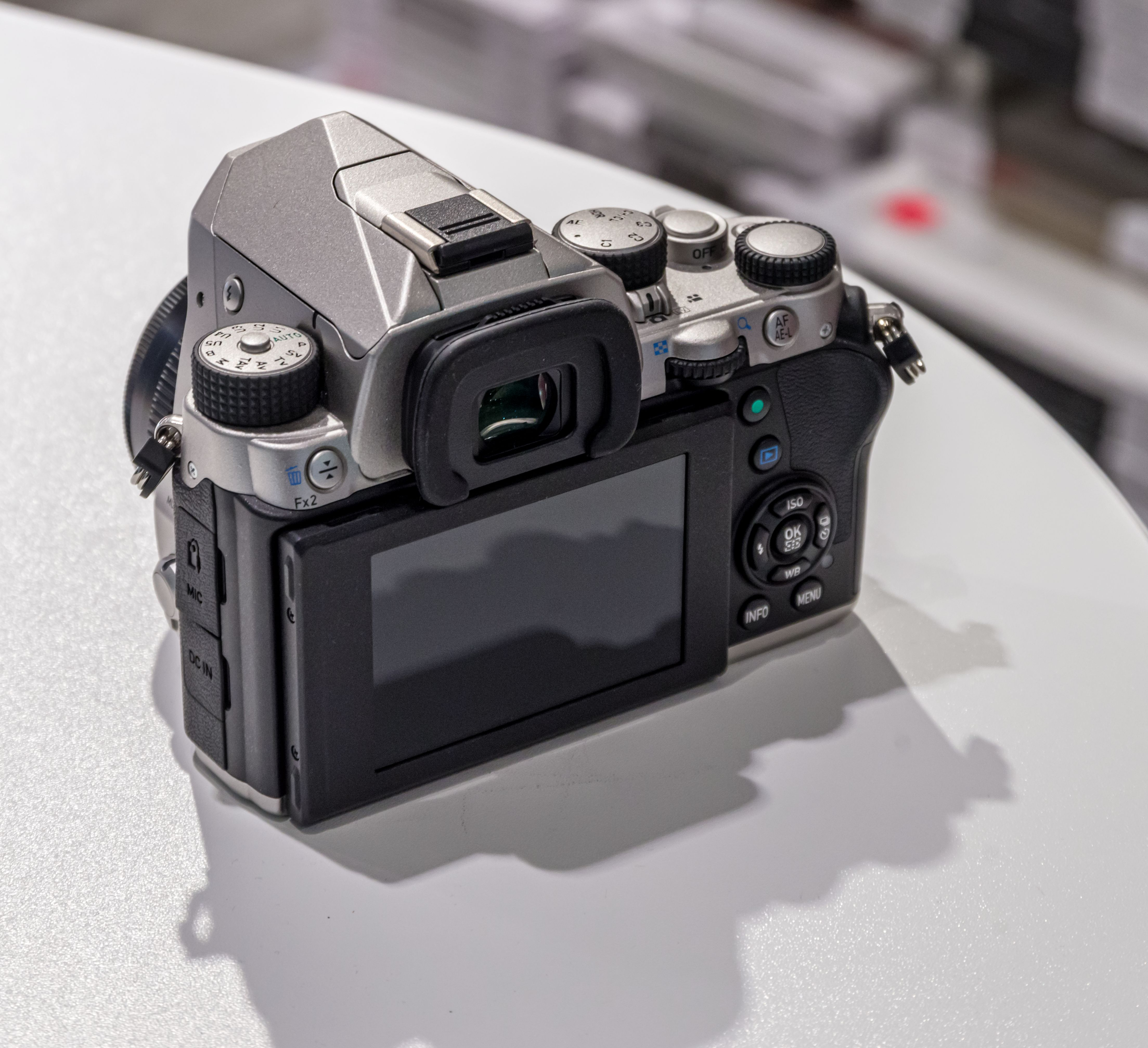

Type	Sensor	Class	2003	2004	2005	2006		2007	2008	2009	2010	2011	2012	2013	2014	2015	2016	2017	2018	2019	2020	2021	2022	2023	2024	2025
DSLR	MF	Professional										645D				645Z										
DSLR	FF	Professional																K-1		K-1 II						
DSLR	APS-C	High-end															K-3 II						K-3 III			
DSLR	APS-C	High-end													K-3											
DSLR	APS-C	Advanced									K-7	K-5		K-5 II / K-5 IIs												
DSLR	APS-C	Advanced		*ist D			K10D		K20D									KP								
DSLR	APS-C	Midrange					K100D	100DS	K200D					K-30	K-50			K-70						KF		
DSLR	APS-C	Entry-level			*ist DS	*ist DS2						K-r			K-500	K-S2										
DSLR	APS-C	Entry-level			*ist DL	DL2	K110D			K-m/K2000	K-x					K-S1										
MILC	APS-C	K-mount											K-01													
MILC	1/1.7"	Q-mount													Q7											
MILC	1/1.7"	Q-mount														Q-S1										
MILC	1/2.3"	Q-mount											Q	Q10												
DSLR	Prototypes		MZ-D (2000); 645D Prototype (2006); AP 50th Anniv. (2007)																							
Type	Sensor	Class																								
Type	Sensor	Class	2003	2004	2005	2006		2007	2008	2009	2010	2011	2012	2013	2014	2015	2016	2017	2018	2019	2020	2021	2022	2023	2024	2025
