= KDE Image Plugin Interface =

Image processing application programming interface

KDE Image Plugin Interface (usually abbreviated to Kipi or KIPI) is an API that allows creation of application-independent image processing plugins in the KDE project.

== Host applications ==
- Digikam
- KPhotoAlbum (previously named KimDaBa)
- ShowImg
- Gwenview
- KSquirrel (since 0.7.0-pre1)

== Plugins ==
=== Acquisition and management ===
- Acquire Images provides tools to capture new images and saves them to the collections.
- Kamera klient is a tool to connect the computer to a digital camera.
- Batch process.
- Find duplicates is a tool to find duplicate photographs on image collections.

=== Metadata/Time ===
- MetadataEdit.
- Time adjust is a tool for adjusting image files timestamp.

=== Transform/Convert ===
- JPEG loss less is a tool to transform the images without loss in quality due to compression.
- MPEG encoder is a tool for converting a series of images into a diashow-style MPEG file.
- RAW image converter, is a conversion tool for raw format images.

=== Export/Send ===
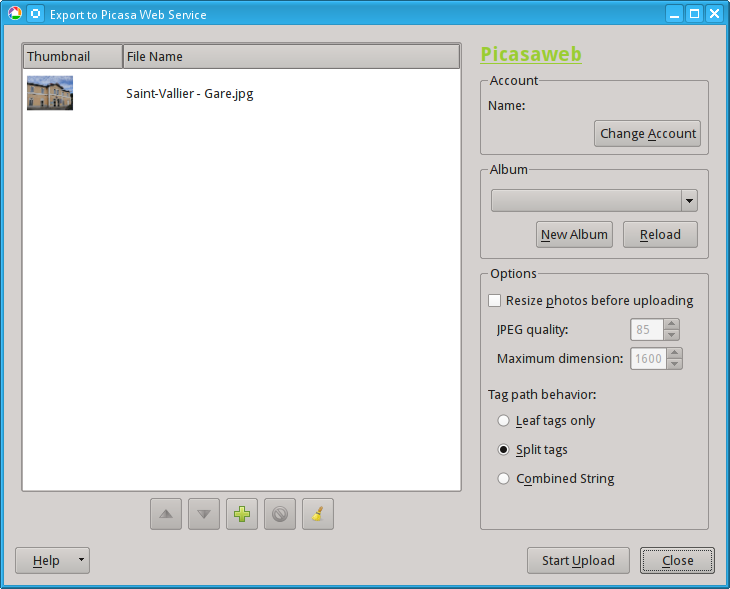
Export to Picasaweb

- Flickr export allows the user to upload photos to the Flickr web service.
- Gallery export is a tool for export image collections to a remote Gallery server.
- HTML export is a tool for exporting a set of albums to an HTML page.
- iPod export.
- MediaWiki export is a tool to upload images on any MediaWiki installation.
- Simpleviewer Export.
- Send images is a tool for sending images directly by e-mail.

=== Authoring ===
- Calendar is a tool to create calendar from image collections.
- Slide Show — plugin creates a full screen slideshow of the images.

=== Output ===
- CD archiving is a tool to back up image collections.
- Print wizard is a tool to print images at the same time.

=== Other ===
- GPS Sync.
- OpenGL Imageviewer is a tool which lets the user perform actions such as zooming or proceeding to the next image very fast.
- Wall paper is a tool to put an image as the desktop background.
