= TIFF/EP =

Digital image file format

- Filename extension: .tiff, .tif
- Internet media type: image/tiff
- Developed by: International Organization for Standardization
- Initial release: 2001
- Latest release: ISO 12234-2:2001; 2001; 24 years ago
- Type of format: Image file formats
- Container for: Metadata
- Extended from: TIFF and Exif
- Extended to: Digital Negative
- Standard: ISO 12234-2

Tag Image File Format/Electronic Photography (TIFF/EP) is a digital image file format standard – ISO 12234-2, titled "Electronic still-picture imaging – Removable memory – Part 2: TIFF/EP image data format". This is different from the Tag Image File Format, which is a standard administered by Adobe currently called "TIFF, Revision 6.0 Final – June 3, 1992".

The TIFF/EP standard is based on a subset of the Adobe TIFF standard, and a subset of the JEITA Exif standard, with some differences and extensions.

One of the uses of TIFF/EP is as a raw image format. A characteristic of most digital cameras (but excluding those using the Foveon X3 sensor or similar, hence especially Sigma cameras) is that they use a color filter array (CFA). Software processing a raw image format for such a camera needs information about the configuration of the color filter array, so that the raw image can identify separate data from the individual sites of the sensor. Ideally this information is held within the raw image file itself, and TIFF/EP uses the tags that begin "CFA", CFARepeatPatternDim, and CFAPattern, which are only relevant for raw images.

This standard has not been adopted by most camera manufacturers – Exif/DCF is the current industry standard file organisation system which uses the exchangeable image file format. However, TIFF/EP provided a basis for the raw image formats of a number of cameras. One example is Nikon's NEF raw file format, which uses the tag TIFF/EPStandardID (with value 1.0.0.0). Adobe's Digital Negative (DNG) raw file format was based on TIFF/EP, and the DNG specification states "DNG... is compatible with the TIFF-EP standard". Several cameras use DNG as their raw file format, so in that limited sense they use TIFF/EP too.

== New tags ==
The following new tags are defined in the TIFF/EP standard, all to be placed in the first TIFF Image File Directory (IFD):

TIFF/EP Tag#	Tag Name
014A_{16}	SubIFDs
015B_{16}	JPEGTables
828D_{16}	CFARepeatPatternDim
828F_{16}	BatteryLevel
83BB_{16}	IPTC/NAA
8773_{16}	InterColorProfile
8829_{16}	Interlace
882A_{16}	TimeZoneOffset
882B_{16}	SelfTimerMode
920D_{16}	Noise
9211_{16}	ImageNumber
9212_{16}	SecurityClassification
9213_{16}	ImageHistory
9216_{16}	TIFF/EPStandardID

== Differences from TIFF and Exif ==
There are no major departures by the TIFF/EP standard from the TIFF standard, except that many of the TIFF tags are ignored.

The TIFF/EP standard does however have a few notable differences from the Exif standards:

- All tags used by TIFF/EP which are defined by the Exif standard to reside within the Exif Sub-IFD now reside directly under the first (main) TIFF IFD.
- The Exif IFD Sub-IFD, Interoperability Sub-IFD and the MakerNote Tag have all been omitted.
- Unlike the TIFF 6.0 standard, the TIFF/EP standard defines a method of dealing with thumbnail images. This however is different from the method that is used in the Exif standard.
- Several tags defined by the Exif standard have been re-defined in the TIFF/EP standard – see table below.

TIFF/EP Tag#	Exif Tag#	Tag Name
920B_{16}	A20B_{16}	FlashEnergy
920C_{16}	A20C_{16}	SpatialFrequencyResponse
920E_{16}	A20E_{16}	FocalPlaneXResolution
920F_{16}	A20F_{16}	FocalPlaneYResolution
9210_{16}	A210_{16}	FocalPlaneResolutionUnit
9214_{16}	A214_{16}	SubjectLocation
9215_{16}	A215_{16}	ExposureIndex
9217_{16}	A217_{16}	SensingMethod
828E_{16}	A302_{16}	CFAPattern

== Compression ==
Images in TIFF/EP files may be stored in uncompressed form, or using JPEG baseline DCT-based lossy compression. TIFF/EP also allows usage of other compression methods, but TIFF/EP readers are not required to decompress these images. All TIFF/EP readers shall support the DCT (lossy) baseline version of the TIFF/JPEG compression method described in TIFF 6.0 Technical note #2. The JPEG compression is indicated using a value of 0007_{16} in the Compression tag-field as a binary value.

There may be more than one image (subfile) in a TIFF 6.0 file. Each subfile is defined by Image File Directory (IFD). If an image compression method is used in TIFF/EP, an uncompressed Baseline TIFF-readable "thumbnail" image (with a reduced-resolution) should also be stored in the 0th IFD of TIFF/EP, to allow the images to be viewed and identified using a Baseline TIFF 6.0 reader. (Note: JPEG compression is not required for Baseline TIFF 6.0 readers.)

TIFF/EP files may optionally use lossless JPEG compression and other JPEG compressions, but TIFF/EP readers are not required to decompress these images. If the lossless JPEG compression is used, the recommended form is lossless sequential DPCM using Huffman coding. TIFF/EP files may also optionally support vendor unique compression, but TIFF/EP readers are only required to open the uncompressed "thumbnail" image that may be present in IFD0. Proprietary compression methods can be used by obtaining a private compression tag value from the TIFF administrator (Adobe).

TIFF/EP complies with the TIFF 6.0 specification. The reason is to maintain compatibility with existing TIFF readers, and to make the adoption of TIFF/EP as easy as possible.

The TIFF Tag 259 (0103_{16}) stores the information about the Compression method. Its use is mandatory in TIFF/EP. There is no default value in TIFF/EP, but the tag value shall equal "0001_{16}" for the thumbnail IFD. The following is a list of defined TIFF/EP compression schemes:

TIFF/EP Compression Tag values
Tag value	Compression scheme	Description
0001_{16}	Uncompressed	Shall be supported by TIFF/EP readers; shall be used for the thumbnail IFD; may be used for images
0007_{16}	TIFF/JPEG compression ('new-style' JPEG)	TIFF/EP readers are only required to support Baseline DCT JPEG method
Other values > 7FFF_{16}	Vendor unique compression methods	TIFF/EP readers are not required to support these compressions

== Timeline for development and revision ==
Dates limited to publicly available sources:

Date	Event
1998	A DIS (Draft International Standard) of TIFF/EP was available from ISO.
2001	TIFF/EP was ratified and published by ISO as an International Standard.
2006	TIFF/EP began its 5-year revision cycle by ISO Working Group WG18.
2007 (March)	An email from WG18 stated "The Adobe DNG format was derived from this standard and the group has Adobe's permission to incorporate modifications and developments made for DNG in the new standard".
2008 (May)	There was further confirmation that Adobe had offered the DNG specification to ISO as part of ISO's TIFF/EP standard.
2008 (September)	Minutes of ISO/TC 130/WG2 — Prepress Data Exchange, 37th Meeting: "WG 18 is revising the two-part standard (ISO 12234), which addresses digital camera removable memory. The revision of Part 1 will add JPEG2000; the revision of Part 2 will add DNG into TIFF/EP."
2009 (September)	Minutes of ISO/TC 130/WG2 — Prepress Data Exchange, 39th Meeting: the revision "is comprehensive to support many different use cases, including backward compatibility with current TIFF readers and support of Adobe DNG. There are two interoperability profiles defined: Profile 1 (proposed extension .tif) will provide an intended output-referred interpretation (reproduction color appearance), supporting any color encoding that can be supported using an ICC profile, including output-referred, scene-referred, and demosaiced camera raw... Profile 2 (proposed extension .dng, if Adobe is in agreement) is intended for camera raw images, including un-demosaiced images... This format will be similar to DNG 1.3, which serves as the starting point for development."

== See also ==
- TIFF (Tag Image File Format)
- Exif (Exchangeable image file format)
- Design rule for Camera File system (DCF)
- International Organization for Standardization
- List of ISO standards
