= Pentax 645D =

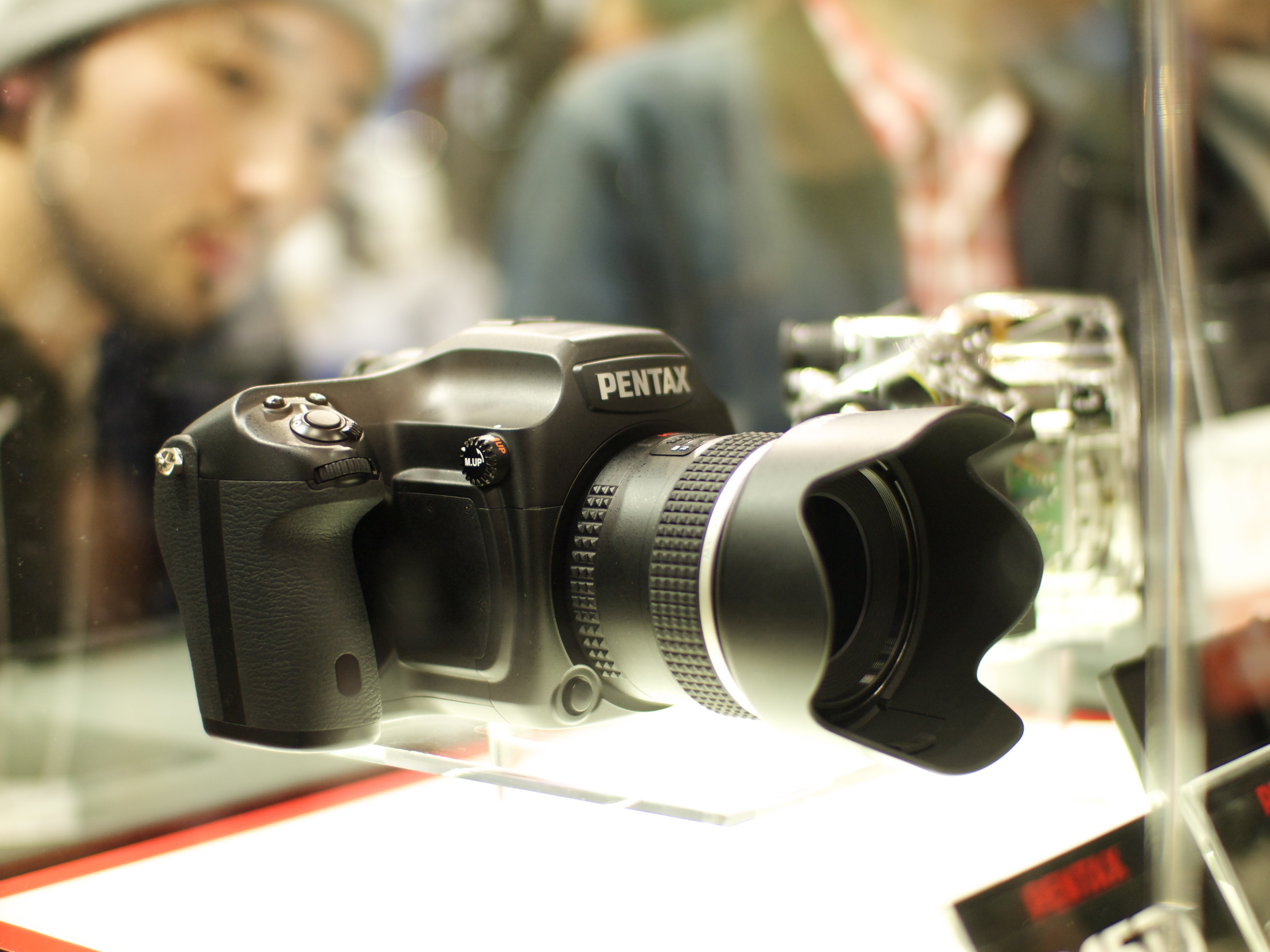

Overview
- Maker: Pentax

Sensor/medium
- Sensor type: CCD
- Sensor size: 44 x 33mm (Medium format)
- Sensor maker: Kodak
- Maximum resolution: 7264 x 5440 (40 megapixels)
- Film speed: 100 to 1600
- Recording medium: SD or SDHC memory card

Focusing
- Focus areas: 11 focus points

Shutter
- Shutter speeds: 1/4000s to 30s
- Continuous shooting: 1 frame per second

Viewfinder
- Viewfinder magnification: 0.85
- Frame coverage: 98%

Image processing
- Image processor: Prime II
- White balance: Yes

General
- LCD screen: 3 inches with 921,000 dots
- Dimensions: 156 x 117 x 119mm (6.14 x 4.61 x 4.69 inches)
- Weight: 1,480 g (52 oz) including battery

The Pentax 645D is a medium format digital SLR camera announced by Pentax on March 10, 2010.

Unlike other medium-format DSLRs, which accept digital camera backs of different resolutions or even manufacturers, the 645D has a fixed-back design similar to smaller full-frame and APS-C DSLRs. The fixed back allows the 645D to be fully weather-sealed.

== Awards ==
The 645D was awarded the Camera of the Year award at the Camera Grand Prix Japan 2011. Pentax celebrated this with the release of a limited edition of the camera.

Type	Sensor	Class	2003	2004	2005	2006		2007	2008	2009	2010	2011	2012	2013	2014	2015	2016	2017	2018	2019	2020	2021	2022	2023	2024	2025
DSLR	MF	Professional										645D				645Z										
DSLR	FF	Professional																K-1		K-1 II						
DSLR	APS-C	High-end															K-3 II						K-3 III			
DSLR	APS-C	High-end													K-3											
DSLR	APS-C	Advanced									K-7	K-5		K-5 II / K-5 IIs												
DSLR	APS-C	Advanced		*ist D			K10D		K20D									KP								
DSLR	APS-C	Midrange					K100D	100DS	K200D					K-30	K-50			K-70						KF		
DSLR	APS-C	Entry-level			*ist DS	*ist DS2						K-r			K-500	K-S2										
DSLR	APS-C	Entry-level			*ist DL	DL2	K110D			K-m/K2000	K-x					K-S1										
MILC	APS-C	K-mount											K-01													
MILC	1/1.7"	Q-mount													Q7											
MILC	1/1.7"	Q-mount														Q-S1										
MILC	1/2.3"	Q-mount											Q	Q10												
DSLR	Prototypes		MZ-D (2000); 645D Prototype (2006); AP 50th Anniv. (2007)																							
Type	Sensor	Class																								
Type	Sensor	Class	2003	2004	2005	2006		2007	2008	2009	2010	2011	2012	2013	2014	2015	2016	2017	2018	2019	2020	2021	2022	2023	2024	2025
