= MegaVision (cameras) =

MegaVison, Inc.
- Type: Corporation
- Industry: Digital imaging
- Founded: United States (1983)
- Headquarters: Santa Barbara, California
- Key people: Ken Boydston, President, Brian Amrine Color Mathematics, Richard Colvin, Electrical Engineering, Lynn Watson, Software Engineering, Richard Chang, John Cox
- Products: Digital backs, RAW processing software, Multi-spectral imaging system
- Website: www.mega-vision.com www.megavision-international.com www.tech-vision.eu

MegaVision is an American company that manufactures high-end digital photographic equipment. It was founded in 1983 to create a state-of-the-art image processing computer. MegaVision was the first company to produce a digital camera back for sale, using a 4 megapixel vidicon tube behind a Cambo technical view camera. MegaVision has always produced the capture software that controls their camera hardware. MegaVision produced the first live focus video in a digital still camera porting video over twisted pair wires (1993). MegaVision produced the first gamut alarm light metering with their Color Coded Light Metering (1993). MegaVision produced the first RAW file removable media digital camera with the Batpac digitizer and the S2/S3 series camera backs (1996). MegaVision produced the first computer mounted digital camera back using the E3/E4/E5 and the OQO computers (2005). MegaVision currently produces a 10 band visible plus 365 nm UV and 5 band IR EurekaVision lighting system initially developed for their 39 megapixel Monochrome camera back. Outside of US and Canada, MegaVision products are officially distributed in Asia through Megavision International Pte Ltd. and in EMEA COUNTRIES through TechVision

== Products ==
=== Digital backs ===
==== single shot ====
===== E series =====
- E2 4 megapixel non-mydriatic diabetic retinopathy
- E3/E427 6/11-megapixel ophthalmic
- E7 50-megapixel
- Monochrome and Bayer pattern Color

===== S series (discontinued) =====
Color information is obtained with a color filter array in front of the sensor

- S4 16-megapixel 36 mm square CCD sensor with 9 μm pixel size
- S3 / S3pro 6-megapixel 24 mm x 26 mm CCD sensor with 12 μm pixel size
- S2 4-megapixel 31 mm square CCD sensor with 15 μm pixel size

==== Three-shot (discontinued) ====
Color information is obtained in three consecutive exposures through a red, green, and blue filter

- T32
- T2

==== Multi-Spectral ====
EurekaVision LED lighting system:

- 365 nm UV, 447 nm, 470 nm, 505 nm, 530 nm, 590 nm, 625 nm, 655 nm Visibles, 700 nm, 730 nm, 780 nm, 850 nm, 860 nm, 940 nm 1050 nm IRs
- 120mm f4.5 UV-VIS-IR Apo Macro, 320 nm-1100 nm, MegaVision Electronic Shutter System
- Single and Double filter wheel systems for detecting and characterizing fluorescence emission

=== Software ===
- Photoshoot capture software for Windows 7 and 8

== Other companies with similar products ==
Similar digital backs are manufactured / sold by Hasselblad, Leaf, and Phase One.
