= Lenses for SLR and DSLR cameras =

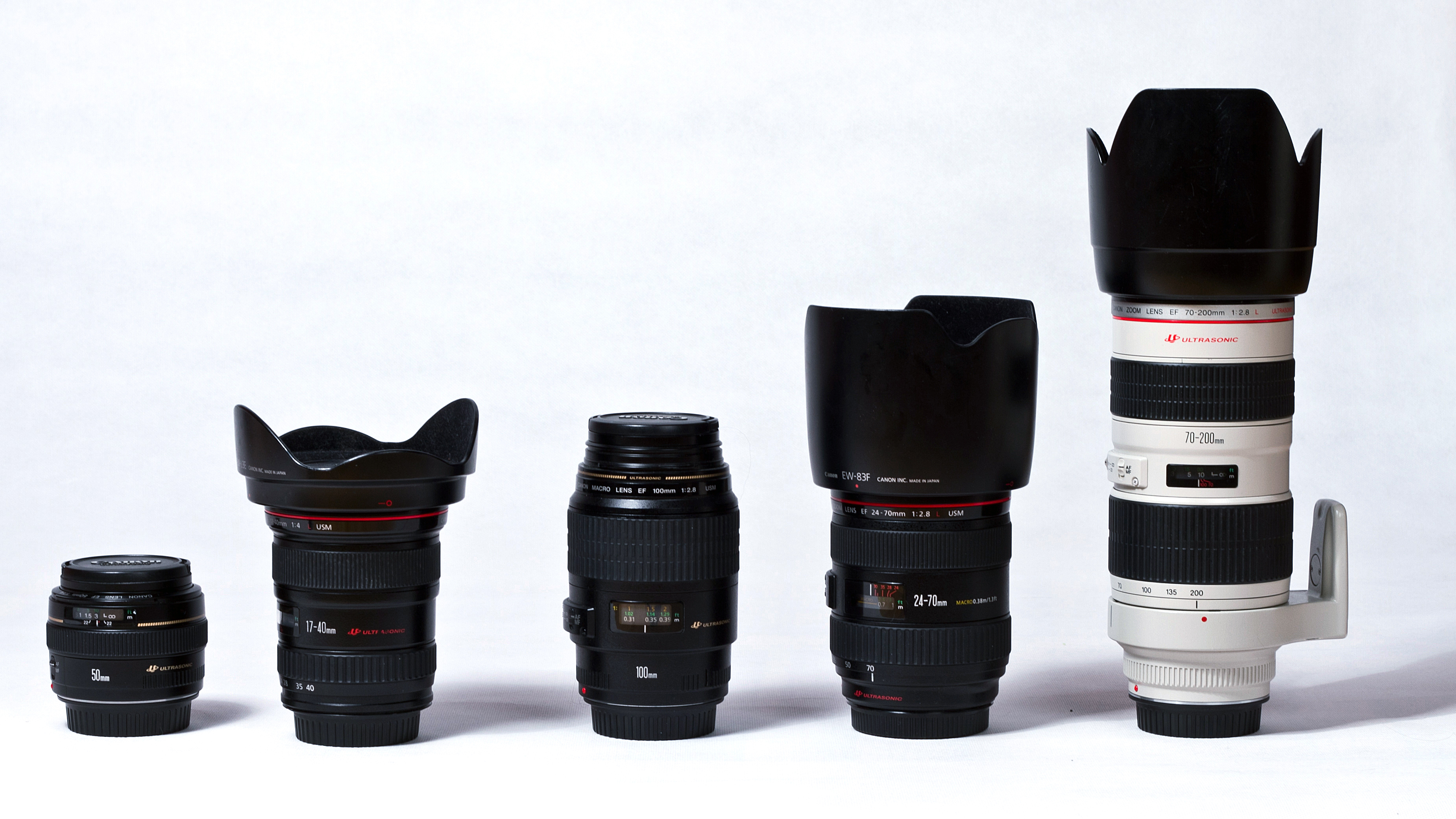
A collection of lenses a DSLR owner might have: 50mm F1.4, 17-40mm F4, 100mm F2.8 Macro, 24-70mm F2.8, 70-200mm F2.8

This article details lenses for single-lens reflex and digital single-lens reflex cameras (SLRs and DSLRs respectively). The emphasis is on modern lenses for 35 mm film SLRs and for "full-frame" DSLRs with sensor sizes less than or equal to 35 mm.

== Design ==
=== Interchangeable lenses ===
Canon EF+RF, Nikon F and Pentax K lenses sold over time

On most SLR and DSLR cameras, the lens can be changed. This enables the use of lenses that are best suited for a given photographic need, and allows for the attachment of specialized lenses. Film SLR cameras became the dominant option for professionals and enthusiasts since the late 1950s, and over the years, millions of lenses have been produced, both by camera manufacturers (who typically only make lenses intended for their own camera bodies) and by third-party optics companies who may make lenses for several different camera lines.

DSLRs were introduced in the early 1990s, and the first affordable DSLRs were introduced about ten years later, allowing those types to become the most popular interchangeable-lens option for digital photography. Some manufacturers, such as Minolta, Canon and Nikon, chose to make their DSLRs 100% compatible with their existing SLR lenses from the beginning, allowing owners of new DSLRs to continue to use their existing lenses and get a longer lifespan from their investment. Others, for example Olympus, opted for new lens mounts and series of lenses for their DSLRs. Modern Pentax DSLRs are backwards-compatible with K-mount SLR lenses, though features that are included in newer lenses (e.g. autofocus) may not work. There are a few exceptions; the MZ and ZX series of Pentax film cameras do not work with some older lenses.

In general, lenses are only directly interchangeable within the mount system for which they are built. Using a lens intended for one mounting system on a camera body with a different system requires an adapter, which can result in compromises such as loss of functionality (e.g. lack of autofocus or automatic aperture control). Furthermore, the adapter may require an additional optical element to correct the optical design, as the lens mount specifies the flange focal distance (FFD), which is the distance from the mount interface to the focal plane on the image sensor or film. In general, camera bodies with shorter FFDs permit the creation of simple mechanical adapters without additional optics; adapters may not be available to bridge every combination of lens mount and camera mount.

=== Aperture and depth of field ===
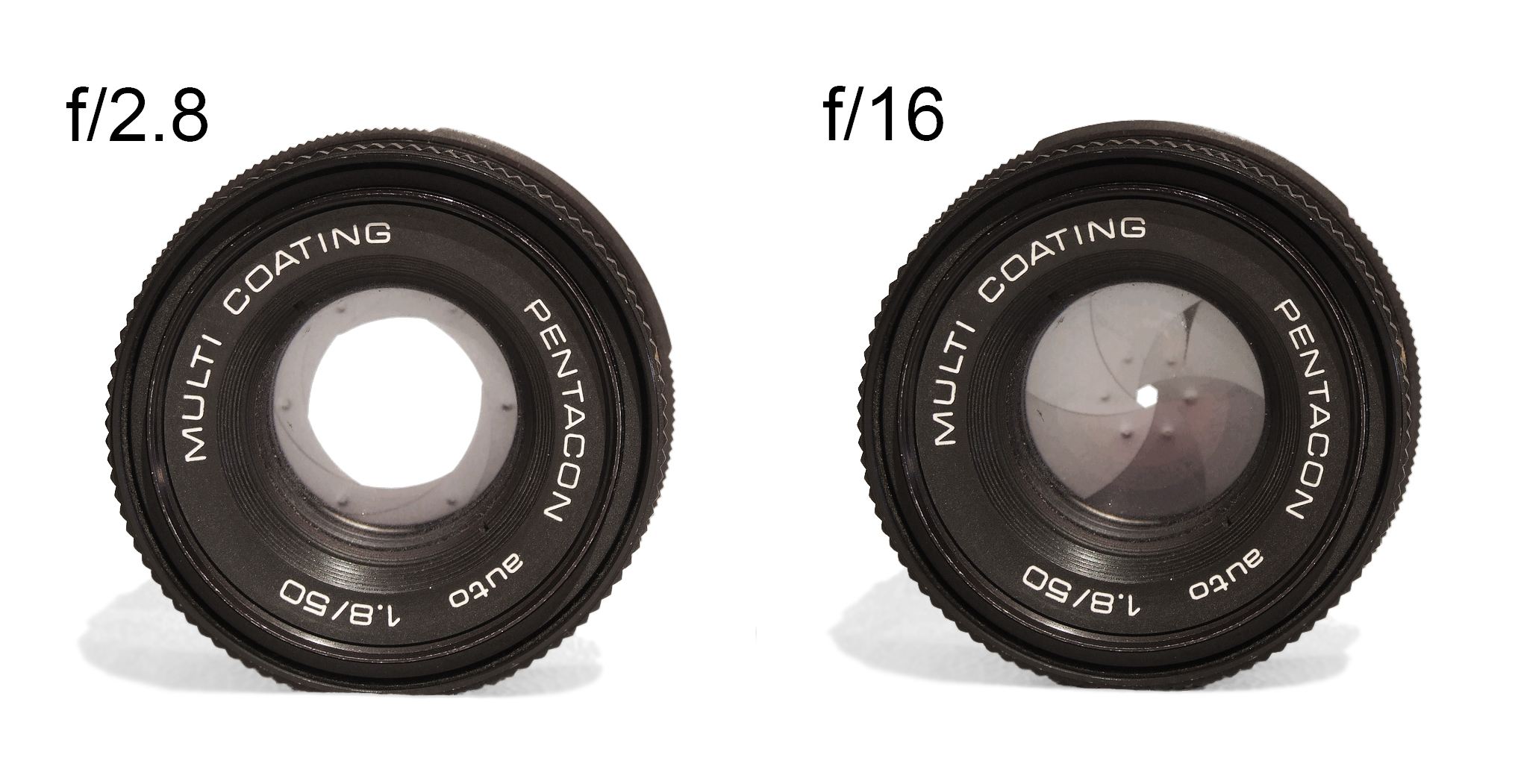
Large (1) and small (2) aperture

The aperture of a lens is the opening that regulates the amount of light that passes through the lens. It is controlled by a diaphragm inside the lens, which is in turn controlled either manually or by the exposure circuitry in the camera body.

The relative aperture is specified as an f-number, the ratio of the lens focal length to the diameter of its effective aperture. A small f-number like f/2.0 indicates a large aperture (more light passes through), while a large f-number like f/22 indicates a small aperture (little light passes through). Aperture settings are usually not continuously variable; instead, the diaphragm has typically 5–10 discrete settings. The normal "full-stop" f-number scale for modern lenses represents a halving of the light admitted by the preceding stop; since the square of the diameter is directly proportional to the area (light admitted), the scale is as follows: 1, 1.4, 2, 2.8, 4, 5.6, 8, 11, 16, 22, 32, but many lenses also allow setting it to half-stop or third-stop increments. A "slow" lens (one that is not capable of passing a lot of light through) might have a maximum aperture from 5.6 to 11, while a "fast" lens (one that can pass more light through) might have a maximum aperture from 1 to 4. Fast lenses are, by definition, larger than slow lenses (for comparable focal length), and typically cost more.

The aperture affects not only the amount of light that passes through the lens, but also the depth of field of the resulting image: a larger aperture (a smaller f-number, e.g. f/2.0) will have a shallow depth of field, while a smaller aperture (a larger f-number, e.g. f/11) will have a greater depth of field.

=== Focal length and angle of view ===
The focal length of a lens, together with the size of the image sensor or film in the camera, determines the angle of view. A lens is considered to be a "normal lens" in terms of its angle of view on a camera when its focal length is approximately equal to the diagonal dimension of the film format or image sensor format. This diagonal angle of view—about 53 degrees—is often said to approximate the angle of view of the human eye; since the angle of view of a human eye is at least 140 degrees, it is sometimes noted as "similar to the angle of crisp human vision." A wide-angle lens has a shorter focal length and includes more of the viewed scene than a normal lens; a telephoto lens has a longer focal length and captures a small portion of the scene, making it seem closer.

Lenses are not labeled or sold according to their angle of view, but rather by their focal length, usually expressed in millimeters. However, this specification is insufficient to compare lenses for different cameras, because field of view also depends on sensor size. For example, a 50 mm lens mounted on a Nikon D3 (a full-frame camera) provides approximately the same field of view as a 32 mm lens mounted on a Sony α100 (an APS-C camera). Conversely, the same lens can produce different fields of view when mounted on different cameras. For example, a 35 mm lens mounted on a full-frame Canon EOS 5D provides a slightly wide-angle view, while the same lens mounted on an APS-C Canon EOS 400D provides a "normal" or slightly telephoto view.

In order to more easily compare lens–camera pairs, it is common to use their 35 mm equivalent focal length. For example, when talking about a 14 mm lens for a Four Thirds system camera, one would not only indicate that it has a focal length of 14 mm, but also that its "35 mm equivalent focal length" is 28 mm. This way of talking about lenses is not just limited to SLR and DSLR lenses; it is very common to see this focal length equivalency in the specification of the lens on a digicam.

==== Table of formats and angle of view ====
Values in the following table are approximate, and apply to rectilinear lenses only, not to fisheye lenses.

Common camera image sensor formats and rectilinear angles of view
Sensor size (W×H)		120 film (Medium format) 42×56 mm (1.7×2.2 in) to 84×56 mm (3.3×2.2 in)	35 mm or full-frame 36×24 mm (1.42×0.94 in)	APS-H 27.9×18.6 mm (1.10×0.73 in)	APS-C 23.6×15.6 mm (0.93×0.61 in) (typ)	Foveon X3 (Note: The crop factor in this column refers to the original Foveon X3 sensor. Current versions of the Foveon X3 are standard APS-C size with a 1.5 crop factor.) 20.7×13.8 mm (0.81×0.54 in)	Four Thirds 17.3×13 mm (0.68×0.51 in)	1" 13.2×8.8 mm (0.52×0.35 in)
Crop factor		0.43 to 0.62	1	1.3	1.5 to 1.6	1.7	2	2.7
Lens type	Angle of view (deg. diagonal)	Focal length (mm)						
Ultra wide angle	118°	21 to 30	13	10	8.5	7.5	6.5	4.8
Ultra wide angle	111°	24 to 35	15	12	9.7	8.5	7.4	5.5
Ultra wide angle	100°	29 to 42	18	14	12	10	9.1	6.7
Ultra wide angle	92°	34 to 49	21	16	14	12	10	7.7
Wide Angle	84°	39 to 55	24	19	16	14	12	8.8
Wide Angle	75°	46 to 65	28	22	18	16	14	10
Wide Angle	63°	55 to 80	35	27	23	20	18	13
Normal	57°	65 to 95	40	31	26	23	20	15
Normal	51°	75 to 105	45	35	30	26	23	17
Normal	46°	80 to 120	50	39	33	29	25	19
Normal	43°	90 to 130	55	43	36	32	27	20
Short Tele	29°	135 to 200	85	65	55	48	42	31
Short Tele	23°	170 to 250	105	80	70	60	55	39
Telephoto	18°	220 to 325	135	105	90	80	70	50
Telephoto	14°	290 to 400	180	135	115	100	90	65
Telephoto	12.5°	320 to 450	200	150	130	115	100	70
Super telephoto	8°	500 to 700	300	240	200	180	160	115
Super telephoto	6°	700 to 1000	400	325	270	240	210	150
Super telephoto	5°	800 to 1200	500	375	325	275	250	180
Ultra telephoto	4°	1000 to 1400	600	475	400	350	300	230
Ultra telephoto	3°	1300 to 1900	800	600	550	475	425	300
Ultra telephoto	2°	2000 to 2900	1200	1000	800	700	600	450
Some cameras using this sensor size:		120 mm film Fuji GX680; Hasselblad 503CW; Mamiya 645; Pentax 645NII	35 mm film Canon EOS 6D; Nikon D5, D810; Pentax K-1 II; Sony α7 IV	Canon EOS-1D; Leica M8	APS film Canon EOS 90D; Nikon D7200; Pentax K-3 Mark II; Sony α6500	Sigma SD14; Sigma DP2	Leica Digilux 3 Olympus E-3; Olympus E-30; Olympus E-620; Panasonic DMC-G1	Nikon CX; Sony RX100; Samsung NX mini

== Types of lenses ==
=== Zoom lenses ===
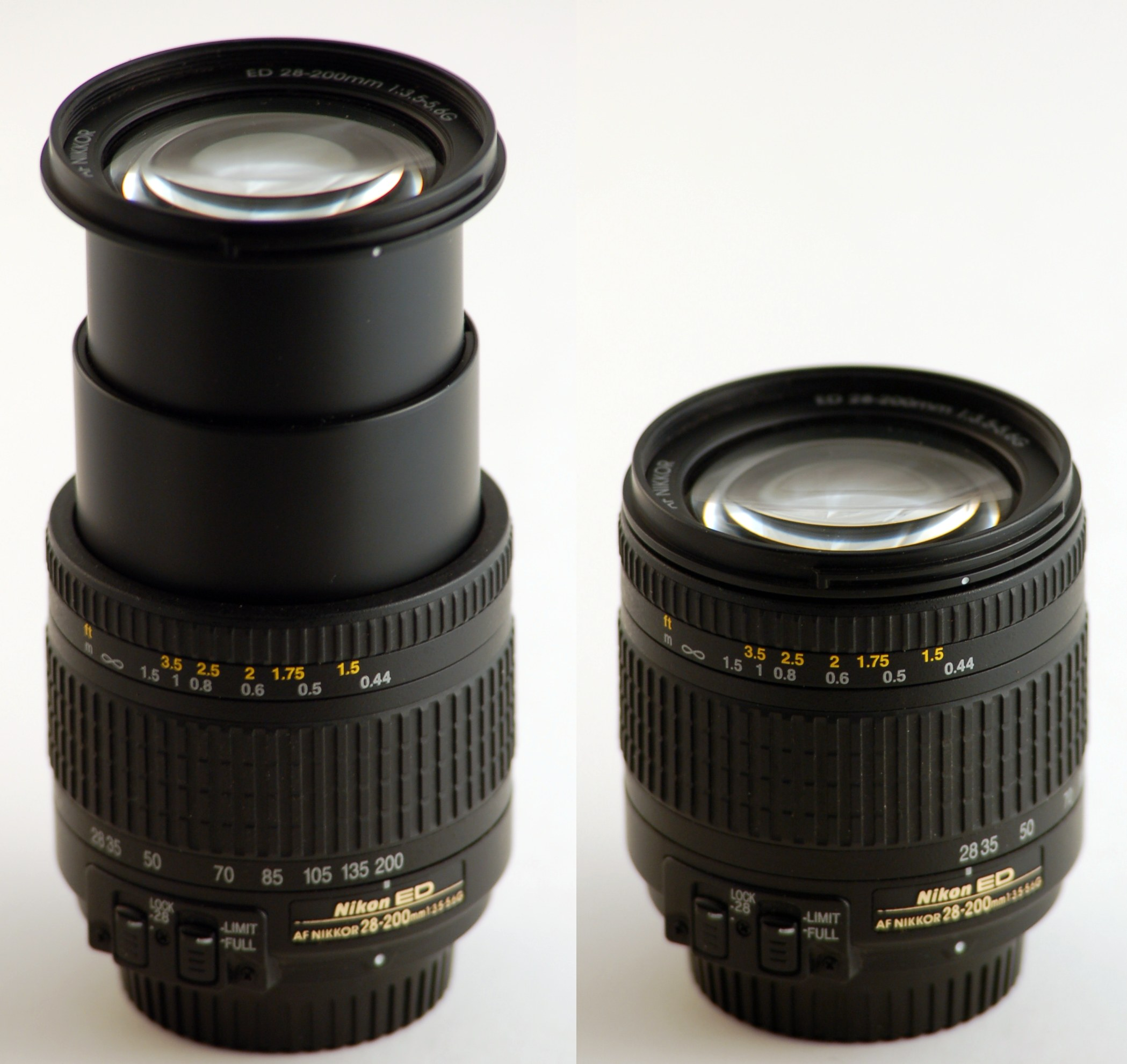
Nikkor 28–200 mm zoom lens, extended to 200 mm at left and collapsed to 28 mm at right

The focal length of a zoom lens is not fixed; instead it can be varied between a specified minimum and maximum value. Modern lens technology is such that the loss of image quality in zoom lenses (relative to non-zoom lenses) is minimal, and zoom lenses have become the standard lenses for SLRs and DSLRs. This is different from the late 1980s when, due to image quality concerns, most professional photographers still relied primarily on standard non-zoom lenses. However, zoom lenses still typically have a lower maximum aperture than fixed-focal ("prime") lenses for the same weight and cost, especially for shorter focal lengths.

Zoom lenses are often described by the ratio of their longest to shortest focal lengths. For example, a zoom lens with focal lengths ranging from 100 mm to 400 mm may be described as a 4:1 or "4×" zoom. Typical zoom lenses cover a 3.5× range, for example 24–90 mm (standard zoom) or 60–200 mm (telephoto zoom). "Super-zoom" lenses with a range of 10× or even 14× are becoming more common, although the image quality does typically suffer a bit compared with the more traditional zooms.

The maximum aperture for a zoom lens may be the same (constant) for all focal lengths, but it is more common that the maximum aperture is greater at the wide-angle end than at the telephoto end of the zoom range. For example, a 100 mm to 400 mm lens may have a maximum aperture of f/4.0 at the 100 mm end but will diminish to only f/5.6 at the 400 mm end of the zoom range. Zoom lenses with constant maximum apertures (such as f/2.8 for a 24–70mm lens) are usually reserved for lenses with higher build quality and are thus more expensive than those with variable maximum apertures.

=== Macro lenses ===
Macro lenses are designed for extreme closeup work. Such lenses are popular for nature shooting such as small flowers, as well as for many technical applications. As most of these lenses can also focus to infinity and tend to be quite sharp, many are used as general-purpose optics.

=== Special purpose lenses ===
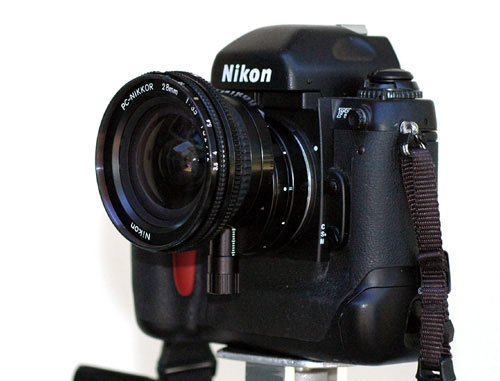
Special-purpose perspective control lens for architectural photographs

Most users of SLR and DSLR cameras stick to using zoom lenses, while a few of the more adventurous amateurs and many professional photographers also invest in a few prime lenses. Special purpose lenses are, as the designation implies, for special purposes, and are not so common.

There are many different kinds of special purpose lenses, the most popular being fisheye lenses, which are extreme wide-angle lenses with an angle of view of up to 180 degrees or more, with very noticeable (sometimes intended) distortion. Perspective control lenses and soft-focus lenses, were more popular with film SLRs but are less popular for DSLRs because the same or similar results can be obtained with post-processing software.

== Types of lens mounts ==
There is almost no commonality between different camera makers regarding lens mount systems. Each manufacturer has developed their own system, and build camera bodies and lenses that only work with their own lens mount, with the Four Thirds System being a partial exception. This was different before 1970 when most of the manufacturers use either M42 or M39 lenses, most of which can still be used depending on the particular adapter you can find.

This does not necessarily mean that one is limited to only mounting, for example, Pentax lenses on a Pentax camera body. There are independent optics companies that make lenses for the various otherwise proprietary mount systems, thus providing alternative sources for lenses that are often of equal quality and/or less expensive than the camera maker's own lenses. Another possibility is the use of adaptors that allow mounting a lens for one system on a camera with a different lens mount. However, the use of an adaptor usually results in reduced functionality, typically requiring the manual setting of aperture and focus, or perhaps not being able to use any aperture other than "wide open".

=== M42 lens mount ===
The M42 lens mount has been used by Leica, Nikon, Pentax, Canon, Zenit, Praktica, Fujica, Cosina,

The M42 lens mount is a screw thread mounting standard for attaching lenses to 35 mm cameras, primarily single-lens reflex models. It is more accurately known as the M42 × 1 mm standard, which means that it is a metric screw thread of 42 mm diameter and 1 mm thread pitch. (The M42 lens mount should not be confused with the T-mount, which shares the 42mm throat diameter, but differs by having a 0.75mm thread pitch.) It was first used in Zeiss' Contax S of 1949; this East German branch of Zeiss also sold cameras under the Pentacon name; after merger with other East German photographic manufacturers, the name Praktica was used. M42 thread mount cameras first became well known under the Praktica brand, and thus the M42 mount is known as the Praktica thread mount.[1] Since there were no proprietary elements to the M42 mount, many other manufacturers used it; this has led to it being called the Universal thread mount or Universal screw mount by many. The M42 mount was also used by Pentax; thus, it is also known as the Pentax thread mount, despite the fact that Pentax did not originate it.

=== M39 ===
Also known as LTM (Leica Thread Mount). Used by Leica and Contax and several Leica copies, like the Soviet era FEDs, and others.

=== Canon EF- and EF-S-mounts ===
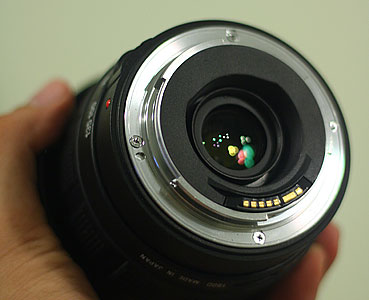
The gold-plated electronic contacts of an EF-mount lens

Canon introduced the EF-lens mount in 1987 as part of the EOS system. It broke with the most common technique for implementing autofocus at that time by not having a mechanical connection to a motor in the camera body, having instead only electrical connections and requiring a motor to be part of each autofocus lens.

The EF-S-mount is a newer subset of the EF standard, introduced in 2003. EF-S lenses can only be used on Canon digital cameras that use the APS-C sensor, for example the 400D (EOS Digital Rebel XTi) and the 40D. EF-S lenses can be distinguished by a white dot on the mount ring, as opposed to the red dot seen on standard EF lenses. Note that while an EF-S lens cannot be mounted on a camera that uses the EF mount, EF lenses can be mounted on cameras designed for the EF-S standard: for this reason, EF-S cameras carry both a red dot and a white dot on the mount.

As noted above under focal length, Canon makes DSLRs with various sensor sizes, and all using the EF or EF-S lens mounts. This leads to the interesting phenomenon of the same EF lens providing different angles of view depending on which camera it is mounted on.

Third-party lenses compatible with Canon's EF and EF-S mounts are manufactured by Sigma, Tamron, Tokina and Zeiss. The manufacturers of these lenses have reverse engineered the electronics of the EF lens mount. The use of these lenses is not supported by Canon. However, many users find these lenses to be cheaper (with the exception of Zeiss), and sometimes superior alternatives to Canon lenses.

=== Four Thirds mount ===
The Four Thirds System was created by Olympus and Kodak in 2001, and is designed exclusively for digital cameras. It is a semi-open standard that may be licensed by third parties. Currently Olympus, Leica (in cooperation with Panasonic), and Sigma are making lenses under Four Thirds System consortium licensing.

The Four Thirds System sensor size (17.3 mm x 13 mm) is the smallest currently being used in DSLR cameras. This leads to both advantages (theoretically smaller, lighter and cheaper lenses and camera bodies) and disadvantages (slightly lower image quality, especially in low-light situations).

There are currently over 35 lenses available for Four Thirds System cameras. A complete list can be found on Andrzej Wrotniak's web site.

=== Micro Four Thirds mount ===
Micro Four Thirds is a variant on the standard Four Thirds system, developed by Olympus and Panasonic. While mirrorless cameras are technically not DSLRs, they are similar in operation, and use similar interchangeable lenses. The Micro Four Thirds lens mount is a slightly modified version of the standard Four Thirds mount, and a number of lenses have been built for it. Because the lack of a mirror, optical viewfinder, and a shorter flange-focal distance these lenses can be more compact than those for standard Four Thirds.

Standard Four Thirds lenses can be used on a Micro Four Thirds camera with full electronic communication using an adapter, but those that do not support contrast-detect autofocus will only autofocus slowly, if at all. Micro Four Thirds lenses can not be used on a standard Four Thirds camera.

=== Minolta/Konica Minolta/Sony A-mount ===
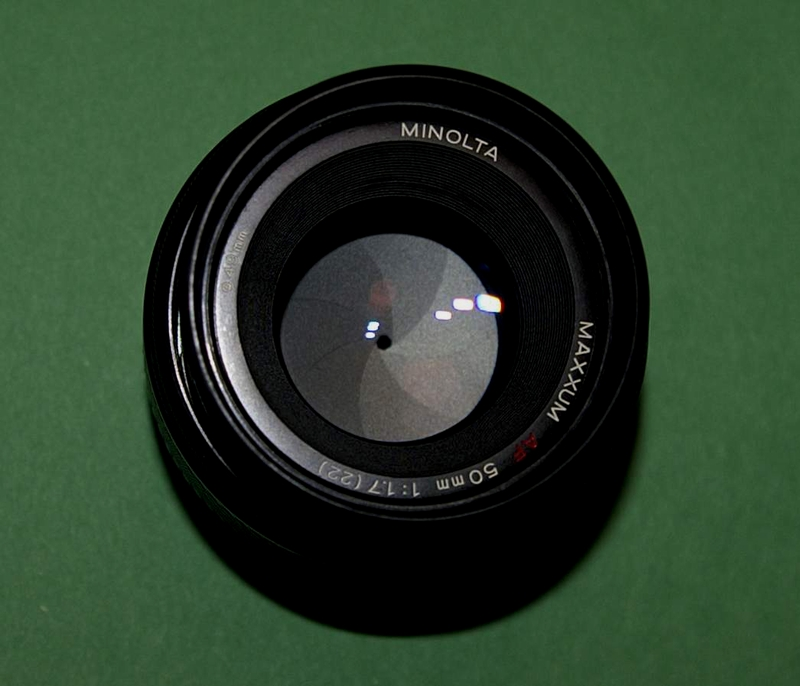
A Minolta Maxxum AF 50mm f/1.7 prime lens with type “A” bayonet mount with the aperture fully closed at F22

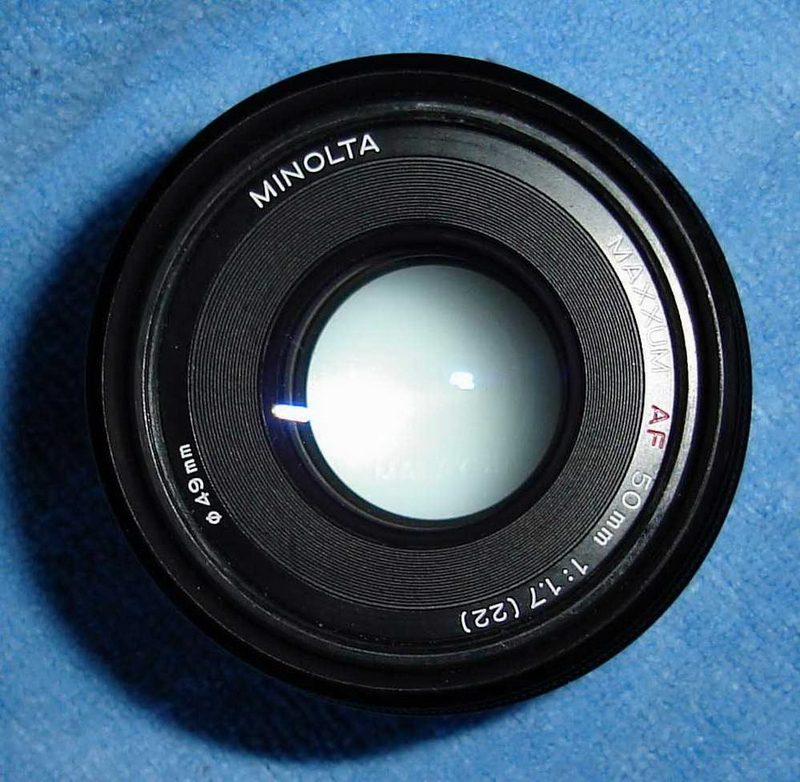
The same Minolta AF 50mm f/1.7 prime lens with the aperture all the way open at F1.7

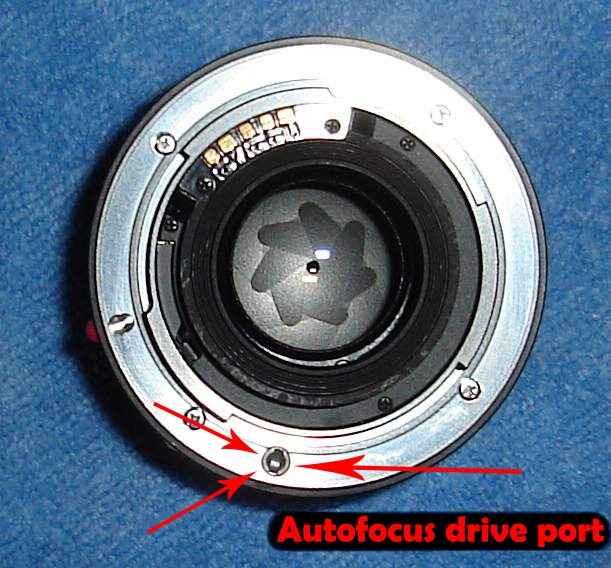
Rear view of Minolta Maxxum/Dynax lens showing the port for the external autofocus drive

The Minolta A-mount system was introduced with the Minolta Maxxum 7000 camera in 1985, along with 11 AF-mount lenses.

In North America, Minolta began using the name 'Maxxum' for the SLR autofocus cameras, lenses and flashes while in Europe they were called 'AF' (first series) and 'Dynax' (second and later generations), and in Asia the 'α' (Alpha) branding was used, though they were otherwise identical in appearance and function - all of the equipment is 100% interchangeable regardless which of the names it carries.

Most Minolta A-mount compatible lenses, whether built by Minolta or one of the aftermarket lens manufacturers, are focused externally by a shaft connecting the autofocus computer and motor inside the camera body that mechanically connects to the internal focusing gears inside of the lens body. A couple of later Minolta lenses do have a built-in ultrasonic focus motor (SSM lenses), like other SLR and DSLR systems (i.e. Canon and Nikon), where the AF computer is inside the camera body and there is a digital interface connecting body to an electric motor and the focusing gears built into the lens body.

This shaft driven autofocus design has several benefits such as allowing for smaller and lighter lenses and also keeps the cost of lenses down because there are no internal focusing motors or digital interfaces built into the lens. Keeping the autofocus motors inside the camera body and as far away from the lens glass as possible, reduces vibration, an additional benefit. This highly reliable shaft-driven autofocus system was extremely successful but is not seen in modern lenses.

Minolta (and later Konica Minolta) followed up by producing a large number of AF-mount lenses over the years up until 2004. Konica Minolta sold the rights to their Minolta AF lens mount to Sony in 2006.

Sony acquired Konica Minolta's camera technologies in 2006, and chose the "α" brand name, already in use by Minolta in Asia, for their new "Sony α" digital SLR system. The company has since abandoned traditional SLR design, and now uses the "α" brand name for its current line of SLT and ILCA cameras with fixed semi-reflective mirrors and electronic viewfinders, as well as its current line of E-mount mirrorless cameras.

The Minolta A-mount was retained from the old cameras and was originally named the "Sony α mount system".

Sony has produced several new lenses for its A-mount, and the current list of Minolta and Sony A-mount lenses has over 60 entries.

Some of the newest A-mount lenses are designated "DT" for Digital Technology; these are for digital cameras with APS-C sensors, and will result in vignetting if used on a film SLR or a full frame DSLR or full frame SLT camera.

Third-party lenses for the AF lens mount are made by Zeiss, Sigma, Tamron, Tokina and Vivitar.

=== Nikon F-mount ===
The Nikon F-mount was introduced by Nikon in 1959, and is thus one of the most venerable lens mounts still in existence. Another factor that makes the Nikon F-mount popular is that several other camera manufacturers, for example Fujifilm, have adopted it. F-mount photographic lenses are currently made by Nikon, Zeiss, Voigtländer, Schneider, Sigma, Tokina, Tamron, Hartblei, Kiev-Arsenal, Lensbaby, Vivitar, and others, and over 400 lenses are compatible with the system.

Most Nikon F-mount lenses cover the standard 36×24 mm area of 135 film, while "DX" designated lenses cover the 24×16 mm area of the Nikon DX format DSLR sensors, commonly referred to as APS-C format. While "DX" lenses can be physically mounted on any Nikon film or digital SLR that support the "AI" exposure indexing feature (produced from 1977), there will be some degree of vignetting when used on film cameras, depending on zoom setting. All Nikon full-frame "FX" DSLRs have a DX-compatible mode that, by default when a DX-format lens is attached, crops the captured frames to the DX format and adjusts the viewfinder to reflect the smaller capture area. This can be overridden by the user if desired.

There are basically three types of F mount Nikon lens:

1. MF = Manual focus lenses
2. AF & AF-D = Auto focus by camera body driven focus motor, the D version provides distance information
3. AF-I & AF-S = Auto focus by integrated/ultrasonic motor in lens; see also List of Nikon F-mount lenses with integrated autofocus motors

Industrial F-mount lenses have varying, often small, film/sensor coverage. Older F-mount lenses designed for film cameras will work on modern SLR or DSLR cameras with some limitations, typically not providing autofocus or automatic aperture setting. Entry level Nikon DSLRs such as Nikon D40, D40X, D60, D3000, D3100, D5000 and D5100 do not have an integrated focus motor, so they will not autofocus with AF & AF-D lenses. Similarly, some AF-I & AF-S lenses will not work on some older Nikon AF film SLRs.

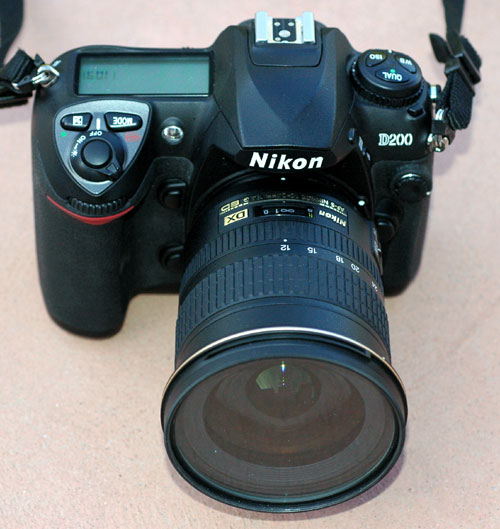
Nikon D200 DSLR

=== Nikon 1-mount ===
The Nikon 1-mount was announced on 21 September 2011 together with the Nikon 1 series high-speed mirrorless interchangeable-lens cameras.

=== Pentax K-mount ===
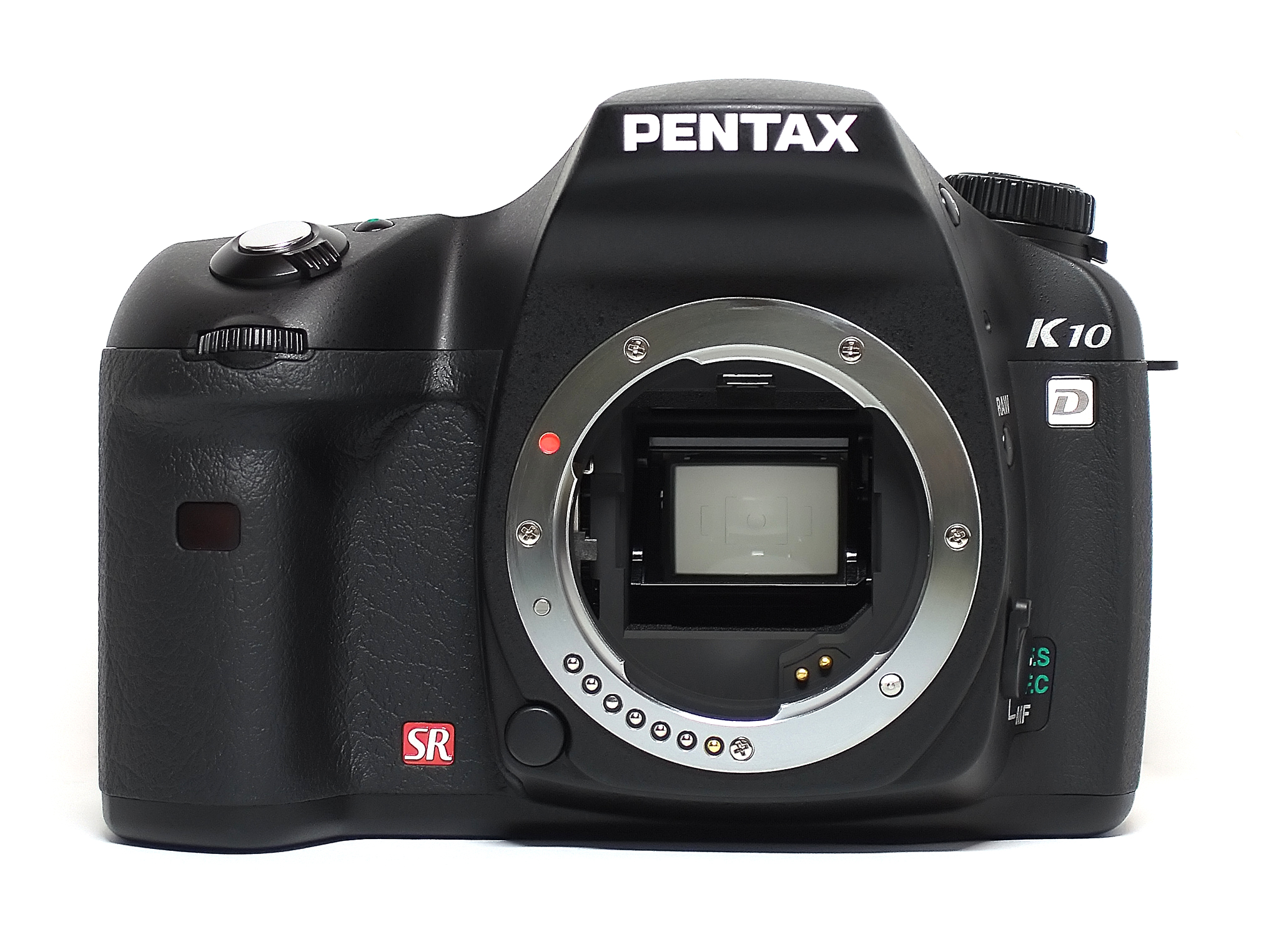
Pentax K10D "Crippled" K_{AF2} mount

The Pentax K-mount (or just "PK mount") was created by Pentax in 1975, and has been used by all Pentax 35 mm and digital SLRs since. The mount has been developed over the years, resulting in a large number of designations such as K_{F} mount, K_{A} mount, K_{AF} mount, K_{AF2} mount and K_{A2} mount, plus a couple of more recent versions that are not completely backward-compatible and are thus referred to as "crippled" versions. ("Crippled" in this context does not imply any lack of modern functionality, just a lack of compatibility with past lenses.) For more information see the Pentax K mount article or Bojidar Dimitrov's web site.

A number of other manufacturers have produced K-mount lenses, and several other manufacturers (such as Konica and Ricoh) have made K-mount cameras. In 2005 Pentax and Samsung entered into a cooperation resulting in the Samsung GX line of DSLRs, based largely on Pentax technology including the Pentax K mount.

=== Sigma SA-mount ===
Sigma Corporation, better known for manufacturing lenses for other cameras, has made some film SLR and DSLR cameras themselves. These cameras use the Sigma SA-mount, for which Sigma makes a line of lenses.

The Sigma DSLR cameras that use the SA mount are the Sigma SD9, SD10, SD14, SD15 and SD1 Merrill. These cameras are noteworthy for their use of the Foveon X3 sensor, an image sensor that works on quite different principles from the sensors used in all other digital cameras.

=== Mount compatibility across camera generations ===
The Nikon F-mount lens systems and the Pentax K-mount systems are the only 35 mm SLR camera systems (apart from the Leica M-mount rangefinder system) that allow a photographer to use a mechanical SLR camera body, a fully automatic SLR camera body, and a DSLR camera body, all utilizing the same lenses. The only aspects of these manufacturers' lenses that have changed are the addition of electronic contacts, autofocus abilities and, in some cases, the elimination of the external aperture ring for electronic control (i.e., Nikon's 'G-type' auto-Nikkors, which cannot be used on a mechanical SLR camera body).

Canon, Minolta (Sony), Olympus, and other manufacturers have changed lens mounts. Much older Canon film cameras used the FD lens mount, which was discontinued in 1987 in favor of the EF lens mount. Olympus discontinued the OM lens mount for the OM series cameras in favor of the Four Thirds System lens mount. However, due to the size of the Four Thirds mount it is possible to fit legacy SLR lenses from any manufacturer using an adapter, albeit with manual aperture and focus control. Minolta (Sony after 2006) phased out its bayonet-mount MC and MD Rokkor lenses for a modified bayonet mount (supporting autofocus) in 1985. All Minolta A-mount lenses work on compatible Minolta SLR film bodies and on Sony A-mount DSLR and SLT bodies.

== Automatic focus ==
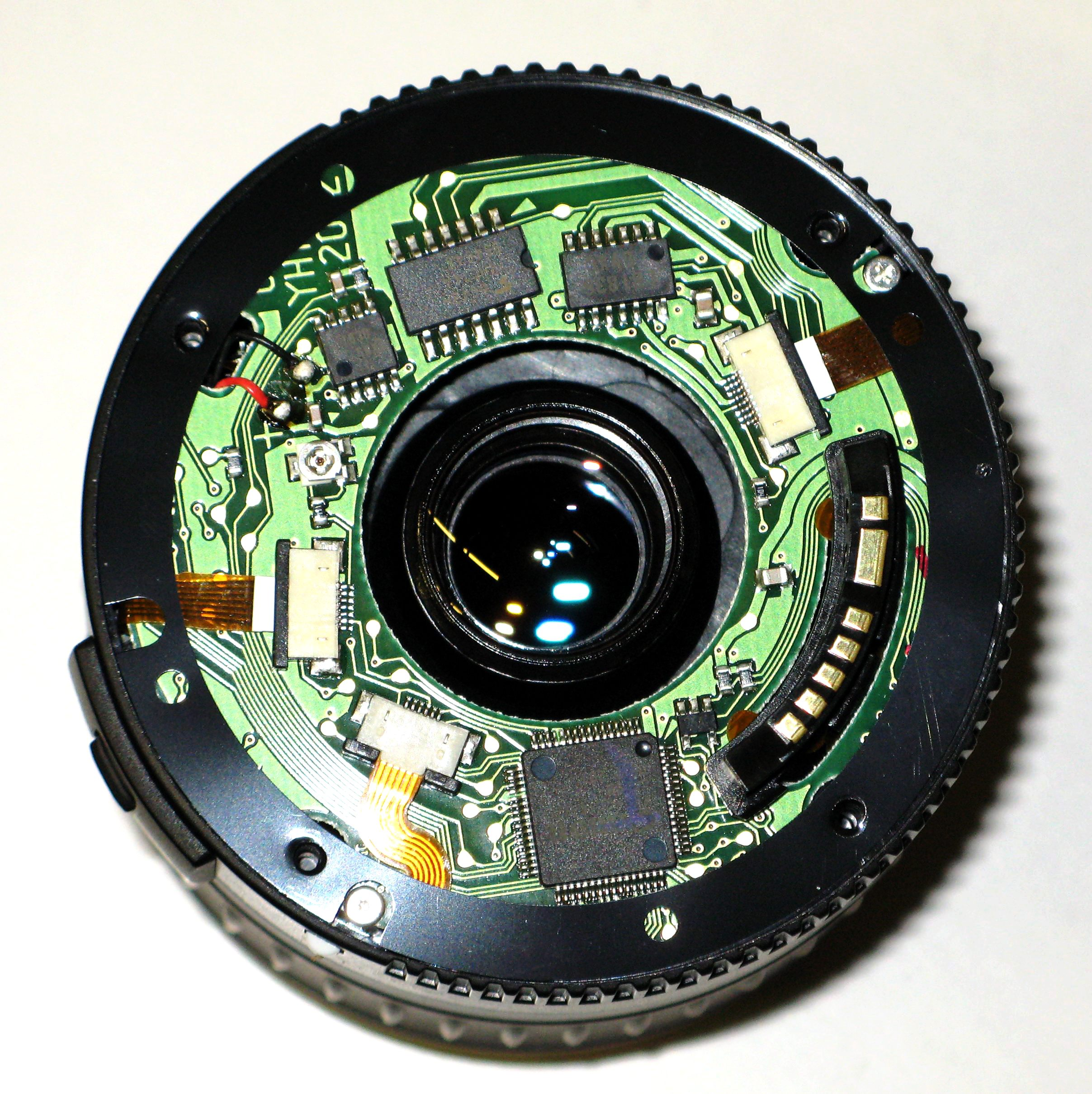
Electronics of a Canon EF-S lens

Almost all modern lenses for SLRs and DSLRs provide automatic focus. The autofocus sensor(s) and electronics are actually in the camera body, and this circuitry provides electrical power and signals to a motor inside the lens that adjusts the focus. (Some older autofocus systems are based on a motor in the camera body and using a mechanical connection to the focus mechanism in the lens.)

There are two different kinds of in-lens electronic focus drive motors currently in use, the traditional servo motor and the more modern "ultrasonic" drive systems. These ultrasonic drives go by different names according to the manufacturer, for example USM (Canon), AF-S/Silent Wave (Nikon), Super Sonicwave Motor/SSM (Sony), Supersonic Wave Drive (Olympus), Extra Silent Motor (Panasonic/Leica), Supersonic Drive Motor (Pentax), and Hypersonic Motor/HSM (Sigma). These ultrasonic focus drives typically provide faster focusing than the non-ultrasonic drives, as well as being practically silent and using less battery power.

== Image stabilization ==
Image stabilization is a technique used to reduce image blur caused by the camera not being held steady. There are two kinds of image stabilization used in SLR and DSLR cameras and their lenses:

- In-body image stabilization is implemented by moving the image sensor in an attempt to counteract the sensed motion of the camera. The advantage of this technique is that it works for all lenses mounted on the camera, at least if the camera electronics are aware of the lens' focal length. This is most commonly done automatically, but some cameras (such as all Olympus bodies with IS) allow the user to input the focal length manually for use with lenses with no electronic coupling. In-body image stabilization is used in modern Olympus, Sony, and Pentax cameras.
- In-lens image stabilization, also known as optical image stabilization, is implemented in the lens itself and moves the lens elements in an attempt to counteract the sensed motion of the camera. The inherent advantage of this kind of image stabilization is that it steadies the viewfinder image, allowing for more accurate framing and autofocus. The disadvantage is that you have to pay the extra cost for every lens you buy for which you want image stabilization. Panasonic, Canon, and Nikon use lens-based image stabilization. Some third-party lenses from Sigma and Tamron also have lens-based IS systems.

Modern advanced cameras that feature in-body image stabilization often have the ability to utilize in-body and in-lens stabilization simultaneously when a supported lens is attached.

The effectiveness of image stabilization systems varies somewhat from one implementation to another, but there seems to be no inherent superiority to either lens-based or sensor-based systems as far as the actual improvement in captured images.

Modest image stabilization systems can degrade image quality if the photographer is intentionally panning (as the system tries to negate the panning motion), or if the camera is mounted on a very sturdy tripod (the system drifts around slowly due to spurious measurements over the course of a long exposure). Some more recent IS systems can automatically detect these situations and disable the IS along the panning axis, or disable it completely if the camera is on a tripod. Sweep panoramic photography certainly use panning system. So, modern image stabilization system is not use 2 axis anymore, but up to 5 axis: horizontal axis, vertical axis and rotation of 3 axis.

Mounting a lens with optical image stabilization on a camera with in-body image stabilization does not provide improved results, since the combined effect of both systems will "overcorrect". Users of image-stabilized lenses on bodies with sensor-shift IS should determine which system offers superior performance and turn the other off. But, in-lens image stabilization usually better than in-body image stabilization, if the lens is newer than the body.

== See also ==
- Afocal photography
- History of the single-lens reflex camera
- Comparison of digital and film photography
- List of photographic equipment makers
- Teleside converter
- List of Nikon F-mount lenses with integrated autofocus motor
