= Richard B. Merrill =

American inventor, engineer, and photographer

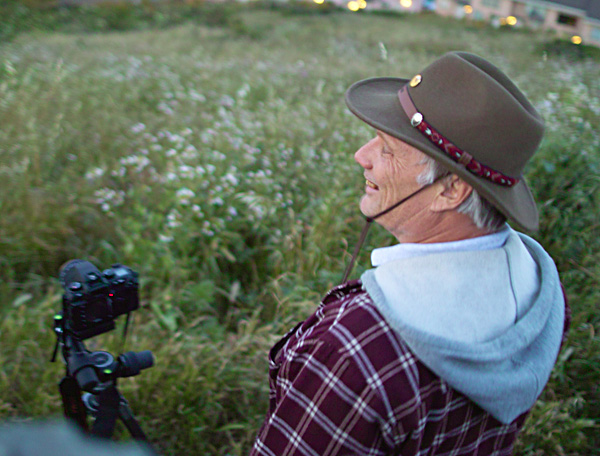
Dick Merrill was an avid photographer.

Richard Billings Merrill (1949–2008), a.k.a. Dick Merrill, was an American inventor, engineer, and photographer.

Merrill was born in New York City, the son of Dr. Frederick Hamilton Merrill and Joan Williams Merrill. He was the adoptive grandson of Richard Billings (son of Frederick H. Billings), and the grandson of Norman Williams of the family that donated the library in Woodstock, Vermont.

He was married in 1996 to Sengchanh (Seng) Phomphanh. They made their home in Woodside, California.

Merrill earned a master's degree in electrical engineering from Dartmouth College, and worked for National Semiconductor from 1980.

He was a founder of Foveon in 1997, and worked there until his death from cancer in 2008. He invented the "vertical color filter" technology of the Foveon X3 sensor that is at the heart of the novel digital cameras sold by Sigma Corporation (the SD9, SD10, SD14, DP1, DP2 and DP3).

Merrill's vertical color filter invention was originally based on a triple-well CMOS DRAM process. He later refined the idea using multiple epitaxially grown silicon layers for each of the vertically stacked color-detecting photodiodes.

Merrill shared the Royal Photographic Society's Progress Medal in 2005 with Dick Lyon and Carver Mead for the development of the Foveon X3 technology. Shortly before his death in 2008, he received the Kosar Memorial Award, "for significant contributions to an unconventional photographic system," from the Society for Imaging Science and Technology.

According to Carver Mead, Merrill was "the most creative engineer I have ever met." Merrill explained his inventive process this way, "There's a lot you can get in this world just by looking for symmetry, looking for patterns;" and "Look for a technological trend in one area and apply it to another."

On February 8, 2012, Merrill was honored by business partner Sigma Corporation by renaming Sigma's flagship DSLR SD1 to SD1 Merrill. Sigma SD1 utilizes the latest Foveon image sensor.
