= Sigma DP1s =

2009 APS-C digital compact camera

Overview
- Maker: Sigma
- Type: Large sensor fixed-lens camera

Lens
- Lens: 28mm equivalent

Sensor/medium
- Sensor type: Foveon X3 (CMOS)
- Sensor size: 20.7 x 13.8mm (APS-C type)
- Maximum resolution: 2652 × 1768 × 3 (14.1 million effective pixels, 4.69 megapixel output image size)
- Film speed: 100-800
- Recording medium: SD/MMC card

Shutter
- Shutter speeds: 1/4000s to 30s

Image processing
- White balance: No

General
- LCD screen: 2.5 inches with 230,000 dots
- Dimensions: 109 x 60 x 31mm (4.29 x 2.36 x 1.22 inches)
- Weight: 270 g (10 oz) including battery

The Sigma DP1s is a high-end compact digital camera introduced by the Sigma Corporation as an improvement of the Sigma DP1. It features a 14-megapixel Foveon X3 sensor (2652 × 1768 × 3 layers), a fixed 16.6 mm F4.0 lens (28mm equivalent), a 2.5" LCD and a pop-up flash.

The Sigma DP1s is a large sensor digital compact camera announced by Sigma on October 2, 2009.

The Sigma DP1s was announced on November 17, 2009. The enhancements are related to the user interface and the shooting of backlit subjects and reddish unbalanced pictures. The user interface introduces the Quick Step function (originally introduced in SD14) that allows easy and quick modification of the main parameters. The picture quality is improved when shooting backlit subjects. The DP1 suffered from a high sensitivity to red light which has been corrected in the DP1s.

The Sigma DP1s was succeeded by the Sigma DP1x model.

== Specification ==
The DP1s is very similar to the DP1.

Image Sensor	Foveon X3 (CMOS with layered photodiodes)
Image Sensor Size	20.7 × 13.8mm
Number of Pixels	Effective pixels approx. 14.06 MP (2652 × 1768 × 3 layers)
Aspect Ratio	3 : 2, 16 : 9
Lens	16.6mm f/4 (35mm equivalent focal length：28mm)
Lens Construction	5 groups, 6 elements
Shooting Range	30 cm～∞
Storage Media	Secure Digital (SD) card / SDHC compatible / MMC
Recording Format	Exif 2.21, DCF 2.0, DPOF
Recording Mode	Lossless compression RAW data (12-bit), JPEG (High, Medium, Low), Movie, Voice memo to still images, Voice recording
White Balance	8 types (Auto, Sunlight, Shade, Overcast, Incandescent, Fluorescent, Flash, Custom)
Auto Focus	Contrast-detection type
AF Point	9-Points
Focusing Modes	Single, 9-points multi
AF Point Selection	Auto and manual selection
Focus Lock	Shutter release halfway-down position(AF lock can be done by AE lock button from menu setting)
Manual Focus	Focus aid (dial type)
Metering System	8 segments evaluative metering, Center Metering, Center-Weighted Average Metering
Exposure Control System	Auto Mode, (P) Program AE, (S) Shutter Priority AE, (A) Aperture Priority AE, (M) Manual
ISO	50, 100, 200, 400, 800, Auto (100-200 and 100-400 when flash)
Exposure Compensation	±3EV (1/3 stop increments)
Auto Bracketing	Appropriate, under, over; 1/3EV steps up to ±3EV for appropriate exposure
Shutter Speed	1/2000sec. to 15sec. (1/2000 only with f11)
Built-in Flash	Pop-up type (manually)
Flash Coverage Range	30 cm-2.1m (at ISO200)
External Flash Sync.	Hotshoe (X-sync contact)
Drive Modes	[1] Single, [2] Continuous, [3] Self Timer (2sec. /10sec.)
LCD Monitor	TFT Color LCD Monitor
Monitor Size	2.5 inches
LCD Pixels	approx. 230,000 pixels
LCD Monitor Language	English/Japanese/German/Chinese/French/Spanish/Italian/Chinese (Simplified)/Korean
Interface	USB (USB2.0), video out (NTSC/PAL), audio out (monaural)
Power	Li-ion battery pack BP-31, battery charger BC-31, AC adapter (optional)
Dimensions	113.3mm/4.5" (W) × 59.5mm /2.3"(H) × 50.3mm/2" (D)
Weight	240g /8.5oz (excluding batteries)

== See also ==
- Sigma DP1
- Foveon
- List of large sensor fixed-lens cameras

Type	Lens	2002	2003	2004	2005	2006	2007	2008	2009	2010	2011	2012	2013	2014	2015	2016	2017	2018	2019	2020	2021	2022	2023	2024	2025
MILC	Full frame																								
MILC	Full frame																	BF							
MILC	Full frame																	fp L							
MILC	Full frame																	fp							
MILC	APS-H															SD Quattro H									
MILC	APS-C															SD Quattro									
Compact (Prime lens)	Wide														dp0 Quattro										
Compact (Prime lens)	Wide							DP1		DP1s	DP1x		DP1 Merrill		dp1 Quattro										
Compact (Prime lens)	Normal								DP2	DP2s	DP2x		DP2 Merrill	dp2 Quattro											
Compact (Prime lens)	Tele												DP3 Merrill	dp3 Quattro											
DSLR	APS-C	SD9		SD10				SD14		SD15		SD1	SD1 Merrill												
