= Sigma DP1 =

2008 APS-C digital compact camera

The Sigma DP1 was a high-end compact digital camera introduced by the Sigma Corporation. It featured a 14-megapixel Foveon X3 sensor (2652 × 1768 × 3 layers), a fixed 16.6 mm F4.0 lens (28mm equivalent), a 2.5-inch (64 mm) LCD and a pop-up flash. It was the first "compact" camera that featured an APS-C sized sensor, a feature that Sigma claimed would result in DSLR quality images from a small, pocketable camera.

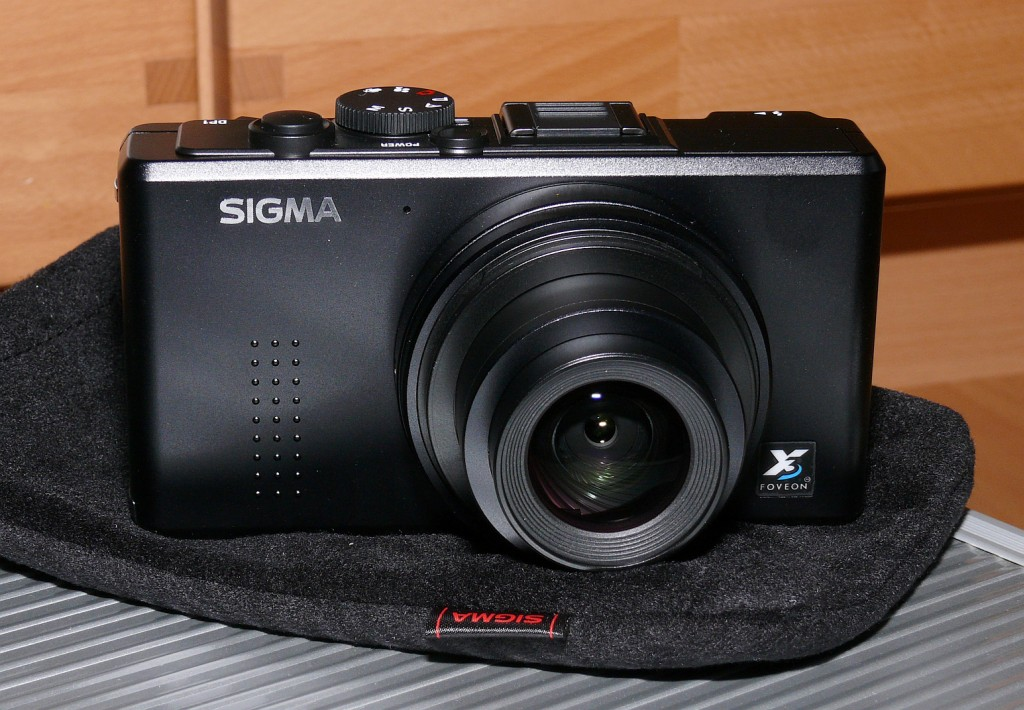
Front of the Sigma DP1

It was first announced on September 26, 2006, and after several production delays was delivered in the spring of 2008. A follow-up camera, the Sigma DP2, was released in 2009; it featured a different lens, and was sold contemporaneously with the DP1. An improved version called Sigma DP1S was announced on November 17, 2009.

== Reviews ==
It has been praised for innovation (large sensor in compact body) and class-leading detail at ISO 100 – best image quality in a compact camera, in the same class as DSLRs, and suited for daylight landscape and architecture photography – but criticized for poor low-light performance and slow speed, summarized as "a great concept that needs a considerable amount of additional work". The user interface has also been criticized.

== Specification ==
Image Sensor	Foveon X3 (CMOS with layered photodiodes)
Image Sensor Size	20.7 × 13.8mm
Number of Pixels	2652 × 1768 × 3 (14.1 million effective pixels, 4.69 megapixel output image size)
Aspect Ratio	3 : 2, 16 : 9
Lens	16.6mm f/4 (35mm equivalent focal length：28mm)
Lens Construction	5 groups, 6 elements
Shooting Range	30cm～∞
Storage Media	Secure Digital (SD) card / SDHC compatible
Recording Format	Exif 2.21, DCF 2.0, DPOF
Recording Mode	Lossless compression raw data (12-bit), JPEG (High, Medium, Low), Movie, Voice memo to still images, Voice recording
White Balance	8 types (Auto, Sunlight, Shade, Overcast, Incandescent, Fluorescent, Flash, Custom)
Auto Focus	Contrast-detection type
AF Point	9-Points
Focusing Modes	Single, 9-points multi
AF Point Selection	Auto and manual selection
Focus Lock	Shutter release halfway-down position(AF lock can be done by AE lock button from menu setting)
Manual Focus	Focus aid (dial type)
Metering System	8 segments evaluative metering, Center Metering, Center-Weighted Average Metering
Exposure Control System	Auto Mode, (P) Program AE, (S) Shutter Priority AE, (A) Aperture Priority AE, (M) Manual
Exposure Compensation	±3EV (1/3 stop increments)
Auto Bracketing	Appropriate, under, over; 1/3EV steps up to ±3EV for appropriate exposure
Shutter Speed	1/2000sec. to 15sec.
ISO sensitivity range	ISO equivalency 50-800
Built-in Flash	Pop-up type (manually)
Flash Coverage Range	30cm-2.1m(at ISO200)
External Flash Sync.	Hotshoe (X-sync contact)
Drive Modes	[1] Single, [2] Continuous, [3] Self Timer(2sec. /10sec.)
LCD Monitor	TFT Color LCD Monitor
Monitor Size	2.5 inches
LCD Pixels	approx. 230,000 pixels
LCD Monitor Language	English/Japanese/German/Chinese/French/Spanish/Italian/Chinese (Simplified)/Korean
Interface	USB (USB2.0), video out (NTSC/PAL), audio out (monaural)
Power	Li-ion battery pack BP-31, battery charger BC-31, AC adapter (optional)
Dimensions	113.3mm/4.5" (W) × 59.5mm /2.3"(H) × 50.3mm/2" (D)
Weight	250g /8.8oz (excluding batteries)

== Developments ==
In February 2012 it was announced by Sigma Corporation that an updated version of both the DP1 and DP2 series, to be known as DP1 Merrill and DP2 Merrill, will incorporate the updated 46 MP Foveon sensor of the SD1, resulting in substantially greater image detail.

Another notable change of the 'Merrill' DP cameras is the focus ring is now in the traditional location around the lens barrel.

Available in March 2013, the Sigma DP3 Merrill has 46MP with 50mm f2.8 (75mm in 35mm film format) and a new Face Detection autofocus.

== See also ==
- Sigma DP2
- Sigma SD9
- Sigma SD10
- Sigma SD14
- List of large sensor fixed-lens cameras

Type	Lens	2002	2003	2004	2005	2006	2007	2008	2009	2010	2011	2012	2013	2014	2015	2016	2017	2018	2019	2020	2021	2022	2023	2024	2025
MILC	Full frame																								
MILC	Full frame																	BF							
MILC	Full frame																	fp L							
MILC	Full frame																	fp							
MILC	APS-H															SD Quattro H									
MILC	APS-C															SD Quattro									
Compact (Prime lens)	Wide														dp0 Quattro										
Compact (Prime lens)	Wide							DP1		DP1s	DP1x		DP1 Merrill		dp1 Quattro										
Compact (Prime lens)	Normal								DP2	DP2s	DP2x		DP2 Merrill	dp2 Quattro											
Compact (Prime lens)	Tele												DP3 Merrill	dp3 Quattro											
DSLR	APS-C	SD9		SD10				SD14		SD15		SD1	SD1 Merrill												
