= Sigma SD15 =

Digital camera model

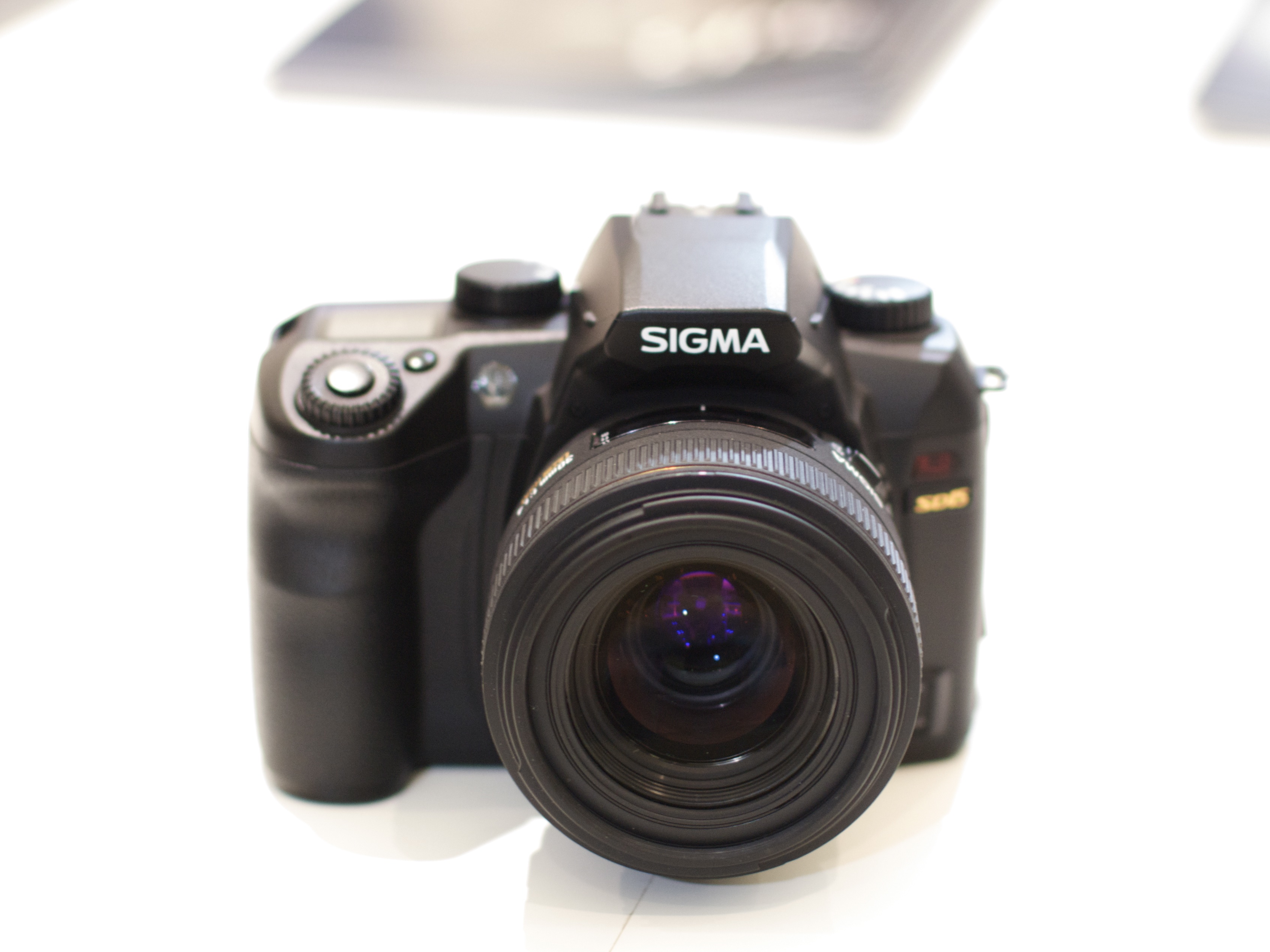

Overview
- Maker: Sigma Corporation
- Type: Digital single-lens reflex

Lens
- Lens: Interchangeable (Sigma SA mount)

Sensor/medium
- Sensor: 20.7 mm × 13.8 mm Foveon X3 sensor
- Maximum resolution: 2652 × 1768 × 3 (14.1 million effective pixels, 4.69 megapixel output image size)
- Film speed: 100–1600 in 1 EV steps, 50 and 3200 in extended mode
- Storage media: SD card

Focusing
- Focus modes: One-shot, Continuous, Manual
- Focus areas: 5 points, cross pattern

Exposure/metering
- Exposure modes: Programmed, shutter-priority, aperture priority, manual
- Exposure metering: TTL, full aperture, zones
- Metering modes: 77 segment evaluative, Center Area, C/Wgt Average

Flash
- Flash: pop-up, sync at 1/180 second

Shutter
- Shutter: electronic focal-plane
- Shutter speed range: 30 s to 1/4000 s, 2 min to 1/4000 s in extended mode
- Continuous shooting: up to 3.0 frame/s

Viewfinder
- Viewfinder: Optical, pentaprism

Image processing
- White balance: 6 presets, auto, and custom

General
- LCD screen: 3-inch (76.2 mm), 460,000 pixels
- Battery: 1500 mAhr 7.2 V Li-ion rechargeable
- Weight: 680 g (24 oz) (body only)

The Sigma SD15 is an updated version of Sigma SD14 DSLR produced by the Sigma Corporation of Japan and featuring the improved TRUE II image processing engine, but with the same image sensor as its predecessor. As such, the SD15 features the 4.7 MP Foveon X3 sensor. After having showcased the camera in photokina 2008 and officially introduced during PMA 2010, it finally began shipping in June 2010. It is Sigma's fourth DSLR since the SD9 from 2002.

There is some dispute over the 15.0 MP claim made by Sigma, resulting from the major differences between the industry standard Bayer sensor used in all other digital cameras, and the Foveon X3 full-color image sensor used almost exclusively in Sigma cameras. Since the Foveon sensor captures images via a three-layer red, green, blue silicone array similar to the three-layer technology used in Technicolor film, rather than the single-layer color interpolation method used by Bayer sensors, Sigma and Foveon count each RGB layer separately, so 4.7 MP times 3 translates to their 15.0 MP claims.

== Differences with the SD14 ==
While the SD15 retains the image sensor from its predecessor, it includes the improved TRUE II image processing engine that was already implemented in the Sigma DP2. Sigma claims that the new engine offers better quality with a faster processing speed while suppressing noise through a newly developed proprietary algorithm. The combination also offers a one-stop higher ISO range compared to the SD14, though the often desaturated rendition of natural green and oversaturation of blue has been retained.

The SD15 also features a larger, higher resolution LCD screen. The SD15 also introduced Color Modes. The storage medium was changed from a CF card to an SD card.

Type	Lens	2002	2003	2004	2005	2006	2007	2008	2009	2010	2011	2012	2013	2014	2015	2016	2017	2018	2019	2020	2021	2022	2023	2024	2025
MILC	Full frame																								
MILC	Full frame																	BF							
MILC	Full frame																	fp L							
MILC	Full frame																	fp							
MILC	APS-H															SD Quattro H									
MILC	APS-C															SD Quattro									
Compact (Prime lens)	Wide														dp0 Quattro										
Compact (Prime lens)	Wide							DP1		DP1s	DP1x		DP1 Merrill		dp1 Quattro										
Compact (Prime lens)	Normal								DP2	DP2s	DP2x		DP2 Merrill	dp2 Quattro											
Compact (Prime lens)	Tele												DP3 Merrill	dp3 Quattro											
DSLR	APS-C	SD9		SD10				SD14		SD15		SD1	SD1 Merrill												
