= SD10 =

SD10 may refer to:

- SD-10 (missile), an air-to-air missile
- PowerShot SD10, an ultracompact digital camera produced by Canon
- Sigma SD10, a digital SLR camera
- South Dakota Highway 10, a state highway in South Dakota
- SD-10 (siren) a siren made by Federal Signal.
- EMD SD10, an American diesel locomotive produced by Electro-Motive Diesel.
