= Sigma mount =

Sigma mount may refer to:

- Sigma SA-mount (SA), an auto-focus SLR camera mount with inner (SA-IB) and outer (SA-OB) bayonets introduced by Sigma in 1992
- Sigma K-mount, the Pentax K-compatible mount used for the Sigma SA-1 35mm SLR in 1983
- M42 screw lens mount, the 35mm mount used for the manual-focus SLR Sigma Mark-I in 1976
