= SD14 =

SD14 can refer to:

- Sigma SD14 digital single-lens reflex camera produced by the Sigma Corporation of Japan
- The SD14 cargo ship built by Austin & Pickersgill
