= Canon PowerShot Pro1 =

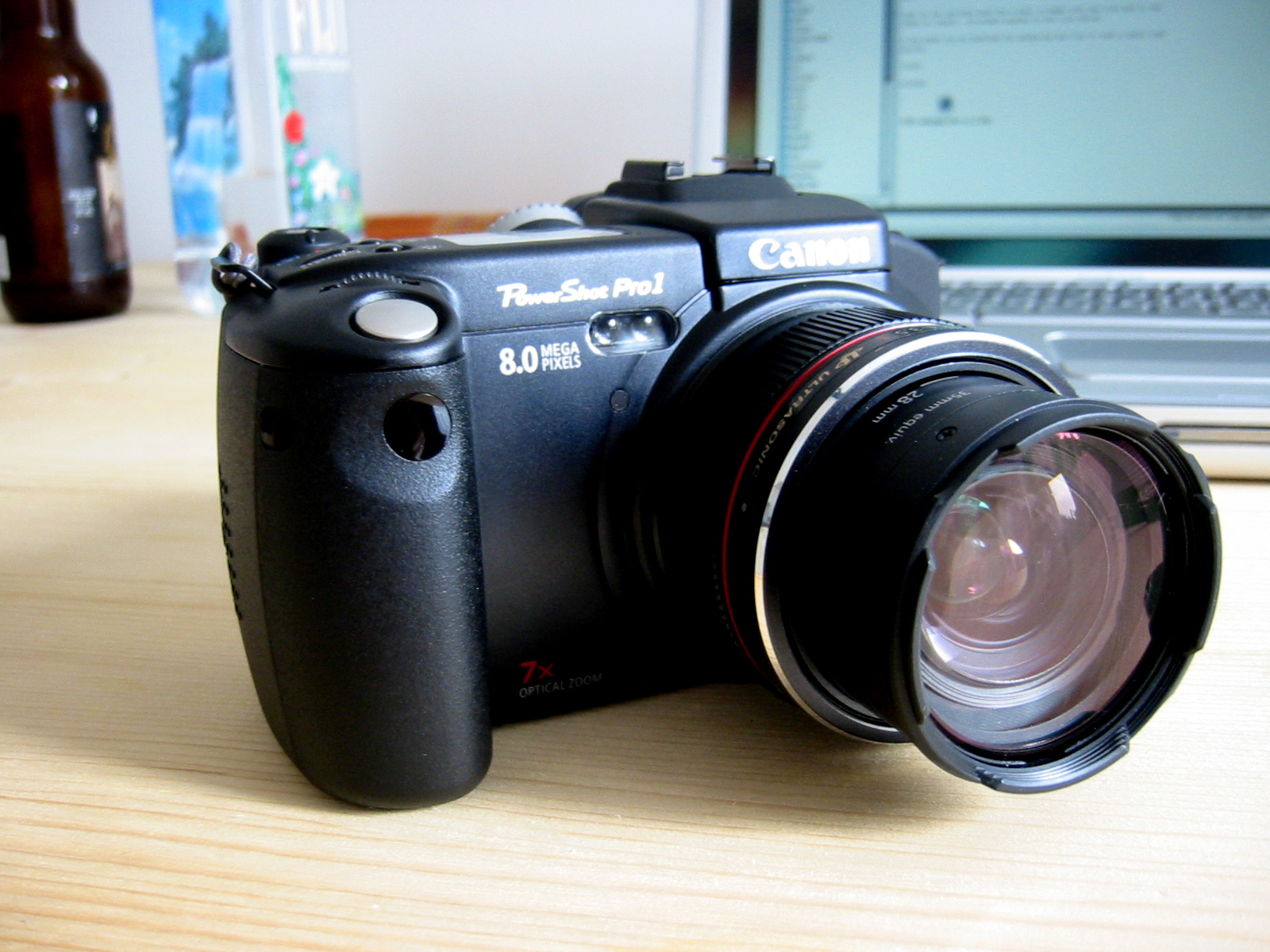

Overview
- Maker: Canon Inc.
- Type: Bridge digital camera

Lens
- Lens: fixed, 7× optical zoom "L-series", 7.2 – 50.8 mm (28 – 200 mm equiv.), f/2.4-3.5, USM

Sensor/medium
- Sensor: 2/3 in (17 mm) type, 8.8 mm × 6.6 mm Sony CCD
- Maximum resolution: 3264 × 2448 (8.0 megapixels)
- Film speed: 50–400
- Storage media: CompactFlash (CF) (Type I or Type II) and MicroDrive (MD)

Focusing
- Focus modes: One-shot, AI Servo, AI-Focus, Manual
- Focus areas: 1 user point, Single/Continuous, Manual
- Focus bracketing: yes

Exposure/metering
- Exposure modes: Full auto, programmed, shutter-priority, aperture priority, manual
- Exposure metering: TTL, full aperture, zones
- Metering modes: Evaluative, Center-weighted average, Spot (center or AF area)

Flash
- Flash: Built-in, pop-up (electronic), Auto, Manual on/off
- Flash bracketing: none

Shutter
- Shutter: electronic focal-plane
- Shutter speed range: 15 – 1/4000 s
- Continuous shooting: up to 2.5 frame/s, up to 6 frames

Viewfinder
- Viewfinder: Electronic, 235,000 pixels, 100% coverage

Image processing
- White balance: 6 presets, Auto and custom
- WB bracketing: none

General
- LCD screen: 2.0 in (51 mm), 235,000 pixels, 100% coverage, Vari-Angle
- Battery: Li-Ion BP-511A rechargeable
- Optional battery packs: BP-514, BP-512, BP-511, CA-560 AC adapter
- Weight: 545 g (19 oz) (body only)

The PowerShot Pro1 is a digital camera made by Canon, announced in February 2004 and was discontinued first quarter of 2006. It uses a Sony-built 2/3 in (17 mm) 8.3 megapixel CCD image sensor, which gives a usable image size of approximately 8.0 megapixels. It was the most expensive fixed-lens camera sold by Canon at the time, and thus the top of the PowerShot range. It was the first fixed lens designated a Canon L series lens, a designation normally reserved for the professional lines of their FD, EF, and RF lenses for interchangeable lens cameras.

It has a variable-angle two-inch, polycrystalline silicon, thin-film transistor, color liquid crystal display with approximately 235,000 pixels and a colour electronic viewfinder (EVF) with the same resolution. The lens has a zoom range of 7.2 to 50.8 mm, equivalent to 28 to 200 mm in 35 mm terms. The shutter has a maximum speed of 1/4,000 second. The camera's dimensions are 117.5 mm in width, 72 mm in height, and 90.3 mm in depth. Its mass is 545 g.

== See also ==
- List of digital cameras with CCD sensors
