= Sigma DP2 =

- Maker: Sigma Corporation

Lens
- Lens: 24.2 mm (35 mm equivalent 41 mm) f/2.8

Sensor/medium
- Sensor: 20.7 mm × 13.8 mm Foveon X3 Sensor CMOS
- Maximum resolution: 2652 × 1768 × 3 (14.1 million effective pixels, 4.69 megapixel output image size)
- Film speed: ISO equivalency 50-3200 1/3 EV Steps up to ±3EV
- Storage media: SD card

Focusing
- Focus areas: Contrast Detect AF

Exposure/metering
- Exposure modes: Program AE [P], Shutter Priority AE [S], Aperture Priority AE [Ae], Manual [M]
- Exposure metering: TTL Full Aperture Metering
- Metering modes: Evaluative Metering, Center-Weighted Average Metering, Spot Metering

Flash
- Flash: Pop-up (manual) Guide no. 6 (ISO100/m)

Shutter
- Shutter: Electronically controlled lens shutter
- Shutter speed range: 15 to 1/2000 seconds
- Continuous shooting: 3 frames/s, limited to 3 successive frames

Viewfinder
- Viewfinder: none

Image processing
- White balance: Auto, Presets (6), Custom

General
- LCD screen: 2.5 Inch, 230000 dots
- Battery: Lithium Ion battery BP-31
- Dimensions: 113.3 × 59.5 × 56.1 mm (4.5 × 2.3 × 2.2 inch)
- Weight: 260 g (9.2 oz) excluding battery & card
- Made in: Japan

The Sigma DP2 is a high-end compact digital camera introduced by the Sigma Corporation. It features a 14-megapixel Foveon X3 sensor (2652 × 1768 × 3 layers), the same sensor used in its predecessor, the Sigma DP1 and in the Sigma SD14 DSLR, a fixed 24.2 mm f/2.8 lens (41 mm equivalent), a 2.5” LCD and a pop-up flash.

With its predecessor, the DP1, it is one of the few "compact" cameras that featured sensor with a size equivalent to APS-C. Sigma claimed this (comparatively large) sensor size would result in DSLR quality images from a small, pocketable camera. The camera does not include auto or scene modes as it is not aimed against the average consumer. The DP series is therefore targeted against professional photographers or enthusiasts seeking a compact, yet capable camera.

It was announced in September 2008, and began shipping in 2009.

Differences to the DP1 include a lens that is one stop faster, f/2.8 vs. f/4.0, 24.2 vs. 16.6 mm (35 mm equivalent of 41 mm vs 28 mm) and a faster processing chip, the True II image processor, which is shared with the Sigma SD15 DSLR.

Though claimed difficult to use, it shares many features and limitations found in rangefinder cameras such as the Leica M6, and with its mechanical-feedback manual focus, snaps images with zero shutter lag.

In February 2010, Sigma released an updated version of the camera, the Sigma DP2s. The DP2s offers a new AF algorithm, a "power save" mode and a modified rear design with new labeling of the buttons. The imaging sensor itself remained the same.

In 2012, Sigma released the 'Merrill' range of the DP series, with a much improved sensor.

== See also ==
- List of large sensor fixed-lens cameras

Type	Lens	2002	2003	2004	2005	2006	2007	2008	2009	2010	2011	2012	2013	2014	2015	2016	2017	2018	2019	2020	2021	2022	2023	2024	2025
MILC	Full frame																								
MILC	Full frame																	BF							
MILC	Full frame																	fp L							
MILC	Full frame																	fp							
MILC	APS-H															SD Quattro H									
MILC	APS-C															SD Quattro									
Compact (Prime lens)	Wide														dp0 Quattro										
Compact (Prime lens)	Wide							DP1		DP1s	DP1x		DP1 Merrill		dp1 Quattro										
Compact (Prime lens)	Normal								DP2	DP2s	DP2x		DP2 Merrill	dp2 Quattro											
Compact (Prime lens)	Tele												DP3 Merrill	dp3 Quattro											
DSLR	APS-C	SD9		SD10				SD14		SD15		SD1	SD1 Merrill												
