= Foveon =

American manufacturer of image sensors

- Industry: Manufacturing
- Founded: 1997
- Defunct: 2008
- Fate: Acquired
- Successor: Sigma Corporation
- Headquarters: Santa Clara, California

Foveon, Inc., was an American company that manufactured and distributed image sensor technology. It made the Foveon X3 sensor, which captures images in some digital cameras.

Foveon was founded in 1997 and is based in Santa Clara, California. In 2008 it was bought by Sigma Corporation.

== Details ==
The company, founded in 1997 by Carver Mead, Richard Lyon, Richard B. Merrill, Richard Turner, Richard Nedwich, and others, was a spin-off of National Semiconductor and Synaptics. The founding directors were: Federico Faggin (president and CEO of Synaptics), Brian Halla (chairman, president/CEO of National Semiconductor), and Dick Sanquini (VP of National Semiconductor).

It was based in Santa Clara, California. Foveon was initially known for their high-end digital portrait camera systems built around a color-separation beam-splitter prism assembly. Later, the X3 pixel sensor became the company's main product. Both the prism system and the X3 technology derive their benefit from sampling all three primary colors at all pixel locations, instead of employing a Bayer pattern approach sampling a specific color at each pixel location.

Foveon was previously known as Foveonics. The name is derived from the fovea of the human eye, which enables sharp imaging while reading or watching television.

George Gilder wrote The Silicon Eye, which tells the story of Foveon and its founders.

On 11 November 2008, when Federico Faggin was the CEO, all shares of Foveon stock were acquired by Sigma Corporation. The company continued in a new location as a wholly owned portion of Sigma. At the end of 2020, the company ceased operations in Santa Clara and all further work was transferred to Sigma in Japan.
