= Sigma SD1 =

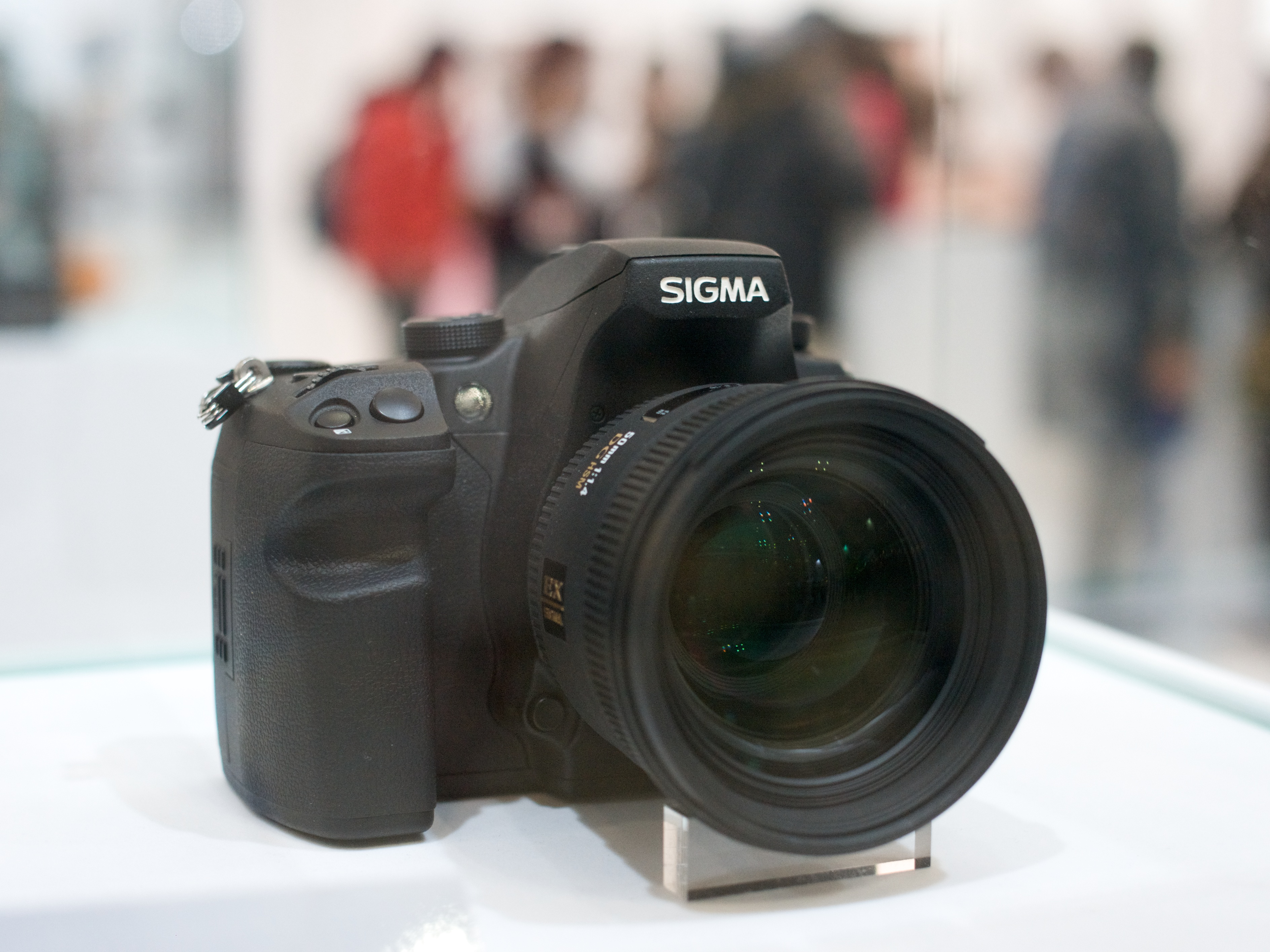
- Sigma SD1 with 50mm, f/1.4

Overview
- Maker: Sigma Corporation
- Type: Digital single-lens reflex
- Intro price: 9799 USD

Lens
- Lens: Interchangeable (Sigma SA mount)

Sensor/medium
- Sensor: 23.5×15.7mm APS-C 1.5x crop (Foveon X3)
- Maximum resolution: 4704 × 3136 × 3 (44.3 million effective pixels, 14.8 megapixel output image size)
- Film speed: 100–6400
- Storage media: CompactFlash (CF) Type I (Not microdrive or CF Type II)

Focusing
- Focus modes: Single AF, Continuous AF (with AF motion prediction function) and Manual
- Focus areas: 11-point twin-cross AF

Viewfinder
- Viewfinder: Optical, pentaprism

Image processing
- Image processor: True II Image processing engine

General
- LCD screen: 3 in (63 mm), 460,000 pixels
- Made in: Japan

The Sigma SD1 is a digital SLR camera produced by the Sigma Corporation of Japan. The camera uses a Foveon X3 sensor, which comprises 3 layers of 4800 x 3200 pixels (46 megapixels), giving much higher chromatic resolution than the equivalent Bayer array. It uses a Milbeaut image processor. The Foveon sensor does not use an aliasing filter, thus further improving the resolution.

The SD1 was announced by Sigma at photokina 2010 on September 21, 2010. It was officially put on sale in May 2011 at a RRP of nearly US$10,000.

== Sigma SD1 Merrill ==
In February 2012, the SD1 was relaunched as the SD1 Merrill, honoring the late Richard B. Merrill, inventor of the Foveon sensor. With the relaunch, the price was dramatically cut, to a recommended price of US$3300 and a minimum advertised price of $2299. Sigma gave existing SD1 owners credit toward the company's lenses and accessories equal to the price cut.

Type	Lens	2002	2003	2004	2005	2006	2007	2008	2009	2010	2011	2012	2013	2014	2015	2016	2017	2018	2019	2020	2021	2022	2023	2024	2025
MILC	Full frame																								
MILC	Full frame																	BF							
MILC	Full frame																	fp L							
MILC	Full frame																	fp							
MILC	APS-H															SD Quattro H									
MILC	APS-C															SD Quattro									
Compact (Prime lens)	Wide														dp0 Quattro										
Compact (Prime lens)	Wide							DP1		DP1s	DP1x		DP1 Merrill		dp1 Quattro										
Compact (Prime lens)	Normal								DP2	DP2s	DP2x		DP2 Merrill	dp2 Quattro											
Compact (Prime lens)	Tele												DP3 Merrill	dp3 Quattro											
DSLR	APS-C	SD9		SD10				SD14		SD15		SD1	SD1 Merrill												
