= Sigma SA-mount =

Lens mount by Sigma corporation

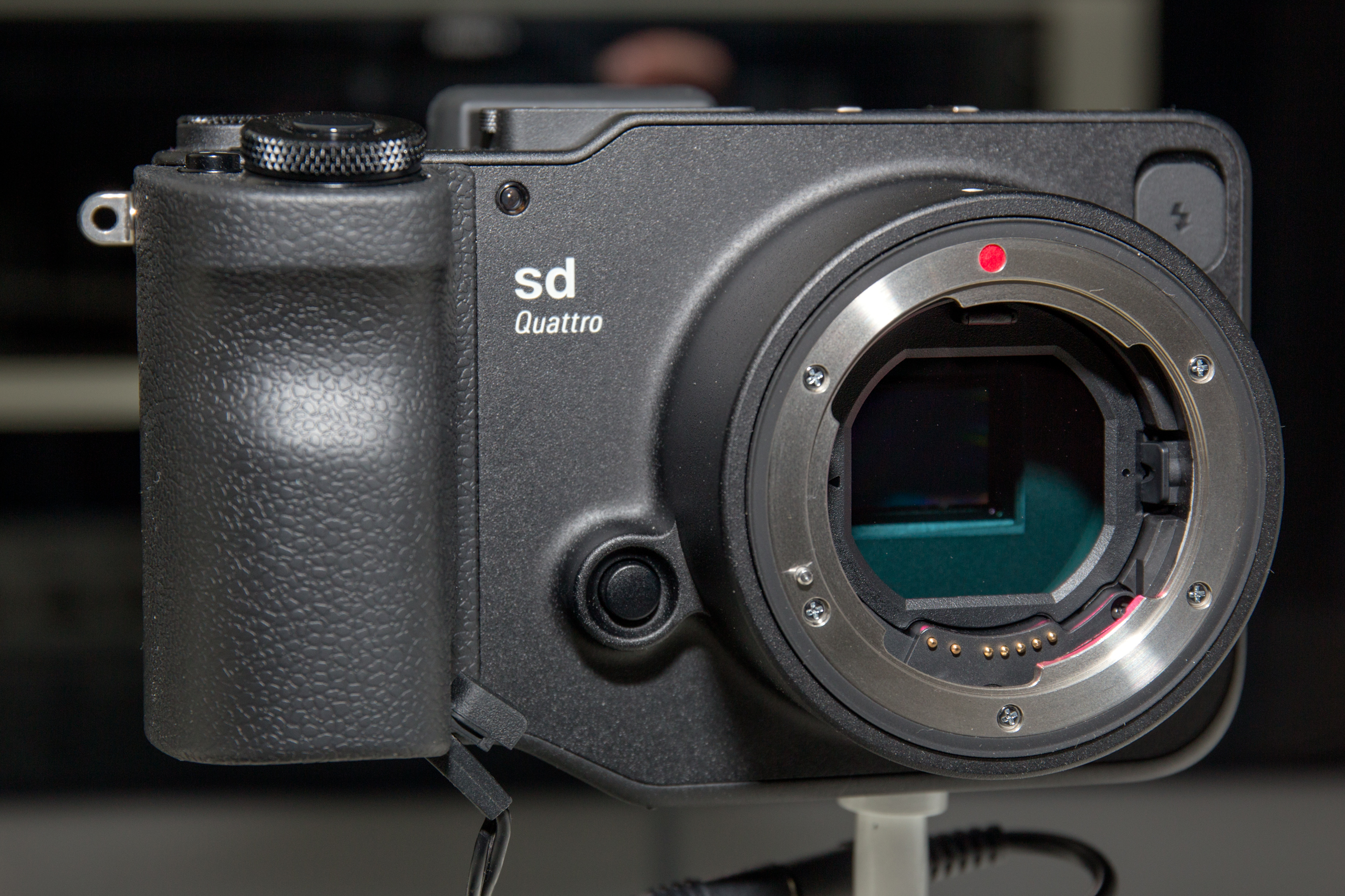
A sigma mount camera, the Sigma sd Quattro

The Sigma SA-mount is a lens mount by the Sigma Corporation of Japan for use on their autofocus single-lens reflex and mirrorless cameras. It was introduced with the SA-300 in 1992. Originally, the SA-mount was a dual-bayonet mount with inner (SA-IB) and outer (SA-OB) bayonets, the latter being a feature intended to mount heavy telephoto lenses, but never utilized by Sigma and consequently dropped with the release of the SD14 in 2007.

There were two precursors to the introduction of SA-mount cameras, the manual-focus Sigma Mark-I in 1976, which still featured a M42 screw lens mount, and the SA-1 of 1983 with Pentax K-mount.

Mechanically, the (inner) SA-mount is similar to the Pentax K-mount as well, but with a flange focal distance of 44.00 mm, identical to that of the Canon EF-mount. Like the EF-mount, the SA-mount uses electrical communication between body and lens, and in fact uses the same signalling lines and protocol as the EF-mount, despite the physical incompatibility. Sigma has long produced EF-mount lenses for Canon cameras, and thus had the ability to use this protocol.

All Sigma SLRs and DSLRs can use manual focus lenses too, which have no electrical communication between body and lens.

In September 2018, Sigma announced that they will stop the development of SA-mount cameras and focus on the Leica L-mount, as members of the L-Mount Alliance alongside Panasonic.

== Compatibility ==
M42-mount lenses can be mounted via adapters utilizing the SA inner bayonet.

Despite the physical similarities Pentax K-mount (PK) lenses can't be fitted straight onto the SA-mount as well. If the protruding AA lever and AA protector outcrop are removed, the fit is slightly loose as the SA-mount has a slightly bigger bore than the PK-mount. However, due to the difference in registration distance scale focusing isn't possible and the close focusing capabilities will be reduced.

Utilizing the SA-OB bayonet mount (on camera bodies supporting it), Nikon F-mount can be fitted and used via a JTAT mount adapter developed by Kazuo Suzuki, Tachibana Seisakusho.

In digital cameras, it is important to make sure that the rear of an adapted lens never hits the camera's dust protector filter when focused to infinity.

== Lens adaptations ==
Newer lenses with Sigma SA-mount can be used on newer Sony E-mount cameras (for example, the Sony ILCE-7 series, the ILCE-5000, ILCE-6000 etc.) using the Sigma MC-11 SA-E mount adapter, introduced in 2016. (A similar Sigma MC-11 EF-E adapter is available to mount Canon EF-mount lenses on Sony E-mount cameras.) The adapters support autofocus, image stabilization and electronic aperture control.

== Camera bodies ==
Body	Release date	Mount	Sensor
Film (24×36 mm)
SA-300/SA-300 QD	1992 or 1993	SA-IB and SA-OB	N/A
SA-300N/SA-300N QD	1994	SA-IB and SA-OB	N/A
SA-5/SA-5 QD	1997	SA-IB and SA-OB	N/A
SA-7/SA-7 QD	2001	SA-IB and SA-OB	N/A
SA-9/SA-9 QD	2001	SA-IB and SA-OB	N/A
SA-7N/SA-7N QD	2002	SA-IB and SA-OB	N/A
Digital (13.8×20.7 mm)
SD9	2002-10	SA-IB and SA-OB	Foveon X3, 1512×2268 pixels
SD10	2003-12	SA-IB and SA-OB	Foveon X3, 1512×2268 pixels
SD14	2007-03	SA-IB only	Foveon X3, 1760×2640 pixels
SD15	2010-06	SA-IB only	Foveon X3, 1760×2640 pixels
Digital (15.7×23.5 mm)
SD1	2011-05	SA-IB only	Foveon X3, 3200×4800 pixels
SD1 Merrill	2012-02	SA-IB only	Foveon X3, 3200×4800 pixels
SD Quattro	2016-02	SA-IB only	Foveon Quattro, 3616×5424 pixels
Digital (17.9×26.7 mm)
SD Quattro H	2016-02	SA-IB only	Foveon Quattro, 4128×6192 pixels

== Lenses ==
All autofocus SLR lenses manufactured by Sigma since 1989 are available for the SA-mount. A partial listing can be found here.

== See also ==
- Kodak DCS Pro SLR/c
