= Microdrive (disambiguation) =

The Microdrive is a miniature hard disk drive device in the CompactFlash II format from the late 1990s, originally developed by IBM.

Microdrive may also refer to:

- ZX Microdrive, a tape-loop data storage system developed by Sinclair Research in the 1980s
- Micro drive, a type of drivetrain on a bicycle
