= Foveon X3 sensor =

Digital camera image sensor

The Foveon X3 sensor is a dormant digital camera image sensor designed by Foveon, Inc., (now part of Sigma Corporation) manufactured by Dongbu Electronics. It uses an array of photosites that consist of three vertically stacked photodiodes. Each of the three stacked photodiodes has a different spectral sensitivity, allowing it to respond differently to different wavelengths. The signals from the three photodiodes are then processed as additive color data that are transformed to a standard RGB color space. In the late 1970s, a similar color sensor having three stacked photo detectors at each pixel location, with different spectral responses due to the differential absorption of light by the semiconductor, had been developed and patented by Kodak.

The X3 sensor technology was first deployed in 2002 in the Sigma SD9 DSLR camera, and subsequently in the SD10, SD14, SD15, SD1 (including SD1 Merrill), the original mirrorless compact Sigma DP1 and Sigma DP2 in 2008 and 2009 respectively, the Sigma dp2 Quattro series from 2014, and the Sigma SD Quattro series from 2016. The development of the Foveon X3 technology is the subject of the 2005 book The Silicon Eye by George Gilder.

== Operation ==
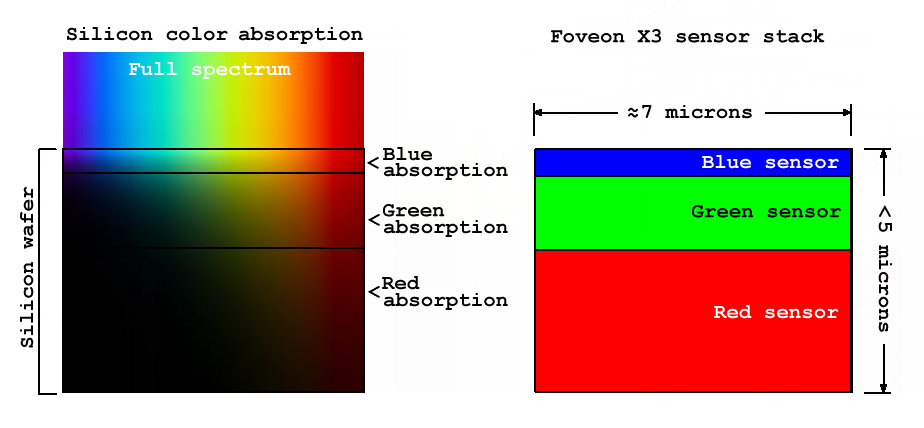
Wavelength-dependent absorption in silicon and the Foveon X3 sensor. See text for explanation.

The diagram to the right depicts how the Foveon X3 sensor works. The image on the left shows the absorption of colors for each wavelength as it passes through the silicon wafer. The image on the right shows a layered sensor stack depicting the colors it detects at each absorption level for each output pixel. The sensor colors shown are only examples. In practice, the color attributes of each output pixel using this sensor result from the camera's image processing algorithms, which use a matrix process to construct a single RGB color from all the data sensed by the photodiode stack.

The depth of the silicon wafer in each of the three sensors is less than five micrometers that creates a negligible effect on focusing or chromatic aberration. However, because the collection depth of the deepest sensor layer (red) is comparable to collection depths in other silicon CMOS and CCD sensors, some diffusion of electrons and loss of sharpness in the longer wavelengths occurs.

== Use ==
The first digital camera to use a Foveon X3 sensor was the Sigma SD9, a digital SLR launched in 2002. It used a 20.7 × 13.8 mm, 2268 x 1512 × 3 (3.54 × 3 MP) iteration of the sensor and was built on a Sigma-designed body using the Sigma SA mount. The camera was followed in 2003 by the improved but technically similar Sigma SD10, which was in turn succeeded in 2006 by the Sigma SD14, which used a higher-resolution, 2640 × 1760 × 3 (4.64 × 3 MP) sensor. The SD14's successor, the Sigma SD15, was released in June 2010 and used the same 2640 × 1760 × 3 sensor as the SD14. The Sigma SD1 was released in June 2011 with a new 23.5×15.7mm APS-C 4800 × 3200 × 3 (15.36 × 3 MP) sensor developed for the professional market.

In 2004, Polaroid Corporation announced the Polaroid x530, a compact camera with a 1408 × 1056 × 3, 1/1.8-in. sensor. The camera had a limited release in 2005 but was recalled later in the year for unspecified image quality problems. Sigma announced a prototype of its Foveon-based compact camera in 2006, the Sigma DP1, using the same 14 MP sensor as the SD14 DSLR. A revised version of the prototype was exhibited in 2007, and the camera was eventually launched in spring 2008. Unlike the Polaroid x530, the DP1 had an APS-C-sized sensor with a 28mm equivalent prime lens. The camera was revised as the DP1s and the DP1x. In 2009, the company launched the DP2, a compact camera using the same sensor and body as the DP1 but with a 41 mm-equivalent f/2.8 lens.

From 2022 the DP0, DP1, DP2 and DP3 cameras were discontinued by Sigma and, as of 2025 no camera by them has used the Foveon X3 sensor.

== Comparison to Bayer-filter sensors ==
The operation of the Foveon X3 sensor is different from that of the Bayer filter image sensor, which is more commonly used in digital cameras. In the Bayer sensor, each photosite in the array consists of a single light sensor (either CMOS or CCD) that, as a result of filtration, is exposed to only one of the three colors detectable on the sensor: red, green, or blue. Constructing a full-color image from a Bayer sensor requires demosaicing, an interpolative process in which the output pixel associated with each photosite is assigned an RGB value based in part on the level of red, green, and blue reported by those photosites adjacent to it. However, the Foveon X3 sensor creates its RGB color output for each photosite by combining the outputs of each of the stacked photodiodes at each of its photosites. This operational difference results in several significant consequences.

=== Color artifacts ===
Because demosaicing is not required for the Foveon X3 sensor to produce a full-color image, the color artifacts ("colored jaggies") associated with the process are not seen. The separate anti-aliasing filter commonly used (Note: Though its use is almost universal with Bayer sensors in digital cameras, it is not absolutely necessary. Kodak once produced two digital cameras, the DCS Pro SLR/n and DCS Pro SLR/c (Digital Photography Review, Kodak DCS Pro SLR/c Review, June 2004, Retrieved March 3, 2007) using Bayer sensors without such a filter. However, significant moiré patterns were produced when photographing very fine detail. Retrieved March 3, 2007.) to mitigate those artifacts in a Bayer sensor is not required; this is because little aliasing occurs when the photodiodes for each color, with the assistance of the microlenses, integrate the optical image over a region almost as big as the spacing of sensors for that color. (Note: Microlenses are commonly used in all types of image sensors in digital cameras; in Bayer-filter sensors, microlenses allow the area of the optical image being averaged (i.e., integrated) per sample to approach 25 percent for red and blue, and 50 percent for green, resulting in very little anti-aliasing. For Foveon X3 sensors, the area being averaged can approach 100 percent for each color, resulting in a significant anti-alias filter effect.) On the other hand, the method of color separation by silicon penetration depth gives more cross-contamination between color layers, meaning more issues with color accuracy.

=== Light gathering and low-light performance ===
Theoretically, the Foveon X3 photosensor can detect more photons entering the camera lens than a mosaic sensor, because each of the color filters overlaying each photosite of a mosaic sensor passes only one of the primary colors and absorbs the other two. However, the individual layers in a Foveon sensor do not respond as sharply to the respective colors; thus color-indicating information in the sensor's raw data requires an "aggressive" matrix (i.e., the removal of common-mode signals) to produce color data in a standard color space, which can increase color noise in low-light situations.

=== Spatial resolution ===
According to Sigma Corporation, "there has been some controversy in how to specify the number of pixels in Foveon sensors." The argument has been over whether sellers should count the number of photosites or the total number of photodiodes, as a megapixel count, and whether either of those should be compared with the number of photodiodes in a Bayer filter sensor or camera as a measure of resolution.

For example, the dimensions of the photosite array in the sensor in the Sigma SD10 camera are 2268 × 1512, and the camera produces a native file size of those dimensions (times three color layers), which amounts to approximately 3.4 million three-color pixels. However, it has been advertised as a 10.2 MP camera by taking into account that each photosite contains stacked red, green, and blue color-sensing photodiodes, or pixel sensors (2268 × 1512 × 3). By comparison, the dimensions of the photosite array in the 10.2 MP Bayer sensor in the Nikon D200 camera are 3872 × 2592, but there is only one photodiode, or one-pixel sensor, at each site. The cameras have equal numbers of photodiodes and produce similar raw data file sizes, but the Bayer filter camera produces a larger native file size via demosaicing.

The actual resolution produced by the Bayer sensor is more complicated than the count of its photosites, or its native file size might suggest; the demosaicing and the separate anti-aliasing filter are both commonly used to reduce the occurrence or severity of color moiré patterns that the mosaic characteristic of the Bayer sensor produces. The effect of this filter blurs the image output of the sensor which produces a lower resolution than the photosite count would seem to imply. This filter is mostly unnecessary with the Foveon X3 sensor and is not used. The earliest camera with a Foveon X3 sensor, the Sigma SD9, showed visible luminance moiré patterns without color moiré.

Subsequent X3-equipped cameras have less aliasing because they include micro-lenses, which provide an anti-aliasing filter by averaging the optical signal over an area commensurate with the sample density. This is not possible in any color channel of a Bayer-type sensor. Aliasing from the Foveon X3 sensor is "far less bothersome because it's monochrome," said Norman Koren. In theory, it is possible for a Foveon X3 sensor with the same number of photodiodes as a Bayer sensor and no separate anti-aliasing filter to attain a higher spatial resolution than that Bayer sensor. Independent tests indicate that the "10.2 MP" array of the Foveon X3 sensor (in the Sigma SD10) has a resolution similar to a 5 MP or 6 MP Bayer sensor. At low ISO speed, it is even similar to a 7.2 MP Bayer sensor.

With the introduction of the Sigma SD14, the 14 MP (4.7 MP red + 4.7 MP green + 4.7 MP blue) Foveon X3 sensor resolution is compared favorably by reviewers to that of 10 MP Bayer sensors. For example, Mike Chaney of ddisoftware says "the SD14 produces better photos than a typical 10 MP DSLR because it is able to carry sharp detail all the way to the 'falloff' point at 1700 LPI, whereas contrast, color detail, and sharpness begin to degrade long before the 1700 LPI limit on a Bayer based 10 MP DSLR."

Another article judges the Foveon X3 sensor as roughly equivalent to a 9 MP Bayer sensor.

A visual comparison between a 14 MP Foveon sensor and a 12.3 MP Bayer sensor shows Foveon has crisper details.

=== Noise ===
The Foveon X3 sensor, as used in the Sigma SD10 camera, has been characterized by two independent reviewers as noisier than the sensors in some other DSLRs using the Bayer sensor at higher ISO film speed equivalents, chroma noise in particular. Another noted higher noise during long exposure times. (Note: This observation is consistent with a comparison of the images, displayed in Digital Photography Review, taken by the Sigma SD10 (see here) with those taken approximately contemporaneously of the same scene by the Bayer sensor-equipped Nikon D70 (see here)/page15.asp. Both retrieved March 6, 2007.) However, these reviewers offer no opinion as to whether this is an inherent property of the sensor or the camera's image-processing algorithms.

With regards to the Sigma SD14, which uses a more recent Foveon X3 sensor, one reviewer judged its noise levels as ranging from "very low" at ISO 100 to "moderate" at ISO 1600 when using the camera's Raw image format.

=== Sample images ===
Sigma's SD14 site has galleries of full-resolution images showing the color produced by the Foveon technology. The 14 MP Foveon chip produces 4.7 MP native-size RGB files; 14 MP Bayer filter cameras produce a 14 MP native file size by interpolation (i.e., demosaicing). Direct visual comparison of images from 12.7 MP Bayer sensors and 14.1 MP Foveon sensors show Bayer images are superior on fine monochrome detail, such as the lines between bricks on a distant building, but the Foveon images are superior in color resolution.

== Further development ==
As of May 2023, the Foveon X3 sensor is less favoured by the average photographer, being overtaken by CMOS sensors which can be made at lower cost with higher resolution and lower noise.

However it was reported in February 2021 that Sigma has been working on a new Foveon sensor but that a critical flaw was found in their development to date and they had to restart development from scratch.

In February 2022 it was reported that Sigma was in the second stage of prototyping the new full frame Foveon sensor. Second stage prototyping in this case is the evaluation of a small image sensor prototype with the same pixel size as the product specifications but with a reduced total pixel count to verify the performance characteristics of the image sensor in practice. Third stage prototyping will evaluate a full-frame image sensor with the same specifications as the mass production devices including the AD converter etc. As of March 2026, development of the updated Foveon X3 sensor was still in Stage 2.

== See also ==
- Color filter array
- Bayer filter
- CYGM filter
- RGBE filter
