= Sigma SD14 =

2007 APS-C digital single-lens reflex camera

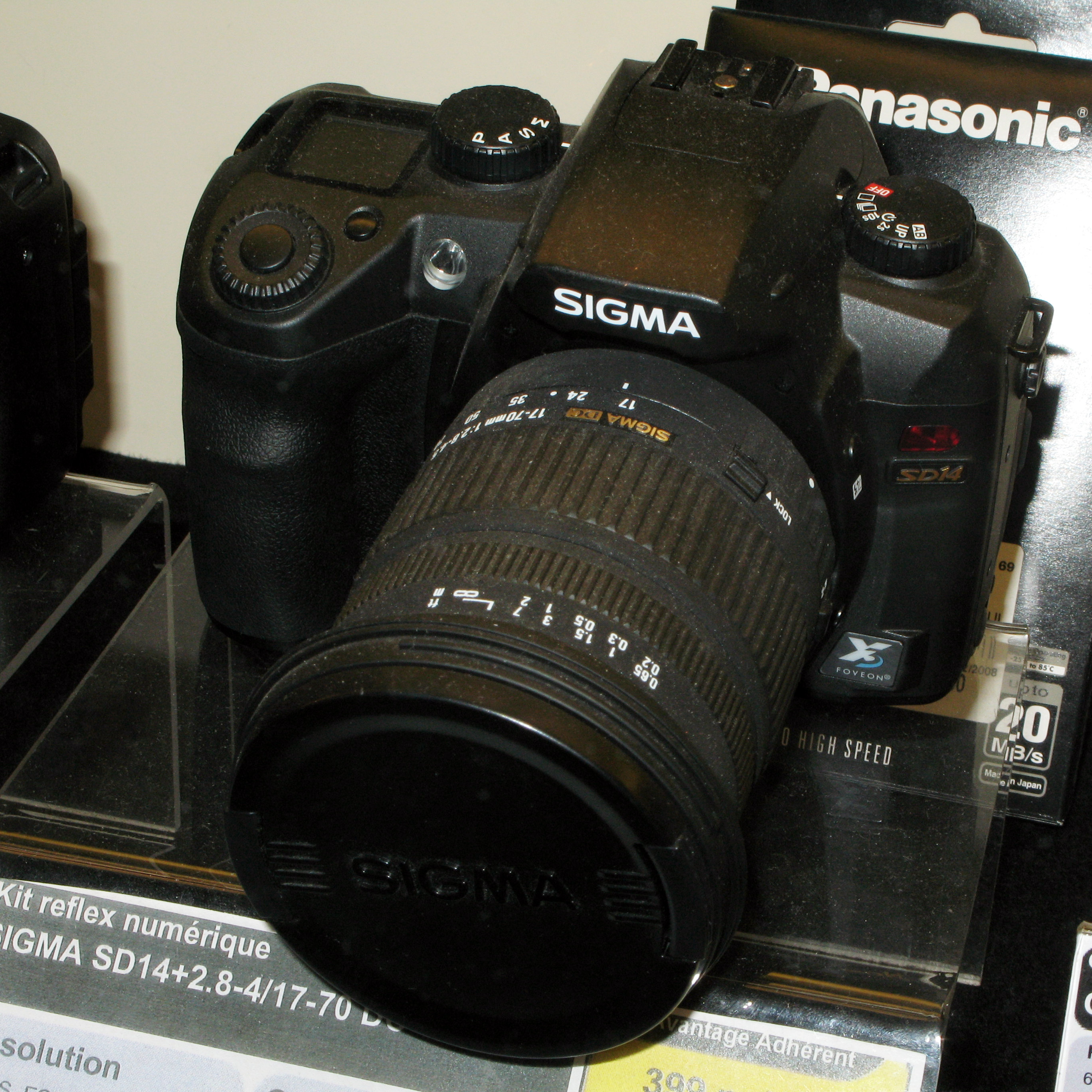

Overview
- Maker: Sigma Corporation
- Type: Digital single-lens reflex

Lens
- Lens: Interchangeable (Sigma SA mount)

Sensor/medium
- Sensor: 20.7 mm × 13.8 mm Foveon X3 sensor
- Maximum resolution: 2652 × 1768 × 3 (14.1 million effective pixels, 4.69 megapixel output image size)
- Film speed: 100–800 in 1 EV steps, 50 and 1600 in extended mode
- Storage media: CompactFlash(CF) (Type I or Type II) and MicroDrive(MD)

Focusing
- Focus modes: One-shot, Continuous, Manual
- Focus areas: 5 points, cross pattern

Exposure/metering
- Exposure modes: Programmed, shutter-priority, aperture priority, manual
- Exposure metering: TTL, full aperture, zones
- Metering modes: Matrix, Center Area, C/Wgt Average

Flash
- Flash: pop-up, sync at 1/180 second

Shutter
- Shutter: electronic focal-plane
- Shutter speed range: 30 s to 1/4000 s, 2 min to 1/4000 s in extended mode
- Continuous shooting: up to 3.0 frame/s

Viewfinder
- Viewfinder: Optical, pentaprism, 98%x98%, 0.9x with 50mm lens at infinity.

Image processing
- White balance: 6 presets, auto, and custom

General
- LCD screen: 2.5-inch (63 mm), 150,000 pixels
- Battery: 1500 mAhr 7.2 V Li-ion rechargeable
- Weight: 700 g (25 oz) (body only)

The Sigma SD14 is a digital single-lens reflex camera produced by the Sigma Corporation of Japan. It is fitted with a Sigma SA mount which takes Sigma SA lenses.

The camera was announced on August 29, 2006 with a "teaser" advertising campaign and was unveiled at the photokina trade show in Cologne, Germany on 2006-09-26. After production delays, Sigma announced the official release of the SD14 to be on March 6, 2007. Sigma has released sample images on their website. Unlike most consumer cameras, which use color sensors based on a Bayer color array, the SD14 uses a Foveon X3 sensor. Another unusual feature is the fact that the infrared filter is fitted to the lens mount rather than the sensor and doubles as a dust protector, sealing the mirror and sensor compartment, and can be removed easily, to allow infrared photography.

== Lenses and focusing ==
The camera uses the SA mount, for which only Sigma itself manufactures lenses.

The SA mount is physically identical to the PK mount with a reduced back-focus of 44.0 mm (equals Canon EOS) as opposed to the 45.5 mm of Pentax PK and M42. The Sigma SA lens protocol is a clone of the Canon EF protocol. This provides the ability for most Canon EF-mount lenses to work seamlessly after exchanging the mount plate with the Sigma DSLRs, but without image stabilization.

Pentax K-mount lenses physically fit, but should only be mounted when the rear protrusions have been dismantled. Such lenses will then focus beyond infinity and may contact the protective filter. A spacer ring (made e.g. of decopperized FR3 1.5 mm circuit board) can be added between the K-mount lens body and its bayonet plate. Prime (as opposed to zoom) lenses often permit a simple resetting of the position of the focusing ring on helical inside. Zoom lenses converted this way will become vari-focals by losing the focus setting as they are zoomed. The spring that opens or closes the lens iris in the K-mount lenses may have to be reset to work in the opposite direction.

Although the Nikon F-mount back-focus at 46.5 mm is well above the 44 mm of the SD14, there is no adapter for the infinity focusing possible as, unlike with Canon EOS, the Nikon bayonet of roughly the same diameter will not fit inside the SA–PK bayonet. The M42 thread does, as taken care of by Asahi when introducing K mount in the 1970s, and therefore all M42 lenses work as is without problems with the SA/M42 converter. Lenses with equal or shorter back-focus (pre-EOS Canon, Minolta, Konica, Miranda) can only be adapted by discarding the old bayonet, milling off extra metal from the lens barrel and adding an SA = PK bayonet flange. Due to the good quality viewfinder (for a crop-DSLR) of the SD14 the missing auto-iris is not a problem, and primes from 45 mm up focus comfortably on the screen down to f/5.6. The camera meters automatically via the AV setting with anything mounted on it or being mounted on, such a microscope or a telescope. For this, the camera should be set to a virtual aperture of 1.0. The SD14's solid construction and decent size make it a desirable platform for laboratory and technical photography.

== Improvements from predecessors ==
The camera has a new body design with more rounded corners and is a little smaller than its predecessors, the SD10 and SD9. Like the previous models, it uses a Foveon X3 direct image sensor, this time with an improved pixel count of 2652 × 1768 × 3 photo-elements (4.7 million locations, 14.1 million total photo-elements). Since there are three layers of sensor elements for each pixel location, one each for red, green, and blue, Sigma and Foveon count 14 megapixels, counting all individual single-color sensor elements. Similarly, companies selling Bayer sensor cameras also count single-color sensor elements as pixels, as does Fujifilm with its Super CCD cameras, in which both large and small photo-sensors under the same color filter and microlens are counted as pixels.

Other improvements over the previous design include a built-in, pop-up flash, FAT32 support for larger-capacity CompactFlash storage cards, a higher continuous shooting speed of 3 frames per second, an upgraded auto focus system with 5 sensors, an AF assist lamp, an improved viewfinder with a 0.9 × magnification, an almost silent and more durable shutter rated at 100,000 actuations, a larger 2.5" LCD monitor, a USB 2.0 interface in place of FireWire, and a proprietary rechargeable (Minolta NP-400 compatible) lithium ion battery system with a claimed 500 shot capacity (user experience puts it closer to 150-200).

Sigma also states that the re-design of the shutter has eliminated the problem of particles flaking off of that mechanism and onto the sensor. Sigma has also revised the infrared filter (dust protector); it is now a round snap-in design rather than the square, sturdier screw-in version of the SD10.

== Output data options ==
The camera can output a raw file size of 14.1 million sample values, organized as 2652 × 1768 × 3, or a JPEG image up to 14 megapixels, or 4608 × 3072 (interpolated) pixels. The camera's ISO range extends from 100 to 800 (or 50 to 1600 in extended mode). There is not much degradation going from 100 to 200 and even 400.

In the raw file, each of 4.7 million triples of digitized data from the sensor contains three measurements taken at three different depths within the silicon chip. The penetration of light into silicon is dependent on the wavelength of the light; therefore, the red, green, and blue values can be independently calculated at each of 4.7 million locations.

This is in contrast to the approach utilized in a Bayer sensor, which can only measure one color channel at each location, and must interpolate the remaining color information based on the neighboring values. The SD14 image quality has been compared to 9–12 megapixel Bayer-sensor cameras, depending on light conditions and types of colors present in the image.

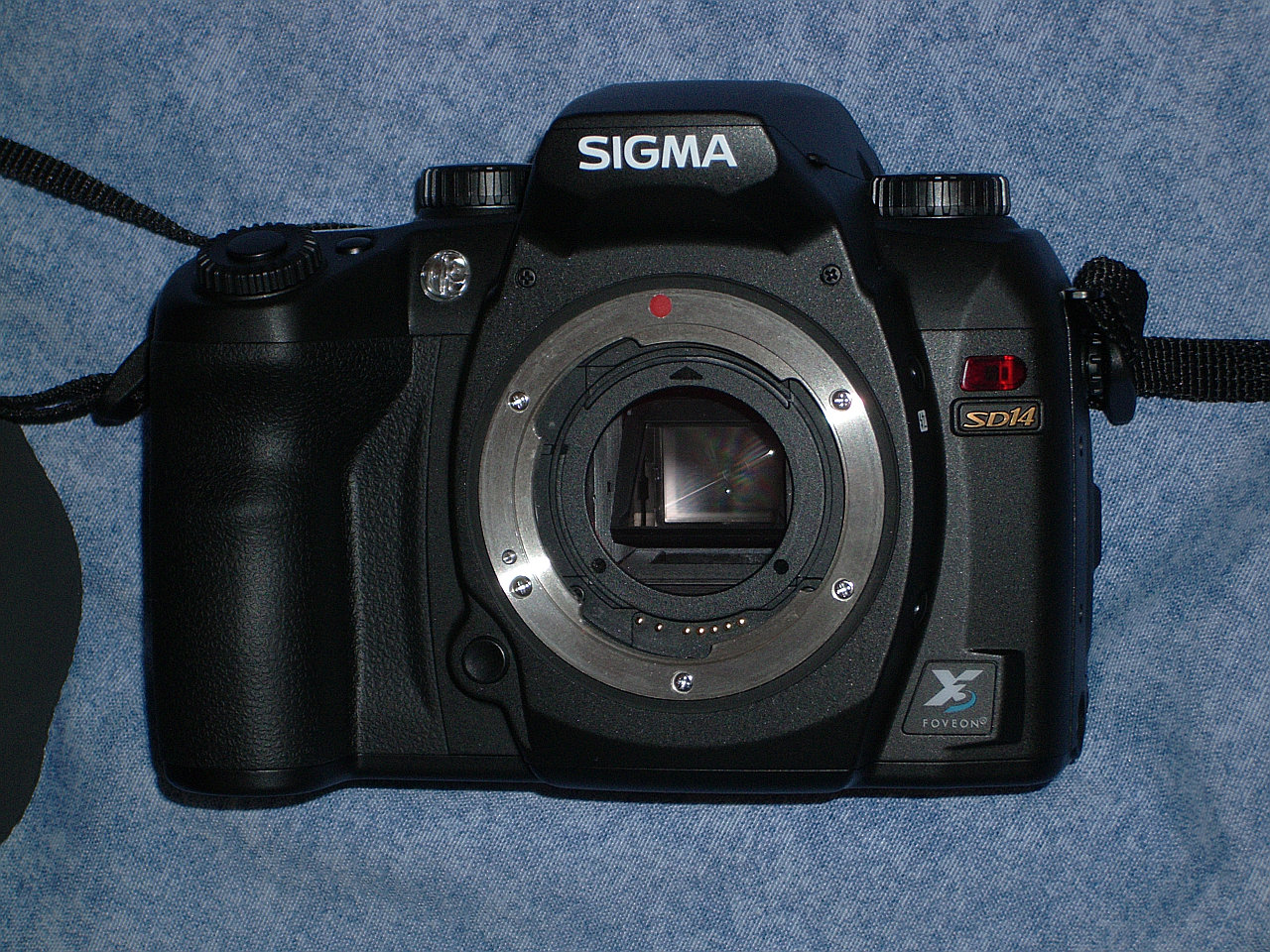
Sigma SD14 front

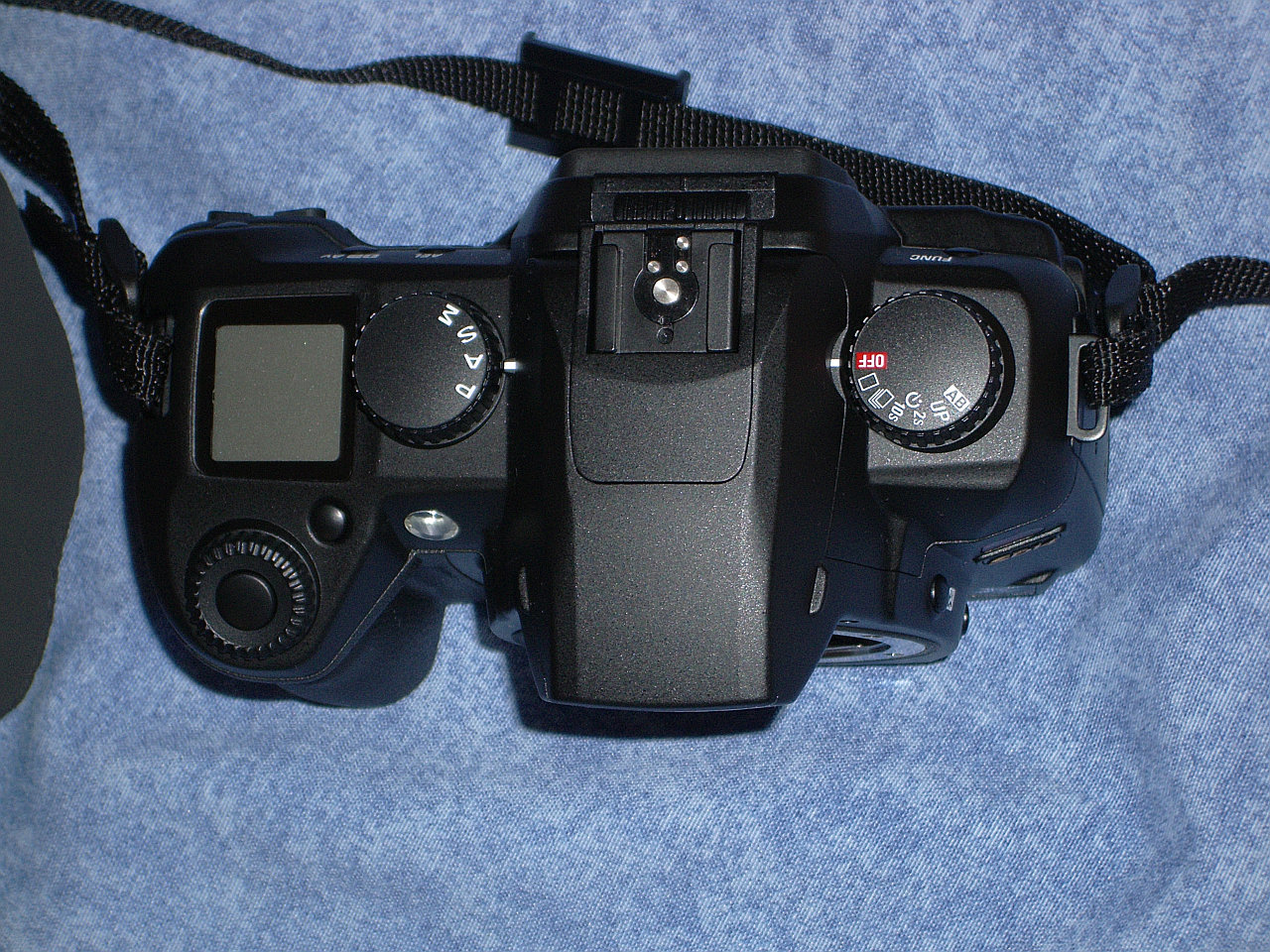
Sigma SD14 top

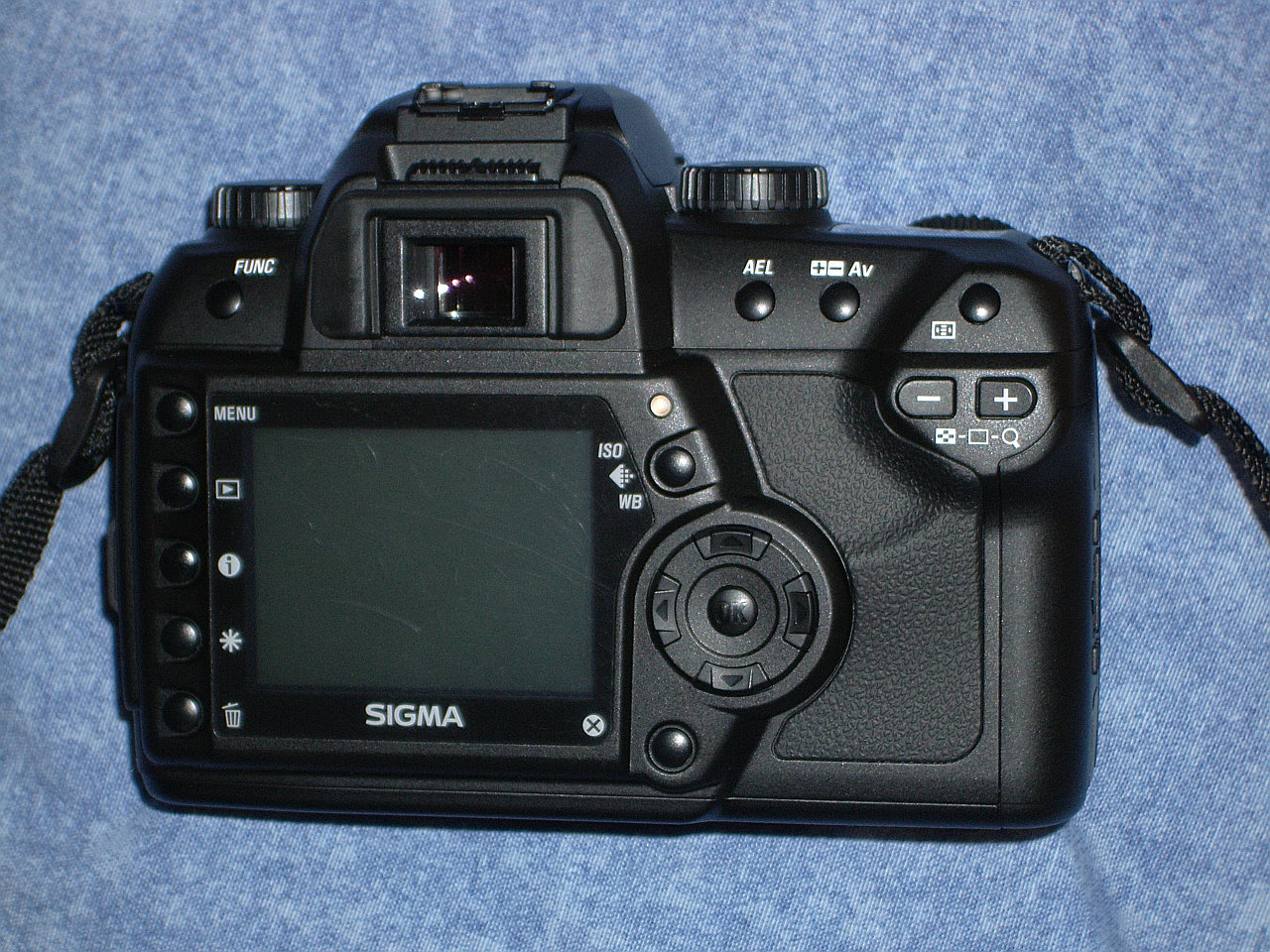
Sigma SD14 back

| Type | Lens | 2002 | 2003 | 2004 | 2005 | 2006 | 2007 | 2008 | 2009 | 2010 | 2011 | 2012 | 2013 | 2014 | 2015 | 2016 | 2017 | 2018 | 2019 | 2020 | 2021 | 2022 | 2023 | 2024 | 2025 |
| MILC | Full frame | | | | | | | | | | | | | | | | | | | | | | | | |
| MILC | Full frame | | | | | | | | | | | | | | | | | BF | | | | | | | |
| MILC | Full frame | | | | | | | | | | | | | | | | | fp L | | | | | | | |
| MILC | Full frame | | | | | | | | | | | | | | | | | fp | | | | | | | |
| MILC | APS-H | | | | | | | | | | | | | | | SD Quattro H | | | | | | | | | |
| MILC | APS-C | | | | | | | | | | | | | | | SD Quattro | | | | | | | | | |
| Compact (Prime lens) | Wide | | | | | | | | | | | | | | dp0 Quattro | | | | | | | | | | |
| Compact (Prime lens) | Wide | | | | | | | DP1 | | DP1s | DP1x | | DP1 Merrill | | dp1 Quattro | | | | | | | | | | |
| Compact (Prime lens) | Normal | | | | | | | | DP2 | DP2s | DP2x | | DP2 Merrill | dp2 Quattro | | | | | | | | | | | |
| Compact (Prime lens) | Tele | | | | | | | | | | | | DP3 Merrill | dp3 Quattro | | | | | | | | | | | |
| DSLR | APS-C | SD9 | | SD10 | | | | SD14 | | SD15 | | SD1 | SD1 Merrill | | | | | | | | | | | | |
