= Sigma SD10 =

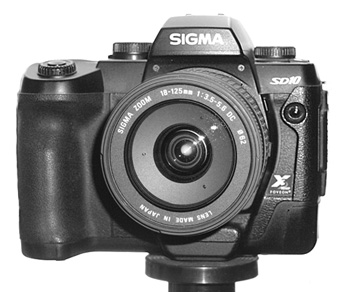

Overview
- Maker: Sigma Corporation
- Type: Digital single-lens reflex

Lens
- Lens: Interchangeable (Sigma SA mount)

Sensor/medium
- Sensor: 20.7 mm × 13.8 mm Foveon X3 sensor
- Maximum resolution: 2268 × 1512 × 3 (10.3 million effective pixels, 3.43 megapixel output image size)
- Film speed: 100–1600 in 1 EV steps
- Storage media: CompactFlash (CF) (Type I or Type II) and Microdrive (MD)

Focusing
- Focus modes: One-shot, Continuous, Manual
- Focus areas: 1 point

Exposure/metering
- Exposure modes: Programmed, shutter-priority, aperture priority, manual
- Exposure metering: TTL, full aperture, zones
- Metering modes: 8-segment evaluative, center area (about 7.5%), Center-weighted average

Flash
- Flash: none, sync at 1/180 second

Shutter
- Shutter: electronic focal-plane
- Shutter speed range: 30 s to 1/6000 s
- Continuous shooting: up to 2.5 frames per second

Viewfinder
- Viewfinder: Optical, pentaprism

Image processing
- White balance: 6 presets, auto, and custom

General
- LCD screen: 1.8-inch (45 mm), 150,000 pixels
- Battery: 4×AA NiMH or 2×CR-V3
- Weight: 785 g (28 oz) (body only)

The Sigma SD10 is a digital single-lens reflex camera (DSLR) manufactured by the Sigma Corporation of Japan. It was announced on October 27, 2003, and is an evolution of the previous SD9 model, addressing many of the shortcomings of that camera. The Sigma SD10 is unique amongst DSLRs in that it uses a full-colour Foveon sensor (instead of one with a colour filter array) and that it only produces raw format images that require post-processing on a computer.

== Foveon X3 image sensor ==
Like its predecessor, the SD10 uses a sensor with the unique Foveon X3 sensor technology. The 10.2-million-pixel raw file generated from this sensor is processed to produce a 3.4 megapixel size image file. Although the image file is smaller than images from competing 10 megapixel cameras, it is made from the same number of measured data values because the Foveon sensor detects full-colour data (three values) at each photosite; the actual resolution contained in its 3.4 MP images is about the same as a conventional Bayer filter sensor of 7–9 MP. Sigma and Foveon count each red, green, and blue sensor as a pixel, and state the camera has 10.2 million pixels; similarly, companies selling Bayer filter cameras also count each single-colour sensor element as a pixel.

== Raw output only ==
Unlike other DSLR cameras marketed concurrently, the SD10 performs no in-camera processing to common image formats such as JPEG and TIFF. Instead, it saves images in its own .X3F format, which retains all the information the camera captured. Processing on a computer is required to use these files. Sigma provides the Foveon-written SIGMA Photo Pro application for this purpose; in addition, Adobe Photoshop CS2 supports the format, as do several other image-processing applications.

== Shooting modes ==
The camera supports single-shot, continuous, 2 or 10 second self-timer, mirror lock-up, and auto exposure bracketing.

== Exposure modes ==
Four different exposure modes are supported: aperture priority (A), shutter speed priority (S), manual (M) and program automatic (P).

== Lens availability ==
The SD10 supports only Sigma SA mount lenses. Only Sigma produces lenses to fit this mount. Third-party converters exist for a number of other lens mounts, although no automatic features are supported. Many Canon EF mount lenses can be converted to SA mount while retaining autofocus and camera controlled aperture settings, however optical stabilisation will not work.

Type	Lens	2002	2003	2004	2005	2006	2007	2008	2009	2010	2011	2012	2013	2014	2015	2016	2017	2018	2019	2020	2021	2022	2023	2024	2025
MILC	Full frame																								
MILC	Full frame																	BF							
MILC	Full frame																	fp L							
MILC	Full frame																	fp							
MILC	APS-H															SD Quattro H									
MILC	APS-C															SD Quattro									
Compact (Prime lens)	Wide														dp0 Quattro										
Compact (Prime lens)	Wide							DP1		DP1s	DP1x		DP1 Merrill		dp1 Quattro										
Compact (Prime lens)	Normal								DP2	DP2s	DP2x		DP2 Merrill	dp2 Quattro											
Compact (Prime lens)	Tele												DP3 Merrill	dp3 Quattro											
DSLR	APS-C	SD9		SD10				SD14		SD15		SD1	SD1 Merrill												
