= Sigma SD9 =

Sigma SD 9
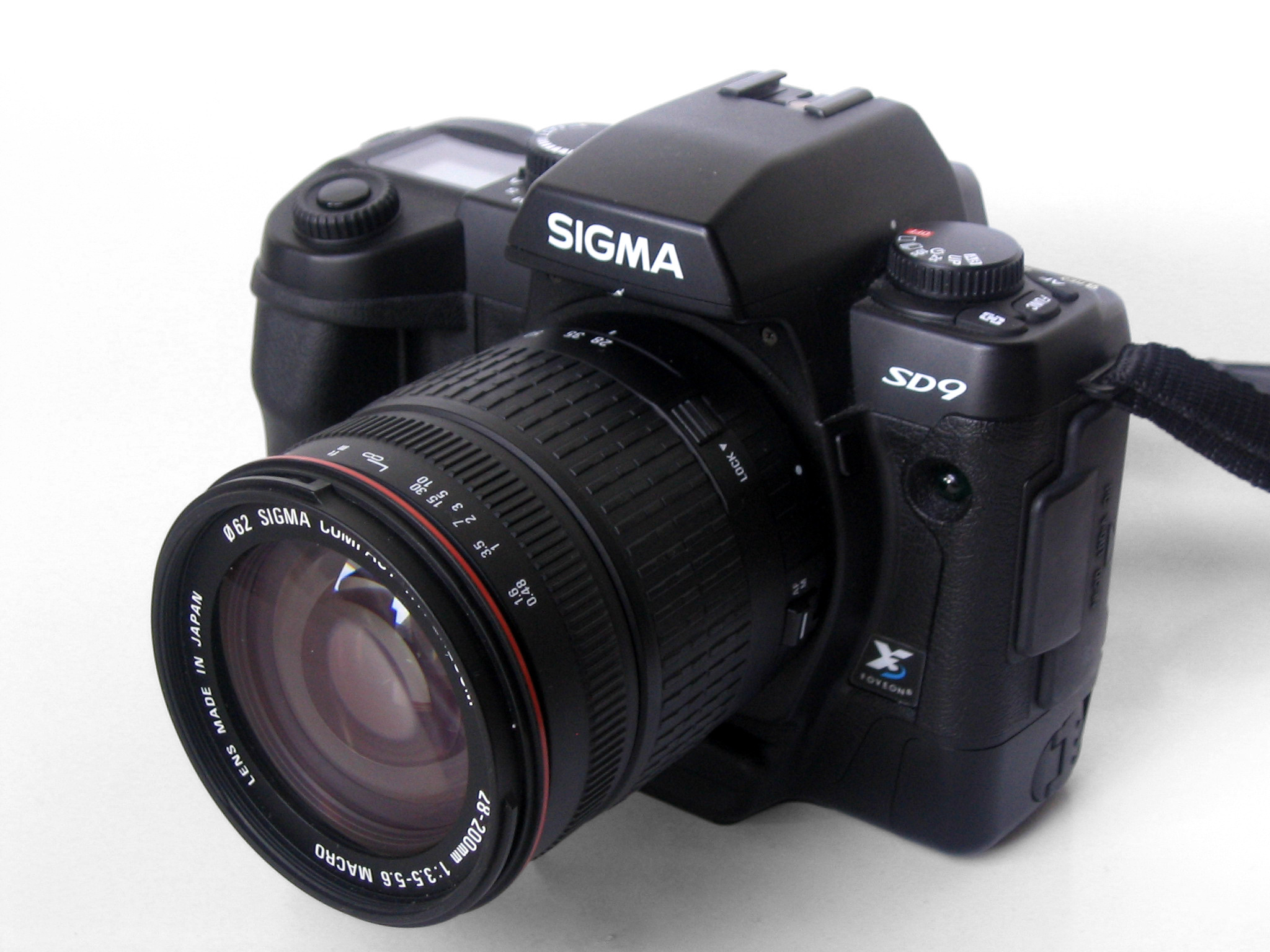
- Front of the SD9 with a 28-200mm lens

Overview
- Maker: Sigma Corporation
- Type: Digital single-lens reflex

Lens
- Lens: Interchangeable (Sigma SA mount)

Sensor/medium
- Sensor: 20.7 mm × 13.8 mm Foveon X3 sensor
- Maximum resolution: 2268 × 1512 × 3 (10.3 million effective pixels, 3.43 megapixel output image size)
- Film speed: 100–400 in 1 EV steps
- Storage media: CompactFlash(CF) (Type I or Type II) and Microdrive(MD)

Focusing
- Focus modes: One-shot, Continuous, Manual
- Focus areas: 1 point

Exposure/metering
- Exposure modes: Programmed, shutter-priority, aperture priority, manual
- Exposure metering: TTL, full aperture, zones
- Metering modes: 8-segment evaluative, center area (about 7.5%), Center-weighted average

Flash
- Flash: none, sync at 1/180 second

Shutter
- Shutter: electronic focal-plane
- Shutter speed range: 15 s to 1/6000 s
- Continuous shooting: up to 2.5 frames per second

Viewfinder
- Viewfinder: Optical, pentaprism

Image processing
- White balance: 6 presets, auto, and custom

General
- LCD screen: 1.8-inch (45 mm), 130,000 pixels
- Battery: 4xAA NiMH or 2xCR-V3
- Weight: 785 g (28 oz) (body only)

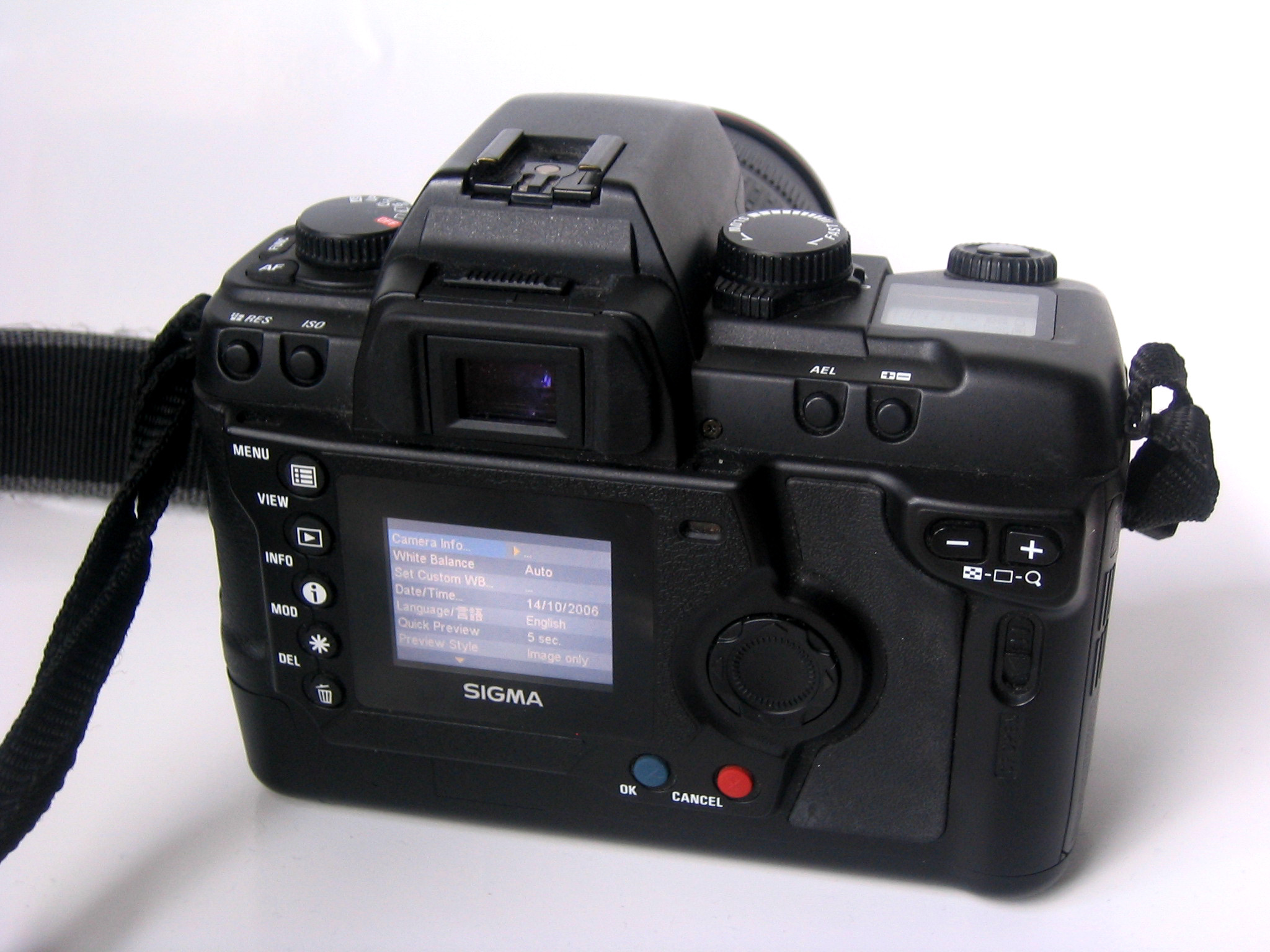
Back of the SD9

The Sigma SD9 is a digital single-lens reflex camera (DSLR) produced by the Sigma Corporation of Japan. The camera was launched at the Photo Marketing Association Annual Show on February 18, 2002. It was Sigma's first digital camera, and was the first production camera to use the unique Foveon X3 image sensor, which reads full color at each pixel site. Other sensors detect only one color at each site and interpolate to produce a full-color image.

The SD9 had two separate power systems; one set of CR-123A lithium batteries in the handgrip powered the camera functions, while another pair of CR-V3 batteries or four AA size rechargeable batteries in a battery tray in the base powered the digital functions. This split power system showed that the camera functions (inherited from Sigma's SA-9 film SLR) were not integrated at all with the digital half.

Another unusual feature of the SD9 was its "dust cover" filter right behind the lens mount, to prevent dust getting into the chamber and onto the sensor when changing lenses.

Reviewers and users reported good results in good lighting, but poorer ones in low light using either high ISO sensitivity or longer exposures.

The SD9 was succeeded by an updated model, the SD10, which addressed the power and low-light issues.

Type	Lens	2002	2003	2004	2005	2006	2007	2008	2009	2010	2011	2012	2013	2014	2015	2016	2017	2018	2019	2020	2021	2022	2023	2024	2025
MILC	Full frame																								
MILC	Full frame																	BF							
MILC	Full frame																	fp L							
MILC	Full frame																	fp							
MILC	APS-H															SD Quattro H									
MILC	APS-C															SD Quattro									
Compact (Prime lens)	Wide														dp0 Quattro										
Compact (Prime lens)	Wide							DP1		DP1s	DP1x		DP1 Merrill		dp1 Quattro										
Compact (Prime lens)	Normal								DP2	DP2s	DP2x		DP2 Merrill	dp2 Quattro											
Compact (Prime lens)	Tele												DP3 Merrill	dp3 Quattro											
DSLR	APS-C	SD9		SD10				SD14		SD15		SD1	SD1 Merrill												
