= IEEE Masaru Ibuka Consumer Electronics Award =

Technical award

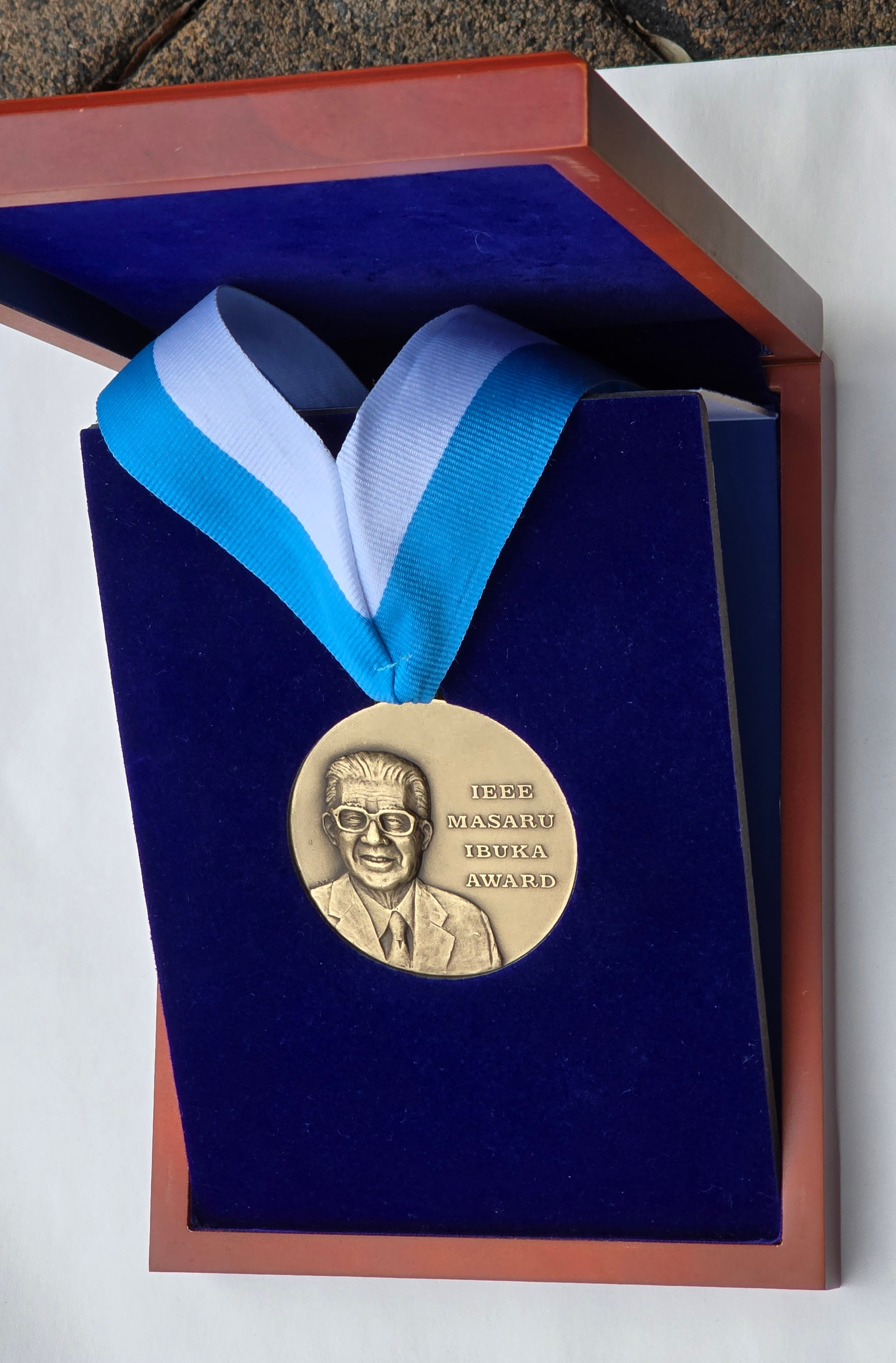
- Awarded for: outstanding contributions to consumer electronics technology.
- Sponsored by: Institute of Electrical and Electronics Engineers
- Country: USA
- First award: 1987
- Website: IEEE Masaru Ibuka Consumer Electronics Award

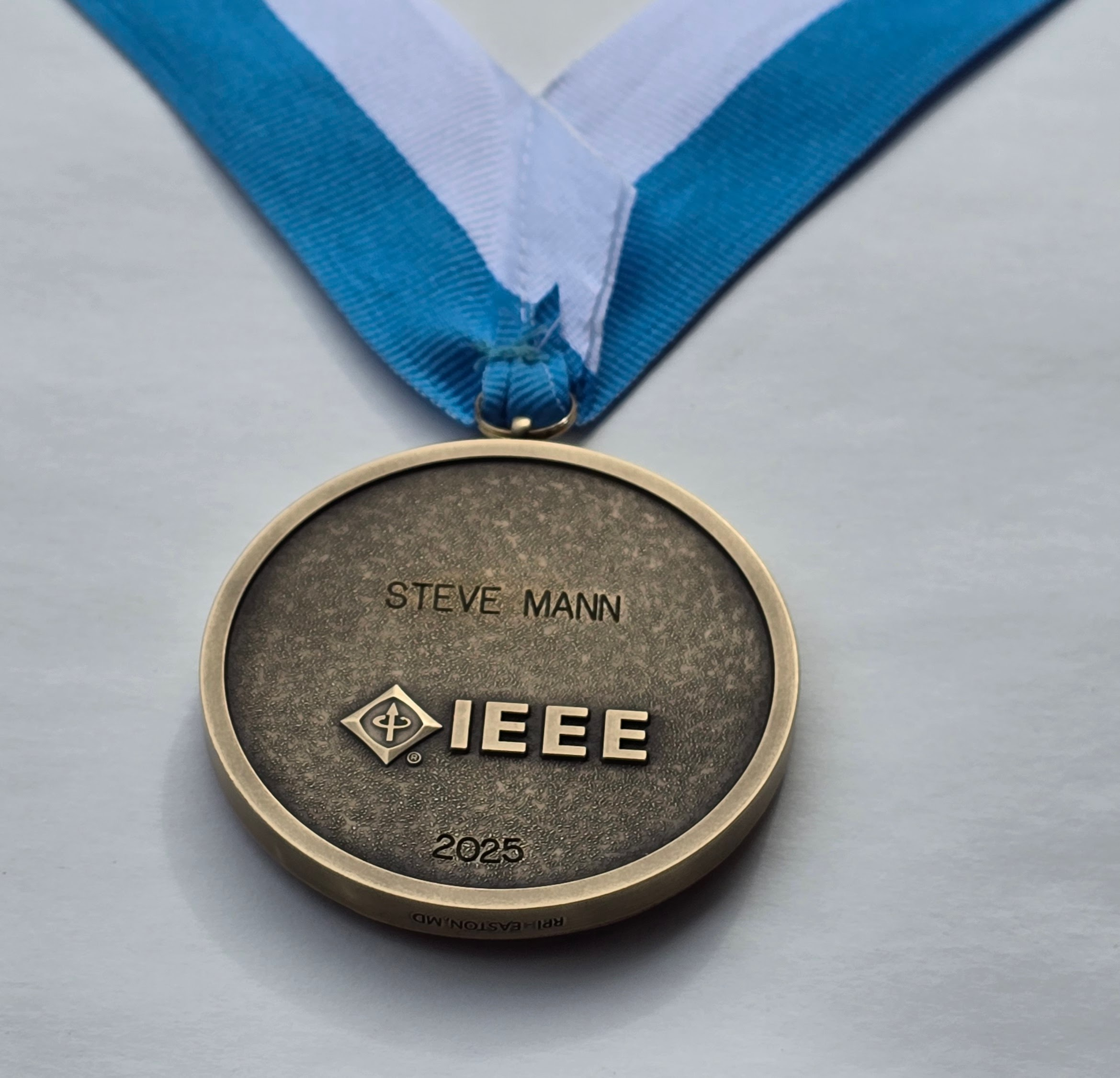
IEEE Consumer Electronics Award (Ibuka Award), back

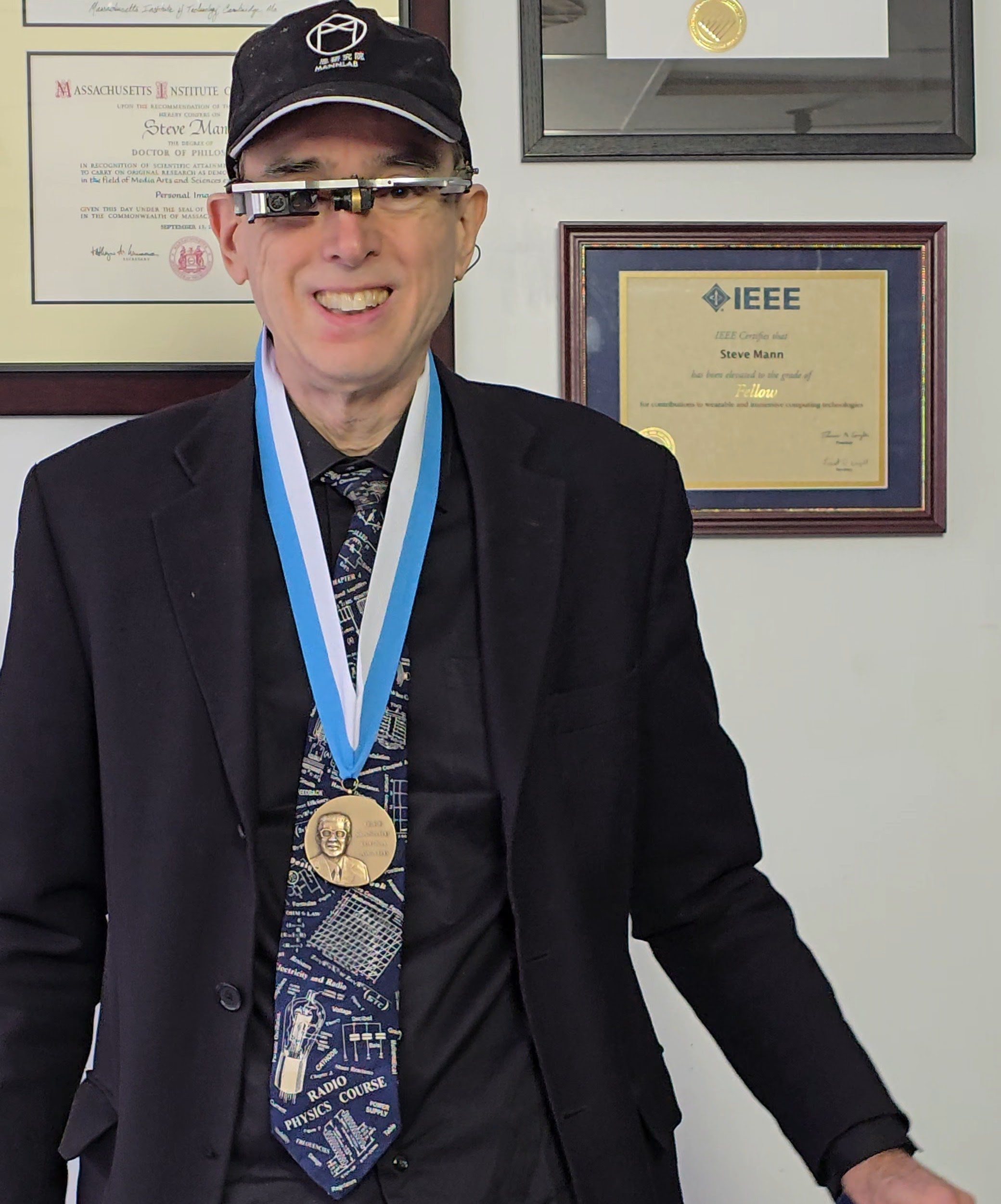
IEEE Consumer Electronics Award (Ibuka Award) as worn around the neck of 2025 Award recipient Steve Mann

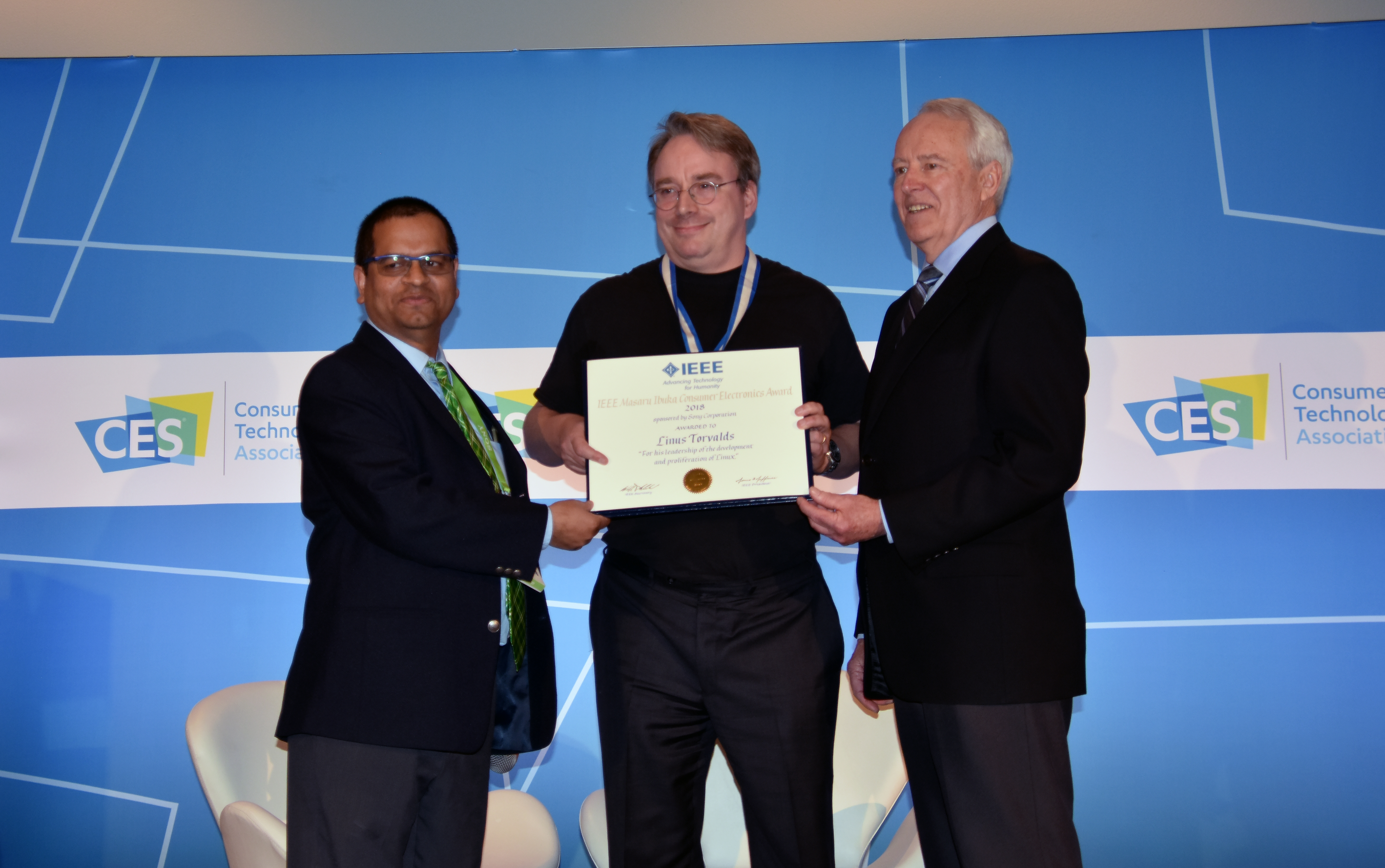
IEEE Consumer Electronics Award (Ibuka Award) certificate as presented to Linus Torvalds 2018 at CES / IEEE ICCE in Las Vegas

The IEEE Masaru Ibuka Consumer Electronics Award is a Technical Field Award of the IEEE given for outstanding contributions to consumer electronics technology. It is named in honor of Masaru Ibuka, co-founder and honorary chairman of Sony Corporation. The award is currently given each year to an individual or a team of up to three people (although in 2002, it was given to five people). The award was established by the IEEE Board of Directors in 1987, and is sponsored by Sony Corporation. The award is usually given in an awards ceremony at CES / IEEE ICCE in Las Vegas near the beginning of the year it is awarded.

Recipients of this award receive a bronze medal, a certificate, and an honorarium. The certificate is signed by the IEEE Secretary and the IEEE President.

== Recipients ==
Year	Citation	Recipient(s)
1989	for development of the compact disc system	Heitaro Nakajima (Sony)
1989	for development of the compact disc system	Johannes Petrus Sinjou (Philips)
1990	for development of the autofocus camera	Norman L. Stauffer
1991	for contributions to the development of the charge-coupled device image sensors in consumer video cameras	Gilbert F. Amelio
1992	for demonstrating technical feasibility of large size color LCD displays suitable for consumer TV applications	Isamu Washizuka (Sharp)
1993	for contributions to consumer electronics products employing synthetic speech for education and entertainment	George L. Brantingham (TI)
1993	for contributions to consumer electronics products employing synthetic speech for education and entertainment	Paul S. Breedlove (CompuAdd)
1993	for contributions to consumer electronics products employing synthetic speech for education and entertainment	Richard H. Wiggins (TI)
1994	for contributions to FM stereophonic and television multichannel sound broadcasting systems	Carl G. Eilers (Zenith)
1995	for the Reed-Solomon codes	Irving S. Reed
1995	for the Reed-Solomon codes	Gustave Solomon
1996	for contributions to consumer digital audio and video recording products	Kees A. Schouhamer Immink (Philips)
1997	for contributions to the development of audio noise reduction and surround sound systems	Ray M. Dolby (Dolby)
1998	for engineering leadership in the development of digital television for broadcast, cable and satellite applications	Jerrold A. Heller
1999	for technical leadership in the development of the MPEG international standards for motion video and audio	Leonardo Chiariglione
2000	for contributions to the development of low-light level, solid-state imagers used in consumer products	Marvin H. White
2001	for leadership in the development of digital video broadcast	Ulrich Reimers
2002	for pioneering contributions to the research and development of HDTV	Takashi Fujio
2002	for pioneering contributions to the research and development of HDTV	Kozo Hayashi
2002	for pioneering contributions to the research and development of HDTV	Masao Sugimoto
2002	for pioneering contributions to the research and development of HDTV	Masahiko Morizono
2002	for pioneering contributions to the research and development of HDTV	Yuichi Ninomiya
2003	for contributions to the synthesis and analysis of loudspeakers (Thiele/Small parameters)	Richard H. Small
2003	for contributions to the synthesis and analysis of loudspeakers (Thiele/Small parameters)	Neville Thiele
2004	for major contributions to MP3 audio coding	Karlheinz Brandenburg
2005	No award	
2006	Vestigial sideband	Wayne Bretl (Zenith)
2006	Vestigial sideband	Richard Citta
2006	Vestigial sideband	Wayne Luplow (Zenith)
2007	for contributions in audio and cinema multichannel playback systems (THX)	Tomlinson Holman
2008	for development of home interactive video games and other toys	Ralph H. Baer
2009	inventor of the first wireless remote control	Eugene J. Polley (Zenith)
2010	for contributions to the development and commercialization of digital video recorders	James Barton (TiVo)
2011	for contributions to image compression in printing technology and digital image processing	Joan Laverne Mitchell (Ricoh)
2012	for leadership and technical contributions to H.264/MPEG-4 AVC	Gisle Bjøntegaard (Tandberg)
2012	for leadership and technical contributions to H.264/MPEG-4 AVC	Gary J. Sullivan (Microsoft)
2012	for leadership and technical contributions to H.264/MPEG-4 AVC	Thomas Wiegand (Fraunhofer)
2013	for the development and marketing of spectral band replication at Coding Technologies (now part of Dolby Laboratories)	Lars Liljeryd
2013	for the development and marketing of spectral band replication at Coding Technologies (now part of Dolby Laboratories)	Kristofer Kjörling
2013	for the development and marketing of spectral band replication at Coding Technologies (now part of Dolby Laboratories)	Martin Dietz
2014	No award	
2015	inventor of the mobile phone	Martin Cooper
2016	for designing and building the first digital still camera	Steven Sasson
2017	for pioneering contributions to high-speed Wireless LAN technology	John O'Sullivan
2017	for pioneering contributions to high-speed Wireless LAN technology	David Skellern
2017	for pioneering contributions to high-speed Wireless LAN technology	Terence Percival
2018	for his leadership of the development and proliferation of Linux	Linus Torvalds
2019	for accelerating the replacement of 100-year-old analog film technologies used in cinema and television by providing extremely high visual quality using digital-imaging solution	Tomonori Aoyama
2019	for accelerating the replacement of 100-year-old analog film technologies used in cinema and television by providing extremely high visual quality using digital-imaging solution	Takashi Hayasaka
2020	for creating an inexpensive single-board computer and surrounding ecosystem for education and consumer applications (Raspberry Pi)	Eben C. Upton (Raspberry Pi Foundation)
2021	for pioneering the design of consumer-friendly personal computers.	Steve Wozniak
2022	for contributions to the development of image sensors with integrated color filter arrays for digital video and still cameras	Peter Dillon and Albert Brault
2023	for leadership in creating open and free operating systems for embedded computers in consumer electronics.	Ken Sakamura
2024	for the design of the 32-bit ARM RISC microprocessor	Steve Furber and Sophie Wilson
2025	for contributions to the advancement of wearable computing and high dynamic range imaging.	Steve Mann
2026	No award	
2027	for transformative contributions to mobile communication through visionary leadership that reshaped global consumer technology	Mike Lazaridis

== See also ==
- Prizes named after people
