= John Ernest Benson =

Australian engineer & researcher (1911–1989)

John Ernest Benson (1911–1989) was an Australian engineer and researcher who contributed to studies on piezoelectric crystals, television and sound systems, particularly loudspeakers.

== Achievements ==
Benson was born in 1911 and educated at Sydney Technical High School and the University of Sydney, earning his Bachelors of Engineering in 1934. Shortly afterward he joined the Research Laboratories of AWA. He made contributions to many areas of electronics, starting with piezoelectric crystals. After earning a master's degree in 1945, he moved on to study color television and loudspeakers in the late 1940s and 1950s. On 3 November 1948, the first Australian-produced television set was unveiled at the IRE Radio Convention. The team who created the set were Benson, H.J. Oyston and B.R Johnson, who were present at the unveiling.

He designed a novel electrically tapered column loudspeaker system for the Sydney Town Hall to successfully solve some acoustic problems with the space. This design lent credibility to the team at AWA and they won a contract to design the sound reinforcement system for the new Sydney Opera House in 1960. The design once again used column loudspeakers and it won a Duke of Edinburgh prize for industrial design for both Benson and AWA in 1972. The centre electrically tapered column loudspeaker system from the Opera House was removed during a system upgrade in 1998 but is still in storage as of 2025.

Benson was editor of the AWA Technical Review journal from 1948 until 1975, when he retired. A series of papers published in Australian journals (including the AWA Technical Review) from 1968 to 1972 put a firm technical foundation on the electroacoustics of the era, clearly creating a single mathematical loudspeaker enclosure model that could be used to describe sealed, vented, and passive radiator enclosures, and similar types with various sorts of damping elements. Benson was the examiner for the 1972 PhD Thesis of Richard H. Small, of Thiele/Small parameters. AWA Technical Review was also the original publisher for A. Neville Thiele's 1961 papers on vented box loudspeakers. Thiele's papers were not well known until reprinted in the Journal of the Audio Engineering Society (JAES) in 1971. Richard Small also published in the JAES in the early 1970s.

Benson died in 1989 at age 78. An obituary tribute was written about him by fellow Australian loudspeaker researcher Neville Thiele in the JAES.

In 1996, Prompt Publications published Benson's 1968–1972 three part paper series on loudspeaker cabinet design, with an introduction by Don and Carolyn Davis, as: "Theory and Design of Loudspeaker Enclosures" Don and Carolyn are founders of the well-known Synergistic Audio Concepts, or SynAudCon.

== Selected publications ==
=== Piezo-electricity ===
- Benson, J.E., Builder, G. "Noise Interference in Radio Receivers" A.W.A. Technical Review, 2 (1936), 23–32.
- Benson, J.E., Builder, G. "Precision Frequency-Control Equipment Using Quartz Crystals" World Radio Convention. Proceedings. (Sydney, 1938), paper no.31; A.W.A. Technical Review, 3 (1938), 157–214.
- Benson, J.E. "Crystal Control of the Mixer Oscillator in a Superheterodyne Receiver" A.W.A. Technical Review, 4 (1939), 127–137.
- Benson, J.E. "Crystal Control of the Mixer Oscillator in a Superheterodyne Receiver II" A.W.A. Technical Review, 5 (1940), 29–40.
- Benson, J.E. "A Piezo-Electric Calibrator" A.W.A. Technical Review, 5 (1940), 47–50.
- Benson, J.E., Builder, G. "Contour-Mode Vibrations in Y-Cut Quartz-Crystal Plates. Institute of Radio Engineers. Proceedings., 29 (1941), 182–185; A.W.A. Technical Review, 5 (1941), 181–189.
- Benson, J.E., Builder, G. "Simple Quartz-Crystal Filters of Variable Bandwidth" A.W.A. Technical Review, 5 (1941), 93–103; Wireless Engineer, 20 (1943), 183–189.
- Benson, J.E. "Modes of Vibration and Design of V-Cut Quartz Plates for Medium Broadcast Frequencies" A.W.A. Technical Review, 6 (1943–44), 73–90.
- Benson, J.E., Brown, A.G. "Remote Control of Crystal-Locked Receivers" A.W.A. Technical Review, 6 (1943–44), 161–175.
- Benson, J.E., Ross H.A. "A Telecontrolled Tunable Receiver Installation" A.W.A. Technical Review, 6 (1943–44), 267–283.

=== Television ===
- Benson, J.E, "A Survey of the Methods and Colorimetric Principles of Colour Television", Proceedings of the IRE(Aust), (Jul–Aug 1951)

=== Loudspeakers ===
- Benson, J.E. "Theory and Design of Loudspeaker Enclosures, Part 1 – Electro-Acoustical Relations and General Analysis", Amalgamated Wireless Australia Technical Review, (1968)
- Benson, J.E. "Theory and Design of Loudspeaker Enclosures, Part 2 – Response Relationships for Infinite Baffle and Closed Box Systems", Amalgamated Wireless Australia Technical Review, (1971)
- Benson, J.E. "Theory and Design of Loudspeaker Enclosures, Part 3 – Introduction to Synthesis of Vented Systems", Amalgamated Wireless Australia Technical Review, (1972)
- Benson, J.E. "An Introduction to the Design of Filtered Loudspeaker Systems", Amalgamated Wireless Australia Technical Review, (1973) (reprinted JAES Volume 23 Issue 7 pp. 536–545; September 1975)
- Benson, J.E. "Synthesis of High-Pass Filtered Loudspeaker Systems, Part 1 – Isolated Filters Driving Second-Order (Closed-Box) Systems", Amalgamated Wireless Australia Technical Review, (1974 June) (reprinted JAES Volume 27 Issue 7/8 pp. 548–561; August 1979)
- Benson, J.E. "Synthesis of High-Pass Filtered Loudspeaker Systems, Part 1 (a) – IA Supplementary Note on QB2, SC3 and SC4 Alignments", Amalgamated Wireless Australia Technical Review, (1974 December) (JAES Volume 27 Issue 9 pp. 667–672; September 1979)
- Benson, J.E. "Synthesis of High-Pass Filtered Loudspeaker Systems, Part 2 – Isolated Filters Driving Fourth-Order (Reflex) Systems", Amalgamated Wireless Australia Technical Review, (1975 June) (reprinted JAES Volume 27 Issue 10 pp. 769–779; October 1979)
