= Albert Brault =

American chemist and inventor

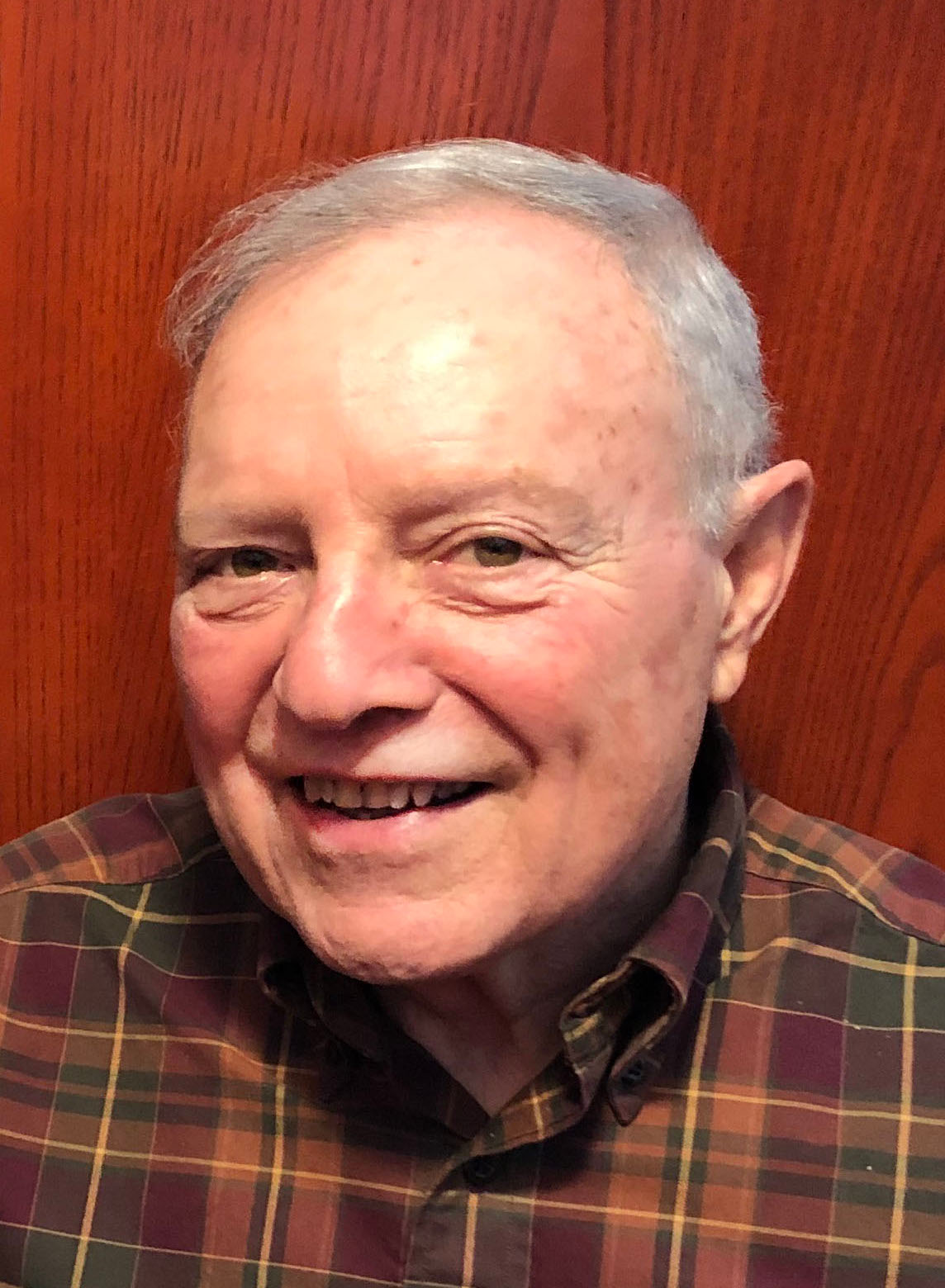
Albert Brault, 2019

Albert Thomas Brault (born May 24, 1937) is an American chemist who invented the fabrication process used for the first integral color image sensors. The curator of the Technology Collection at the George Eastman Museum, Todd Gustavson, has stated that "the color sensor technology developed by Albert Brault has revolutionized all forms of color photography. These color sensors are now ubiquitous in products such as smart phone cameras, digital cameras and camcorders, digital cinema cameras, medical cameras, automobile cameras, and drones".

== Early life and education ==
Brault was born in Barton, Vermont, the son of Innocence Elizabeth and Maurice Albert Brault. He attended Cathedral High School in Springfield, Massachusetts. He distinguished himself by graduating magna cum laude from Saint Michaels College in Winooski, Vermont in 1959, and received a PhD in Physical Chemistry from Northwestern University in 1964.

== Early career ==
Brault was hired directly into the Kodak Research Laboratories (KRL) after receiving his PhD in 1964, and primarily focused on innovations in color photography. After 10 years of research in conventional imaging systems, Brault transferred to the Physics Division of KRL in 1973, which was focused on solid state devices and image processing. This move was motivated by his perception that the most innovative science was being done at the overlapping interface of scientific fields.

== Integral color image sensors ==
Soon after joining the Physics Division, Brault was introduced to KRL physicist Peter L. P. Dillon. Dillon was developing a small color video camera module for a one-piece camera / recorder (now known as a camcorder) to replace home movie cameras which used 8mm film. Dillon had recognized the possibility of capturing color images using only one charge-coupled device (CCD) image sensor, by selectively sensitizing some of the sensor's pixels to only capture red light, some to only capture green light, and the remainder to only capture blue light. Dillon had already asked his Kodak colleague Bryce Bayer to determine what color pattern to use, and had developed the signal processing technique needed to produce a full color image for video display. The remaining challenge Dillon faced was how to fabricate the Color Filter Array (CFA) he had envisioned. The collaboration that Brault so dearly wanted was born at that moment.

Brault's knowledge and experience enabled him to quickly recognize that a CFA meeting Dillon's requirements could be fabricated using sublimable dyes deposited onto a suitable substrate through photo-resist masks. He knew that this CFA technique was compatible with current integrated circuit fabrication and could be integrated directly into the CCD fabrication process.

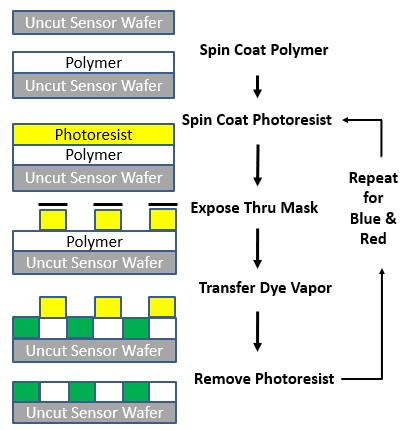
Process for fabricating integral color filters

The figure on the right, adapted from a figure in the 1976 paper "Integral color filter arrays for solid state imagers" by Dillon, Brault, et al. depicts Brault's process for fabricating integral color filters. After a wafer of monochrome sensors is fabricated, a polymer and a photoresist (shown in yellow) was coated on top. Since Kodak was manufacturing photoresists at the time, Brault was familiar with this technology. The photoresist was exposed through a mask, and the sublimable dye (shown in green) was transferred by vapor deposition into the polymer. The photoresist was removed, and the process was repeated for the red and blue filters.

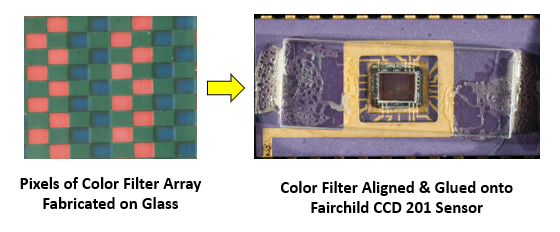
First color image sensor

Since Kodak had not yet developed working CCD image sensors, Brault fabricated the first CFA on a small glass plate. The glass plate coated with the CFA was registered and bonded to the top of an existing CCD sensor made by Fairchild, from which the cover glass had been removed. The performance of the CFA itself, and the combination of the CFA and monochrome CCD, were reported in a 1978 paper.

== Career transition ==
Brault's career pivoted to human resource management in 1978. He held the position of director of human resource management for the Kodak Research Laboratories and the Life Sciences Business Group. He later served as the executive director of the Center for Advanced Human Resource Studies at Cornell University from 1989 to 1996, and the Senior Human Resource Executive at the University of Rochester from 1996 to 2001.

After retiring in 2001, Brault wrote a book entitled, "Human Resources Adding Value in Higher Education", for which he received the distinguished Kathryn G. Hansen Publication Award from CUPA in 2004.

== Technical honors and awards ==
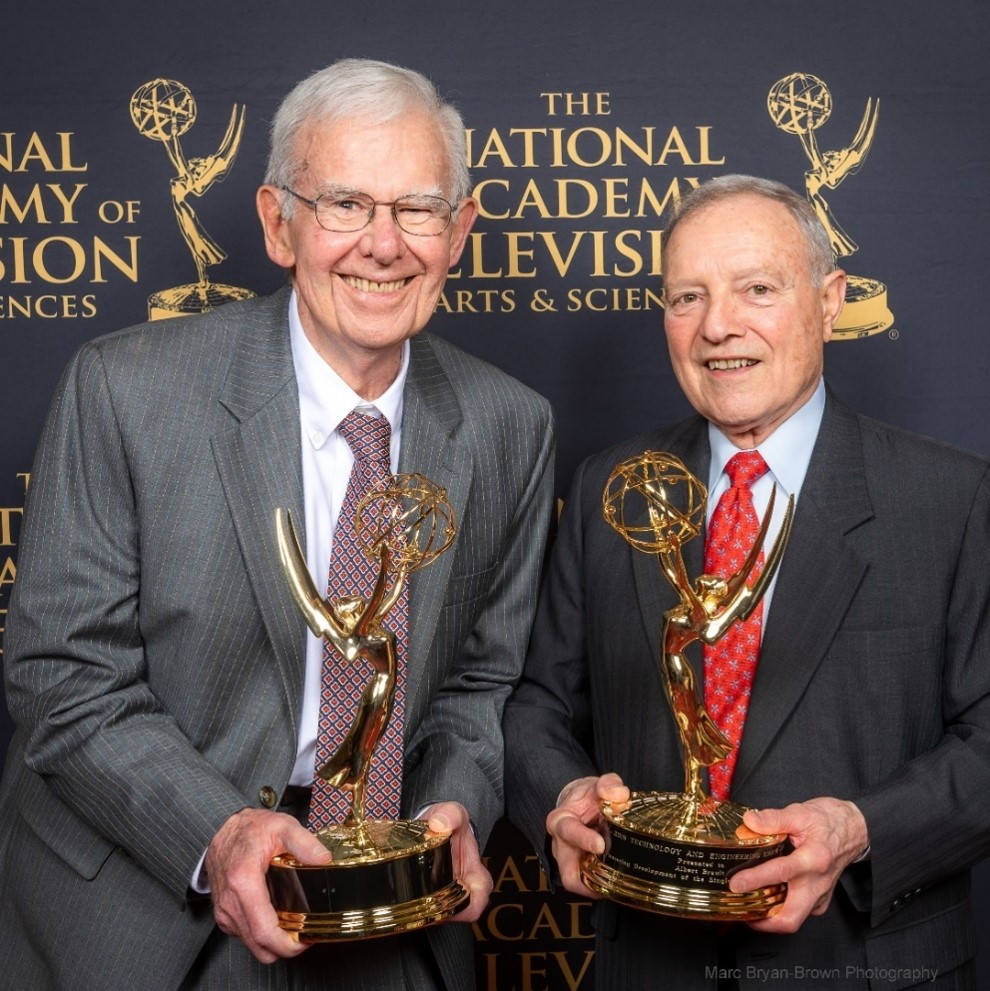
Peter Dillon (left) and Albert Brault (right), 2019

Albert Brault and Peter Dillon both received Technology and Engineering Emmy Awards in 2019 for "Pioneering Development of the Single-Chip Color Camera". In 2022, they received the IEEE Masaru Ibuka Consumer Electronics Award for "Contributions to the development of image sensors with integrated color filter arrays for digital video and still cameras".
