= Norman W. V. Hayes Medal =

Australian award for a published paper

The Norman W. V. Hayes Medal was awarded by the Institution of Radio and Electronics Engineers (IREE), Australia, annually for the most meritorious paper published in the Proceedings of the Institution of Radio and Electronics Engineers Australia during the preceding year. Adjudication alternated between the Institute of Electrical & Electronics Engineers (New York) and the Institution of Electrical Engineers (London). It was named in honour of Norman William Victor Hayes (1891-1950) who was originally communications engineer at the Postmaster-General's Department, and then later president of the Institution of Radio and Electronics Engineers until his death. The inaugural medal was in 1951.

== Recipients ==
- 1951 Donald Gordon Lindsay, AWA
- 1960 Albert Jakob Seyler, University of Melbourne
- 1964 Albert Jakob Seyler, University of Melbourne
- 1968 Albert Neville Thiele, Australian Broadcasting Corporation
- 1968 Thomas Albert Pascoe, Philips Electrical
- 1970 Albert Neville Thiele, Australian Broadcasting Corporation
- 1971 Alan M. Fowler, Telecom Research Laboratories
- 1972 Harro Brueggemann, Graeme Kidd, Lawerence K. (Laurie) Mackechnie, and Albert Jakob Seyler, Australian Post Office Research Laboratories
- 1978 Edward M. Cherry, Monash University
- 1980 Robert Henry (Bob) Frater, CSIRO
- 1980 David James Skellern, Macquarie University
- 1981 Harry E. Green, University of New South Wales
- 1982 Peter J. Hall, University of Tasmania, Phillip Alexander (Pip) Hamilton, Deakin University, and Peter M. McCulloch
- 1989 Bruce R. Davis, University of Adelaide
- 1992 Albert Neville Thiele, University of New South Wales

== See also ==
- List of engineering awards
- List of prizes named after people
