= RGBE =

RGBE – RGB (Red, Green, Blue) + E, may refer to:

- RGBE filter – RGB + Emerald
- RGBE image format – RGB + Exponent
