= Peter L. P. Dillon =

American physicist (1934–2026)

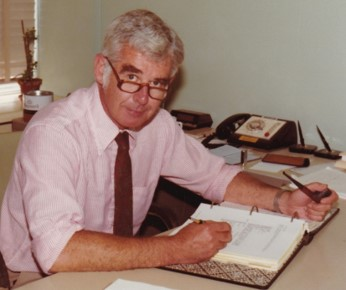
Dillon, c. 1970s

Peter L. P. Dillon (March 22, 1934 – April 30, 2026) was an American physicist, and the inventor of integral color image sensors and single-chip color video cameras. The curator of the Technology Collection at the George Eastman Museum, Todd Gustavson, has stated that "the color sensor technology developed by Peter Dillon has revolutionized all forms of color photography. These color sensors are now ubiquitous in products such as smart phone cameras, digital cameras and camcorders, digital cinema cameras, medical cameras, automobile cameras, and drones". Dillon joined Kodak Research Labs in 1959 and retired from Kodak in 1991.

== Early life and education ==
Peter Lewis Presnall Dillon was born in Richmond, Virginia, on March 22, 1934 to Margaret (Knight) Dillon and Jesse William Dillon, and was married for 52 years to Ann (Wright) Dillon. He attended the University of Virginia where he received a bachelor's degree in physics in 1956. Upon graduation, he was awarded a Fulbright Fellowship at Cambridge University, England. He joined Kodak Research Labs (KRL) in 1959.

== Integral color image sensors ==
In early 1974, KRL began an effort to develop a one-piece color video camera / recorder (now known as a camcorder), to replace home movie cameras which used 8mm film. Work on the magnetic recorder portion was headed by James U. Lemke, while Peter Dillon was responsible for the camera portion. KRL had already begun research related to charge coupled devices (CCDs), which were invented in the late 1960s at Bell Labs. But CCD sensors only captured black and white (i.e., monochrome) images. At the time, a color CCD camera required three sensors and a color beam splitter (e.g., a prism), making it too bulky and expensive for a handheld camcorder.

In 1974, Dillon conceived the idea of fabricating a pattern of color filters directly on top of the individual pixels of a CCD image sensor, during the latter steps of the wafer fabrication process. He recognized that such a color filter array (CFA) would selectively sensitize some of the sensor's pixels to only capture red light, some to only capture green light, and the remainder to only capture blue light. After working with his KRL colleagues to fabricate the CFA and develop the circuitry needed for a single-chip color camera, Dillon presented his work at an IEEE conference in December 1976.

To determine the best color pattern to use, Dillon consulted his KRL colleague Bryce Bayer. In response, Bayer invented a pattern having 50% green pixels arranged in a checkerboard, with alternate rows of red and blue pixels in between, which is now widely known as the “Bayer filter”. However, the Bayer CFA was incompatible with the interlaced readout used in NTSC television scanning, since red and blue appear only on alternate lines and therefore only in alternate fields. Dillon then invented an alternative CFA pattern, with a green checkerboard, and both red and blue colored pixels on each line. He used this pattern for the color CCD sensor (shown in the below figure) in the single chip camera he developed.

In order to develop a color filter array fabrication process which was compatible with semiconductor fabrication processes, Dillon collaborated with his Kodak colleague, KRL Physical Chemist Albert Brault. Brault invented a process using dye sublimation through photoresist windows onto a receiving polymer layer that was coated on top of the pixels of a CCD image sensor during the wafer fabrication stage. As a result, the color filters could be simultaneously applied to the hundreds of image sensor chips being fabricated on the same wafer before the chips were diced and packaged. This made the process very economical.

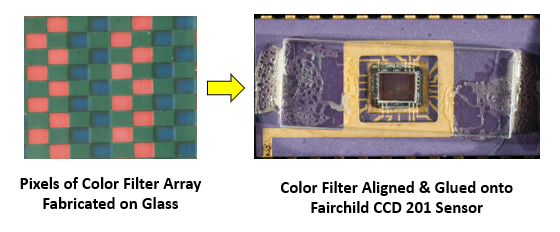
First color CCD image sensor

Since Kodak had not yet developed working CCD image sensors, KRL fabricated the first CFA (using Dillon's CFA pattern) on a small glass plate. The glass plate coated with the CFA was registered and bonded to the top of an existing 100 x 100 pixel CCD sensor made by Fairchild, from which the cover glass had been removed. The performance of the CFA itself, and the combination of the CFA and monochrome CCD, were reported in a 1978 paper.

== Single-chip color camera processing ==
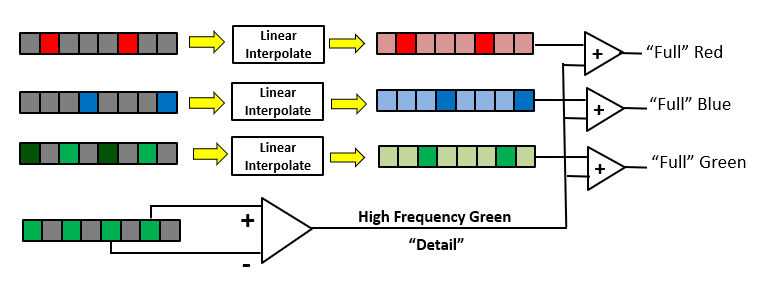
Color image interpolation (Demosaicing)

Dillon incorporated this 100 x 100 pixel color image sensor in the world's first single-chip color video camera, which he described in an IEEE paper published in February 1978. Dillon and Bayer invented the image processing algorithm and circuitry used in the camera, which is described U.S. Patent No. 4,176,373. This patent describes the signal processing circuitry used to create full red, green, and blue camera output signals from the CFA pixel values. The circuitry samples the sensor's output signal at the appropriate times, in order to decode the color pattern, and then interpolates intermediate values between the samples. It processes the green pixels to produce a high spatial frequency luminance signal, which is added to the three low spatial frequency color channels, as shown in the figure. Today, all single-sensor color cameras use a more sophisticated version of this fundamental approach, now known as “demosaicing”.

Dillon is responsible for another important video camera technology, which extends the range of operation at low light levels. As described in U.S. Patent No. 4,016,597, Dillon and his KRL colleague Jim DePalma recognized that integral color image sensors are sensitive to infrared (IR) wavelengths. As a result, color video cameras must include an Infrared (IR) blocking filter in order to obtain proper color reproduction. They demonstrated that, by automatically removing the IR blocking filter at very low light levels, the sensitivity could be significantly increased to produce acceptable monochrome images. This invention is widely used today to provide a "night vision" feature in camcorders and color video security cameras.

== Personal life and death ==
Dillon lived in Pittsford, New York. He died on April 30, 2026, at the age of 92.

== Honors and awards ==
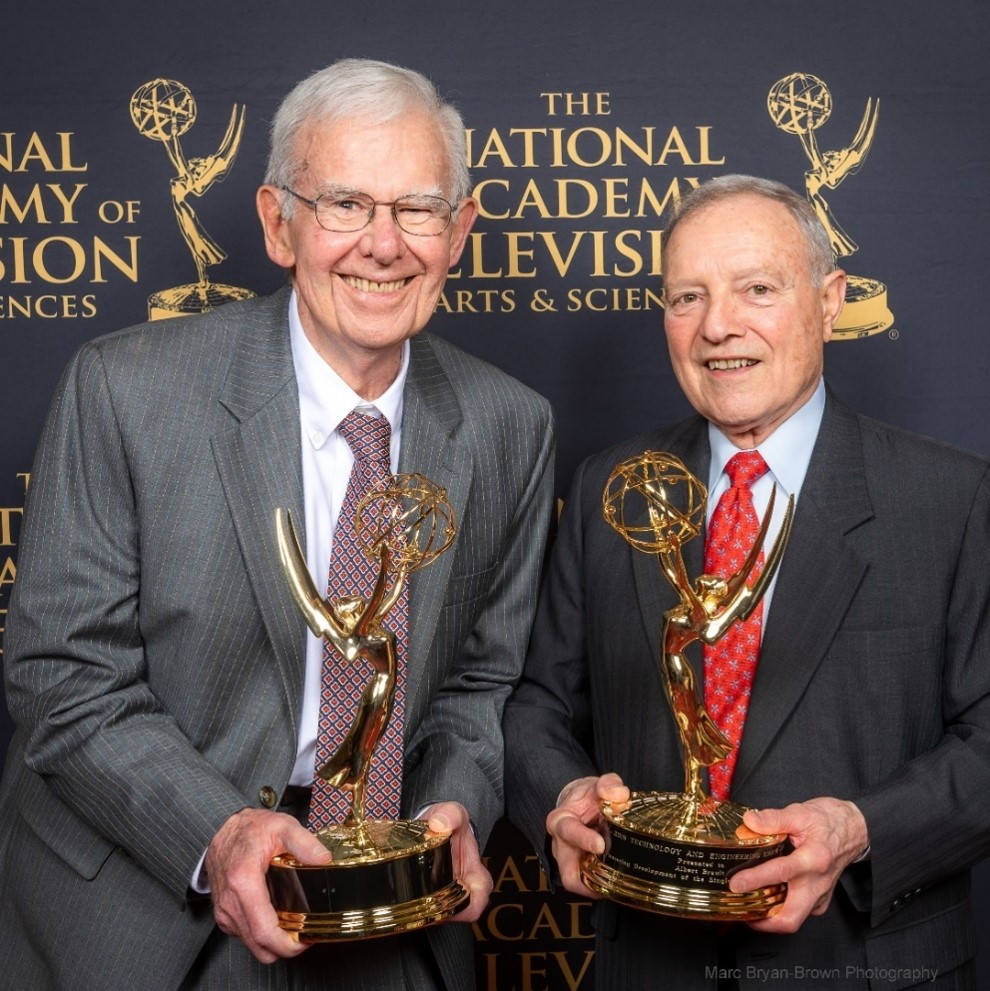
Dillon (left) and Albert Brault (right) holding their Emmy statues

Dillon and Albert Brault both received Technology and Engineering Emmy Awards in 2019 for “Pioneering Development of the Single-Chip Color Camera”. In 2022, they received the IEEE Masaru Ibuka Consumer Electronics Award for “Contributions to the development of image sensors with integrated color filter arrays for digital video and still cameras".
