= CYGM =

CYGM may refer to:

- Gimli Industrial Park Airport in Gimli, Manitoba, Canada (ICAO airport code)
- CYGM filter (cyan, yellow, green, magenta) to produce colour images on some charge-coupled devices
