= Nicholas J. Phillips =

British physicist

Nick Phillips
- Nicholas John Phillips wearing a holographic bolo tie, c. 2003.
- Born: 26 September 1933; Finchley, London, United Kingdom
- Died: 23 May 2009 (aged 75); Loughborough, United Kingdom
- Citizenship: British
- Education: Imperial College
- Known for: Display Holograms; Phillips-Bjelkhagen Ultimate (PBU)
- Awards: Thomas Young Medal (1981)
- Scientific career
- Fields: Physicist
- Workplaces: De Montfort University (DMU); Loughborough University (LUT); Sperry Rand Research Centre; English Electric; AWRE Aldermaston

Nicholas John Phillips (26 September 1933 – 23 May 2009) was an English physicist, notable for the development of photochemical processing techniques for the colour hologram. Holograms typically used to have low signal-to-noise ratios, and Phillips is credited as the pioneer of silver halide holographic processing techniques for producing high-quality reflection holograms.

== Career ==
Phillips graduated with a BSc degree in physics from Imperial College, London. He was a senior researcher at the Atomic Weapons Research Establishment (AWRE), Aldermaston, from 1959 to 1962. He was a research scientist at the Sperry Rand Research Centre, Sudbury, Massachusetts, United States, from 1962 to 1963. He was a theoretical physicist at English Electric, Whetstone, Leicester, UK, from 1963 to 1965.

From 1965 to 1993, he was appointed at Loughborough University, where he rose to Professor of Applied Optics. In October 1993, he was appointed as Professor of Imaging Science at De Montfort University, Leicester, UK. Phillips was the co-founder in the early 1970s of Holoco, who using lasers supplied by The Who (that had been used in laser light shows during their concerts), constructed the Light Fantastic exhibitions as The Royal Academy of Arts, London, in 1977–8.

The company became Advanced Holographics in 1980 when The Who withdrew their financial backing, and was based in Loughborough, UK, and later became part of Markem Systems.

== Research and achievements ==
Phillips is credited with the development of bleaching and processing techniques, which made it possible to record multi-color reflection holograms from a single wavelength laser. His research interests include holographic displays, edge-lit holograms, optical encoding for security, photopolymers, and novel micro-optic systems, and he has numerous patents in these areas.

== Holographic art ==
Phillips developed a technique for producing white light holograms that work in dim lighting conditions, which are now widely used in the world of holographic art.

== Awards ==
Phillips was awarded the Institute of Physics Thomas Young Medal (1981) in recognition for contributions to holography, particularly the development of high quality holograms for visual display. He is a Fellow of the Institute of Physics.

== Selected publications by Phillips ==
- N. J. Phillips and D. Porter, "An advance in the processing of holograms," Journal of Physics E: Scientific Instruments (1976) p. 631
- N. J. Phillips, A. A. Ward, R. Cullen, and D. Porter, "Advances in holographic bleaches," Photographic Science and Engineering, 24 (1980) p. 120.
- N. J. Phillips, H. Heyworth, and T. Hare, "On Lippmann's photography," Journal of Photographic Science, 32 (1984) pp. 158–169.
- N. J. Phillips and R. A. J. van der Werf, "The creation of efficient reflective Lippmann layers in ultra-fine grain silver halide materials using non-laser sources," Journal of Photographic Science, 33 (1985) pp. 22–28,
- N. J. Phillips, "Benign bleaching for healthy holography," Holosphere, 14(4) (1986) p. 21.
- N. J. Phillips, "The silver halides—the workhorse of the holography business," Proceedings of the International Symposium of Display Holography, 3 (1988) p. 35.
- D. Abbott, B. R. Davis, N. J. Phillips, and K. Eshraghian, "Simple derivation of the thermal noise formula using window-limited Fourier transforms," IEEE Trans. Education, 39(1) (1996) pp. 1–13.
