= CYGM filter =

Alternative color filter array

Example CYGM pattern

CYGM pattern on an image sensor in isometric perspective

CYGM sensor spectral response

In digital photography, the CYGM filter is an alternative color filter array to the Bayer filter (GRGB). It similarly uses a mosaic of pixel filters, of cyan, yellow, green and magenta, and so also requires demosaicing to produce a full-color image.

== Overview ==
CYGM gives more accurate luminance information than the Bayer filter, hence a wider dynamic range, but at the expense of color accuracy. This is because the cyan and yellow components of the colour filter array do not produce a true monochromatic yellow or cyan but are rather modifications of the filters used to absorb 'color'. Under the conventional trichromatic theory, a 'green' measurement is taken by placing a color filter which absorbs 'red' and 'blue' in front of the light sensor. A 'blue' measurement is taken with a 'green' and 'red' absorbing filter, and a 'red' measurement with a 'blue' and 'green' absorbing filter. RGB is therefore derived by using filters which each absorb 2/3 of the spectrum for each measurement. This means in practice that much of the light that falls upon the sensor array is absorbed by the filters (which typically employ dyes to absorb light within a broad range of wavelengths). The CYGM color filter array differs from the standard Bayer filter by using only a single color-absorbing filter for 3 of the 4 sensors. This produces a broad spectral response and therefore makes measurements more accurate in respect to luminance (that is, taking measurements of how much light there is) but makes it more difficult to determine color information accurately. While 'green' is unaffected, color inaccuracy arises from the fact that the red and blue sensors (as found in the standard Bayer filter) are in effect conflated into 'magenta' and 'cyan' sensors. This is shown by a graph of the spectral response of the CYGM sensor.

While the CYGM filter found widespread adoption in the early years of digital photography, at the time a rival of the now standard Bayer filter, it is now considered obsolete. CCDs that used it include the 3 megapixel Sony ICX252AK and ICS252AKF (which sampled in October 1999.)

CCDs with a CYGM color filter array were initially adopted by both Canon and Nikon when these companies transitioned from film photography to digital. Many Canon models of the 1999–2000 period, such as the PowerShot S10, the Canon Digital IXUS S100 (June 2000), and the Canon PowerShot G1 used sensors with this colour filter arrangement. Whereas Canon adopted the now standard Bayer filter across its entire range when it introduced the DSLR, Nikon continued to produce and sell a range of mid-range enthusiast digital cameras using CYGM sensors for a period of approximately 5 years. From the prominent Nikon Coolpix 995 (still used a decade later in specialist applications like microscopy) to the Nikon Coolpix 5700 (the last Nikon camera to use CYGM).

Additionally, Panasonic also used CCDs with a CYGM filter array. These were internally referred to as 'complementary color filters'.

== List of cameras with a CYGM colour filter array ==
Camera	Sensor size	Resolution	Release date
Nikon Coolpix 3500	1/2.7"	3.2 MP	19 September 2002
Nikon Coolpix 4300	1/1.8"	4.1 MP	29 August 2002
Nikon Coolpix 4500	1/1.8"	4.0 MP	29 May 2002
Nikon Coolpix 5700	2/3"	5.0 MP	29 May 2002
Leica Digilux 1	1/1.8"	4.0 MP	14 March 2002
Nikon Coolpix 2500	1/2.7"	2.0 MP	21 February 2002
Panasonic Lumix DMC-LC40	1/1.8"	4.0 MP	11 January 2002
Panasonic Lumix DMC-LC5	1/1.8"	4.0 MP	11 January 2002
Nikon Coolpix 5000	2/3"	5.0 MP	18 September 2001
Nikon Coolpix 885	1/1.8"	3.2 MP	23 August 2001
Nikon Coolpix 775	1/2.7"	2.1 MP	25 April 2001
Nikon Coolpix 995	1/1.8"	3.14 MP	25 April 2001
Canon PowerShot Pro90 IS	1/1.8"	2.6 MP	6 January 2001
Canon PowerShot G1	1/1.8"	3.14 MP	18 October 2000
Nikon Coolpix 880	1/1.8"	3.24 MP	28 August 2000
Nikon Coolpix 990	1/1.8"	3.24 MP	27 January 2000
Canon PowerShot S20	1/1.8"	3.14 MP	6 January 2000
Nikon Coolpix 800	1/2.0"	2.1 MP	27 September 1999
Canon PowerShot S10	1/2.0"	2.11 MP	27 August 1999
Canon PowerShot A50	1/3.0"	1.2 MP	30 March 1999
Canon PowerShot A5 ZOOM	1/3.0"	0.7 MP	18 February 1999
Nikon Coolpix 700	1/2.0"	2.11 MP	15 February 1999
Nikon Coolpix 950	1/2.0"	2.11 MP	15 February 1999
Nikon Coolpix 900S	1/2.7"	1.2 MP	26 October 1998
Canon PowerShot A5	1/3.0"	0.7 MP	27 March 1998
Nikon Coolpix 900	1/2.7"	1.2 MP	16 March 1998
Canon PowerShot Pro 70	1/2.0"	1.5 MP	27 February 1998
Canon PowerShot 350	1/3.0"	0.3 MP	16 July 1997
Canon PowerShot 600	1/3.0"	0.5 MP	13 May 1996

== See also ==
- Color filter array
- Bayer filter
- RGBE filter
- CYYM filter
- Foveon X3 sensor
