= Electrical characteristics of dynamic loudspeakers =

The chief electrical characteristic of a dynamic loudspeaker's driver is its electrical impedance as a function of frequency. It can be visualized by plotting it as a graph, called the impedance curve.

== Explanation ==
The most common driver type is an electro-mechanical transducer using a voice coil rigidly connected to a diaphragm (generally a cone). Other types have similar connections, though differing in detail, between their acoustical environment and their electrical properties.

The voice coil in moving coil drivers is suspended in a magnetic field provided by the loudspeaker magnet structure. As electric current flows through the voice coil (from an electronic amplifier), the magnetic field created by the coil reacts against the magnet's fixed field and moves the voice coil (and so the cone). Alternating current will move the cone back and forth.

Mathematical models, and their equivalent electrical circuits, can provide a quantitative description of the effects described below.

=== Resonance ===
The moving system of the loudspeaker—consisting of the cone, cone suspension, spider, and voice coil—can be modeled as an effective mass (spring–mass system), a mass suspended by a spring. This system has a characteristic mass and stiffness, and a resonant frequency at which the system will vibrate freely.

This frequency is known as the free-space resonance of the loudspeaker and is designated by F_{s}. At this frequency, the voice coil is vibrating in the speaker's magnetic field with maximum peak-to-peak amplitude and velocity. The back EMF generated by this movement is also at its maximum. The electrical impedance of the speaker varies with the back EMF and thus with the applied frequency. The impedance is at its maximum at F_{s}, shown as Z_{max} in the graph.

For frequencies just below resonance, the impedance rises rapidly as the frequency increases towards F_{s} and is inductive in nature. At resonance, the impedance is purely resistive. As the frequency increases above F_{s}, the impedance drops—it behaves capacitively. The impedance reaches a minimum value, Z_{min}, at some frequency where the behaviour is fairly resistive over some range. A speaker's rated, or nominal, impedance (Z_{nom}) is derived from this Z_{min} value, explained ahead.

Beyond the Z_{min} point the impedance is again largely inductive and continues to rise gradually with frequency. The frequency F_{s} and the frequencies above and below it where the impedance is 1/√2Z_{max} are important in determining the loudspeaker's T/S parameters. These can be used, for example, to design a suitable enclosure for the driver, especially for low frequency drivers. In fact F_{s} is itself one of the Thiele/Small parameters.

== Load impedance and amplifiers ==
The variation in loudspeaker impedance is a consideration in audio amplifier design. Among other things, amplifiers designed to cope with such variations are more reliable. There are two main factors to consider when matching a speaker to an amplifier.

=== Minimum impedance ===
This is the minimum value in the impedance vs. frequency relationship, which is always higher than the DC resistance of the voice coil, i.e., as measured by an ohmmeter. Minimum impedance is significant because the lower the impedance, the higher the current must be at the same drive voltage. The output devices of an amplifier are rated for a certain maximum current level, and when this is exceeded the device(s) sometimes, more or less promptly, fail.

=== Nominal impedance ===
Diagram showing the variation in impedance of a typical mid-range loudspeaker. Nominal impedance is usually determined at the lowest point after resonance. However, it is possible for the low-frequency impedance to be still lower than this.

Due to the reactive nature of a speaker's impedance over the audio band frequencies, giving a speaker a single value for impedance rating is in principle impossible, as one may surmise from the impedance–vs.–frequency curve shown. The nominal impedance of a loudspeaker is a convenient, single number reference that loosely describes the impedance value of the loudspeaker over a majority of the audio band. A speaker's nominal impedance is defined as:

$$Z_\mathrm{nom} = 1.15 \cdot Z_\mathrm{min}$$

The graph shows the impedance curve of a single loudspeaker driver in free-air (unmounted in any type of enclosure). A home hi-fi loudspeaker system typically consists of two or more drivers, an electrical crossover network to divide the signal by frequency band and route them appropriately to the drivers, and an enclosure that all these components are mounted in. The impedance curve of such a system can be very complex, and the simple formula above does not as easily apply.

The nominal impedance rating of consumer loudspeakers systems can aid in choosing the correct loudspeaker for a given amplifier (or vice versa). If a home hi-fi amplifier specifies 8 ohm or greater loads, care should be taken that loudspeakers with a lower impedance are not used, lest the amplifier be required to produce more current than it was designed to handle. Using a 4 ohm loudspeaker system on an amplifier specifying 8 ohms or greater could lead to amplifier failure.

=== Impedance phase angle ===
Impedance variations of the load with frequency translate into variation in the phase relationship between the amplifier's voltage and current outputs. For a resistive load, usually (but not always) the voltage across the amplifier's output devices is maximum when the load current is minimum (and the voltage is minimum across the load) and vice versa, and as a result the power dissipation in those devices is least. But due to the complex and variable nature of the driver/crossover load and its effect on the phase relationship between the voltage and current, the current will not necessarily be at its minimum when the voltage across the output devices is maximum – this results in increased power dissipation in the amplifier output stage which manifests as heating in the output devices. The phase angle varies most near resonance in moving coil loudspeakers. If this point is not taken into consideration during the amplifier design, the amplifier may overheat causing it to shut down, or cause failure of the output devices. See Power factor for more detail.

=== Damping issues ===
A loudspeaker acts as a generator when a coil is moving in a magnetic field. When the loudspeaker coil moves in response to a signal from the amplifier, the coil generates a back EMF that resists the amplifier signal and resists the coil movement. The braking effect is critical to speaker design, in that designers leverage it to ensure the speaker stops making sound quickly and that the coil is in position to reproduce the next sound. The electrical signal generated by the coil travels back along the speaker cable to the amplifier. Well-designed amplifiers have low output impedance so that this generated signal has minimal effect on the amplifier.

Characteristically, solid state amplifiers have had much lower output impedances than tube amplifiers. So much so, that differences in practice between a 16-ohm nominal impedance driver and a 4-ohm nominal impedance driver have not been important enough to adjust for. The amplifier damping factor, which is the ratio of the nominal load impedance (driver voice coil) to amplifier output impedance, is adequate in either case for well-designed solid state amplifiers.

Tube amplifiers have sufficiently higher output impedances that they normally included multi-tap output transformers to better match to the driver impedance. Sixteen ohm drivers (or loudspeakers systems) would be connected to the 16-ohm tap, 8 ohm to the 8 ohm tap, etc.

This is significant since the ratio between the loudspeaker impedance and the amplifier's impedance at a particular frequency provides damping (i.e., energy absorption) for the back EMF generated by a driver. In practice, this is important to prevent ringing or overhang which is, essentially, a free vibration of the moving structures in a driver when it is excited (i.e., driven with a signal) at that frequency. This can be clearly seen in waterfall measurement plots. A properly adjusted damping factor can control this free vibration of the moving structures and improve the sound of the driver.

== See also ==
- Thiele/Small parameters
