= Joan L. Mitchell =

American computer scientist and inventor

- A JPEG picture of Joan L. Mitchell
- Born: May 24, 1947; Modesto, California, U.S.
- Died: December 2, 2015 (aged 68); Laguna Hills, California, U.S.
- Education: Stanford University, University of Illinois at Urbana–Champaign
- Known for: Co-inventor of JPEG digital image format.
- Relatives: Eulalia Richardson Mitchell (grandmother, Physicist)

Joan Laverne Mitchell (May 24, 1947 – December 2, 2015) was an American computer scientist, data compression pioneer, and inventor who, as a researcher at IBM, co-invented the JPEG digital image format.

== Early life ==
Mitchell was born on May 24, 1947, in Modesto, California. Mitchell's father was William Mitchell and her mother was Doris Mitchell.

== Education ==
Mitchell was a National Merit Scholar at Stanford University, where her work included an independent study project on Brillouin scattering in bromine. In 1969, Mitchell graduated with a Bachelor of Science degree in physics from Stanford University with distinction and Phi Beta Kappa. She followed in the footsteps of her grandmother, Eulalia Richardson Mitchell, who also earned Stanford physics degrees in 1910 and 1912.

Mitchell went on to graduate study in condensed matter physics at the University of Illinois at Urbana–Champaign, and earned a master's degree in 1971 and a Ph.D. in 1974 there. As part of her Ph.D. work, she also learned computer programming, so that she could use a computer to solve the differential equations arising in her research. Her dissertation, Effect of heterovalent impurities co-diffusing with monovalent tracers in ionic crystals, was supervised by David Lazarus.

== Career and later life ==
Mitchell began working at the IBM Thomas J. Watson Research Center in 1974, in the Exploratory Printing Technologies Group. There, her inventions included a method for ultrasonic printing, a method for thermal-transfer printing later used in some models of the IBM Selectric typewriter, data compression for fax machines, a teleconferencing system, and the Q-coder method for arithmetic coding used in JBIG image compression. From 1987 to 1994, Mitchell helped develop the JPEG standard, and she became a co-author with Bill Pennebaker of the first book on the standard. Gregory K. Wallace, another member of the group, remembers Mitchell and Pennebaker as "two of the most insightful, energetic, and prolific members" of the Joint Photographic Experts Group.

During the mid-1990s Mitchell moved from the Watson Research Center to a different IBM group in Vermont and then (after a short leave as a visiting professor at the University of Illinois) to IBM's Printing Systems Division in Colorado. In 2007 IBM sold their Printing Systems Division to Ricoh, and Mitchell went with them to the resulting joint venture, InfoPrint Solutions. She retired in 2009, and died on December 2, 2015 while living in Laguna Hills, California.

== Recognition ==
Mitchell became an IEEE Fellow in 1999 "for contributions to the development of international image compression standards", an IBM Fellow in 2001, and, in 2004, a member of the National Academy of Engineering "for leadership in setting standards for the formation of photographic fax and image compression". She was the 2011 winner of the IEEE Masaru Ibuka Consumer Electronics Award, and is listed in the Hall of Fame of distinguished alumni of the University of Illinois at Urbana–Champaign.

== Books ==
Mitchell is the author of:

- JPEG: Still Image Data Compression Standard (with William B. Pennebaker, Van Nostrand Reinhold, 1992)
- MPEG Video Compression Standard (with William B. Pennebaker, Chad Fogg, and Didier J. LeGall, Chapman and Hall, 1996)
- Dr. Joan's Mentoring Book: Straight Talk about Taking Charge of Your Career (with Nancy Walker-Mitchell, 2007)
