= Telstra Research Laboratories =

Australian telecommunications research centre

- TRL in 1983 from the antenna towers on Building M5
- Established: 1923
- Research type: Telecommunications research and development
- Field of research: Telecommunications
- Location: Melbourne, Victoria, Australia
- Affiliations: Telstra
- Operating agency: Telstra

Telstra Research Laboratories (TRL) was a leading telecommunications research and development centre in Australia up until its closure in January 2006. Shortly before its closure it employed several hundred people including engineers, scientists, psychologists and other technical staff spread over several locations including Melbourne, Sydney and Launceston.

The closure of TRL, with retrenchment of about 90% of its staff, was part of a broader restructure of Telstra's Network and Technology group following the announcement in November 2005 of the outcome of a strategic review led by new CEO Sol Trujillo. The new operating model places more emphasis on the reliance on key vendor partners, rather than the traditional in-house expertise that TRL provided to assist Telstra in being an intelligent purchaser of equipment and systems. Whilst in operation the Centre was under the management of Ross Lambi Chief Infrastructure Offer and Brendon Riley CEO of Telstra InfraCo who then reported to Sol Trujillo Telstra’s USA born CEO from 2005 to 2009.

Telstra is Australia's dominant telecommunications carrier.

== History ==
TRL was originally established as the Research Laboratories of the Postmaster-General's Department (PMG) in 1923. The Research Laboratories continued as PMG, became Telecom Australia and later became Telstra, and was responsible for the development of several key technologies. Notable achievements included: a part in the development of radar for WW2; the first fax service in Australia; the first public TV broadcast in Australia; developing termite-resistant cabling; assisting with the development of the bionic ear and the cochlear ear implant; developing the optical fibre cold clamp; and building the first system to route calls to a destination depending on the caller's location (One3).
