= Thiele/Small parameters =

Set of electromechanical parameters

Thiele/Small parameters (commonly abbreviated T/S parameters, or TSP) are a set of electromechanical parameters that define the specified low frequency performance of a loudspeaker driver. These parameters are published in specification sheets by driver manufacturers so that designers have a guide in selecting off-the-shelf drivers for loudspeaker designs. Using these parameters, a loudspeaker designer may simulate the position, velocity and acceleration of the diaphragm, the input impedance and the sound output of a system comprising a loudspeaker and enclosure. Many of the parameters are strictly defined only at the resonant frequency, but the approach is generally applicable in the frequency range where the diaphragm motion is largely pistonic, i.e., when the entire cone moves in and out as a unit without cone breakup.

Rather than purchase off-the-shelf components, loudspeaker design engineers often define desired performance and work backwards to a set of parameters and manufacture a driver with said characteristics or order it from a driver manufacturer. This process of generating parameters from a target response is known as synthesis. Thiele/Small parameters are named after A. Neville Thiele of the Australian Broadcasting Commission, and Richard H. Small of the University of Sydney, who pioneered this line of analysis for loudspeakers. A common use of Thiele/Small parameters is in designing PA system and hi-fi speaker enclosures; the TSP calculations indicate to the speaker design professionals how large a speaker cabinet will need to be and how large and long the bass reflex port (if it is used) should be.

== History ==
The 1925 paper of Chester W. Rice and Edward W. Kellogg, fueled by advances in radio and electronics, increased interest in direct radiator loudspeakers. In 1930, A. J. Thuras of Bell Labs patented (US Patent No. 1869178) his "Sound Translating Device" (essentially a vented box) which was evidence of the interest in many types of enclosure design at the time.

Progress on loudspeaker enclosure design and analysis using acoustic analogous circuits by academic acousticians like Harry F. Olson continued in the 1940s. In 1952, Bart N. Locanthi developed equivalent electrical models of common loudspeaker configurations. In 1954 Leo L. Beranek of the Massachusetts Institute of Technology published Acoustics, a book summarizing and extending the electroacoustics of the era. J. F. Novak used novel simplifying assumptions in an analysis in a 1959 paper which led to a practical solution for the response of a given loudspeaker in sealed and vented boxes, and also established their applicability by empirical measurement. In 1961, leaning heavily on Novak's work, A. N. Thiele described a series of sealed and vented box "alignments" (i.e., enclosure designs based on electrical filter theory with well-characterized behavior, including frequency response, power handling, cone excursion, etc.) in a publication in an Australian journal. This paper remained relatively unknown outside Australia until it was re-published in the Journal of the Audio Engineering Society in 1971. Thiele's work neglected enclosure losses and, although the application of filter theory is still important, his alignment tables now have little real-world utility due to neglecting enclosure losses.

Many others continued to develop various aspects of loudspeaker enclosure design in the 1960s and early 1970s. From 1968 to 1972, J. E. Benson published three articles in an Australian journal that thoroughly analyzed sealed, vented and passive radiator designs, all using the same basic model, which included the effects of enclosure, leakage and port losses. Beginning in June 1972, Richard H. Small published a series of very influential articles on direct radiator loudspeaker system analysis, including closed-box, vented-box, and passive-radiator loudspeaker systems, in the Journal of the Audio Engineering Society, restating and extending Thiele's work. These articles were also originally published in Australia, where he had attended graduate school, and where his thesis supervisor was J. E. Benson. The work of Benson and Small overlapped considerably, but differed in that Benson performed his work using computer programs and Small used analog simulators. Small also analyzed the systems including enclosure losses. Richard H. Small and Garry Margolis, the latter of JBL, published an article in the Journal of the Audio Engineering Society (June 1981), which recast much of the work that had been published up till then into forms suited to the programmable calculators of the time.

== Fundamental parameters ==
These are the physical parameters of a loudspeaker driver, as measured at small signal levels, used in the equivalent electrical circuit models. Some of these values are neither easy nor convenient to measure in a finished loudspeaker driver, so when designing speakers using existing drive units (which is almost always the case), the more easily measured parameters listed under Small Signal Parameters are more practical:

- $S_{\rm d}$ – Equivalent piston area of the driver diaphragm, in square metres.
- $M_{\rm ms}$ – Mass of the driver diaphragm and voice-coil assembly, including acoustic load, in kilograms. The mass of the driver diaphragm and voice-coil assembly alone is known as $M_{\rm md}$.
- $C_{\rm ms}$ – Compliance of the driver's suspension, in metres per newton (the reciprocal of its 'stiffness').
- $R_{\rm ms}$ – The mechanical resistance of the driver's suspension (i.e., 'lossiness'), in N·s/m.
- $L_{\rm e}$ – Voice coil inductance, in henries (H) (typically measured at 1 kHz for woofers).
- $R_{\rm e}$ – DC resistance of the voice coil, in ohms.
- $Bl$ – The product of magnetic flux density in the voice-coil gap and the length of wire in the magnetic field, in tesla-metres (T·m).

== Small signal parameters ==
These values can be determined by measuring the input impedance of the driver, near the resonance frequency, at small input levels for which the mechanical behavior of the driver is effectively linear (i.e., proportional to its input). These values are more easily measured than the fundamental ones above. The small signal parameters are:

- $f_{\rm s}$ – Resonance frequency of driver

$$f_{\rm s} = \frac{1}{2 \pi\cdot\sqrt{C_{\rm ms}\cdot M_{\rm ms}}}$$

- $Q_{\rm es}$ – Driver $Q$ at $f_{\rm s}$ considering electrical resistance $R_{\rm e}$ only

$$Q_{\rm es} = \frac{2 \pi\cdot f_{\rm s}\cdot M_{\rm ms} \cdot R_{\rm e}}{(Bl)^2} = \frac{R_{\rm e}}{(Bl)^2} \sqrt{\frac{M_{\rm ms}}{C_{\rm ms}}}$$

- $Q_{\rm ms}$ – Driver $Q$ at $f_{\rm s}$ considering driver nonelectrical losses only

$$Q_{\rm ms} = \frac{2 \pi\cdot f_{\rm s}\cdot M_{\rm ms}}{R_{\rm ms}} = \frac{1}{R_{\rm ms}} \sqrt{\frac{M_{\rm ms}}{C_{\rm ms}}}$$

- $Q_{\rm ts}$ – Total driver $Q$ at $f_{\rm s}$ resulting from all driver resistances

$$Q_{\rm ts} = \frac{Q_{\rm ms} \cdot Q_{\rm es}}{Q_{\rm ms} + Q_{\rm es}}$$

- $V_{\rm as}$ – Volume of air having the same acoustic compliance as driver suspension

$$V_{\rm as} = \rho \cdot c^2 \cdot S_{\rm d}^2 \cdot C_{\rm ms}$$
where $\rho$ is the density of air (1.184 kg/m^{3} at 25 °C), and $c$ is the speed of sound (346.1 m/s at 25 °C). Using SI units, the result will be in cubic metres. To convert $V_{\rm as}$ to litres, multiply by 1000.

- $R_{\rm ms}$ – Mechanical resistance of driver suspension

$$R_{\rm ms} = \frac{\rho \cdot c^2 \cdot S_{\rm d}^2}{2 \pi \cdot f_{\rm s} \cdot Q_{\rm ms} \cdot V_{\rm as}}$$

- $C_{\rm ms}$ – Mechanical compliance of driver suspension

$$C_{\rm ms} = \frac{V_{\rm as}}{\rho \cdot c^2 \cdot S_{\rm d}^2}$$

== Large signal parameters ==
These parameters are useful for predicting the approximate output of a driver at high input levels, though they are harder, sometimes extremely hard or impossible, to accurately measure. In addition, power compression, thermal, and mechanical effects due to high signal levels (e.g., high electric current and voltage, extended mechanical motion, and so on) all change driver behavior, often increasing distortion of several kinds:

- $X_{\rm max}$ – Maximum linear peak (or sometimes peak-to-peak) excursion (in mm) of the cone. Note that, because of mechanical issues, the motion of a driver cone becomes non-linear with large excursions, especially those in excess of this parameter.
- $X_{\rm mech}$ – Maximum physical excursion of the driver before physical damage. With a sufficiently large electrical input, the excursion will cause damage to the voice coil or another moving part of the driver. In addition, arrangements for voice coil cooling (e.g., venting of the pole piece, or openings in the voice coil former above the coil itself, both allowing heat dissipation with air flow) will themselves change behaviors with large cone excursions.
- $P_{\rm e}$ – Thermal power handling capacity of the driver, in watts. This value is difficult to characterize and is often overestimated, by manufacturers and others. As the voice coil heats, it changes dimension to some extent, and changes electrical resistance to a considerable extent. The latter changes the electrical relationships between the voice coil and passive crossover components, changing the slope and crossover points designed into the speaker system.
- $V_{\rm d}$ – Peak displacement volume, calculated by $V_{\rm d}$ = $S_{\rm d}$·$X_{\rm max}$

== Other parameters ==
- $Z_{\rm max}$ – The impedance of the driver at $f_{\rm s}$, used when measuring $Q_{\rm es}$ and $Q_{\rm ms}$.

$$Z_{\rm max} = R_e\left(1+\frac{Q_{\rm ms}}{Q_{\rm es}}\right)$$

- $EBP$ – The efficiency bandwidth product, a rough indicator measure. A common rule of thumb indicates that for $EBP>100$, a driver is perhaps best used in a vented enclosure, while $EBP<50$ indicates a sealed enclosure. For $50<EBP<100$, either enclosure may be used effectively.

$$EBP = \frac{f_{\rm s}}{Q_{\rm es}}$$

- $Z_{\rm nom}$ – The nominal impedance of the loudspeaker, typically 4, 8 or 16 ohms.
- $\eta_0$ – The reference or "power available" efficiency of the driver, in percent.

$\eta_0 = \left(\frac{\rho \cdot B^2 \cdot l^2 \cdot S_{\rm d}^2}{2 \cdot \pi \cdot c \cdot M_{\rm ms}^2 \cdot R_{\rm e}}\right)\times100\%$
The expression $\rho/2\pi c$ can be replaced by the value 5.445×10^{−4} m^{2}·s/kg for dry air at 25 °C. For 25 °C air with 50% relative humidity the expression evaluates to 5.365×10^{−4} m^{2}·s/kg.
A version that is more easily calculated with typical published parameters is:
$$\eta_0 = \left(\frac{4 \cdot \pi^2 \cdot f_{\rm s}^3 \cdot V_{\rm as}}{c^3 \cdot Q_{\rm es}}\right)\times100\%$$
The expression $4\pi^2/c^3$ can be replaced by the value 9.523×10^{−7} s^{3}/m^{3} for dry air at 25 °C. For 25 °C air with 50% relative humidity the expression evaluates to 9.438×10^{−7} s^{3}/m^{3}.

- From the efficiency, we may calculate sensitivity, which is the sound pressure level a speaker produces for a given input:

A speaker with an efficiency of 100% (1.0) would output a watt for every watt of input. Considering the driver as a point source in an infinite baffle, at one metre this would be distributed over a hemisphere with area $2\pi$ m^{2} for an intensity of $1/(2\pi)$ = 0.159155 W/m^{2}. The auditory threshold is taken to be 10^{–12} W/m^{2} (which corresponds to a pressure level of 20×10^{−6} Pa). Therefore a speaker with 100% efficiency would produce an SPL equal to 10log(0.159155/10^{–12}), which is 112.02 dB.
The SPL at 1 metre for an input of 1 watt is then: dB_{(1 watt)} = 112.02 + 10·log($\eta_0$)
The SPL at 1 metre for an input of 2.83 volts is then: dB_{(2.83 V)} = dB_{(1 watt)} + 10·log(8/$R_e$) = 112.02 + 10·log($\eta_0$) + 10·log(8/$R_e$)

== Qualitative descriptions ==
Cross-section of a dynamic cone loudspeaker. Image not to scale.

$f_{\rm s}$
Resonance frequency of driver, measured in hertz (Hz). The frequency at which the combination of the energy stored in the moving mass and suspension compliance is maximum, and results in maximum cone velocity. A more compliant suspension or a larger moving mass will cause a lower resonance frequency, and vice versa. Usually it is less efficient to produce output at frequencies below $f_{\rm s}$, and input signals significantly below $f_{\rm s}$ can cause large excursions, mechanically endangering the driver. Woofers typically have an $f_{\rm s}$ in the range of 13–60 Hz. Midranges usually have an $f_{\rm s}$ in the range of 60–500 Hz and tweeters between 500 Hz and 4 kHz. A typical factory tolerance for the value of $f_{\rm s}$ is ±15%.

$Q_{\rm ts}$
A unitless measurement, characterizing the combined electric and mechanical damping of the driver. In electronics, $Q$ is the inverse of the damping ratio. The value of $Q_{\rm ts}$ is proportional to the energy stored, divided by the energy dissipated, and is defined at resonance ($f_{\rm s}$). Most drivers have $Q_{\rm ts}$ values between 0.2 and 0.5, but there are valid (if unusual) reasons to have a value outside this range.

$Q_{\rm ms}$
A unitless measurement, characterizing the mechanical damping of the driver, that is, the losses in the suspension (surround and spider). It varies roughly between 0.5 and 10, with a typical value around 3. High $Q_{\rm ms}$ indicates lower mechanical losses, and low $Q_{\rm ms}$ indicates higher losses. The main effect of $Q_{\rm ms}$ is on the impedance of the driver, with high $Q_{\rm ms}$ drivers displaying a higher impedance peak. One predictor for low $Q_{\rm ms}$ is a metallic voice-coil former. These act as eddy-current brakes and increase damping, reducing $Q_{\rm ms}$. They must be designed with an electrical break in the cylinder (so no conducting loop). Some speaker manufacturers have placed shorted turns at the top and bottom of the voice coil to prevent it leaving the gap, but the sharp noise created by this device when the driver is overdriven is alarming and was perceived as a problem by owners. High $Q_{\rm ms}$ drivers are often built with nonconductive formers made from paper or various plastics.

$Q_{\rm es}$
A unitless measurement, describing the electrical damping of the loudspeaker. As the coil of wire moves through the magnetic field, it generates a current which opposes the motion of the coil. This so-called "Back-EMF" (proportional to $Bl$ × velocity) decreases the total current through the coil near the resonance frequency, reducing cone movement and increasing impedance. In most drivers, $Q_{\rm es}$ is the dominant factor in the voice coil damping. $Q_{\rm es}$ depends on amplifier output impedance. The formula above assumes zero output impedance. When an amplifier with nonzero output impedance is used, its output impedance should be added to $R_{\rm e}$ for calculations involving $Q_{\rm es}$.

$Bl$
Measured in tesla-metres (T·m). Technically this is $B \times l$ or $B \times l sin(\theta)$ (a vector cross product), but the standard geometry of a circular coil in an annular voice-coil gap gives $sin(\theta)=1$. $B \times l$ is also known as the 'force factor' because the force on the coil imposed by the magnet is $B \times l$ multiplied by the current through the coil. The higher the $B \times l$ product, the larger the force that is generated by a given current flowing through the voice coil. $B \times l$ has a very strong effect on $Q_{\rm es}$.

$V_{\rm as}$
Measured in litres (L) or cubic metres, it is an inverse measure of the 'stiffness' of the suspension with the driver mounted in free air. It represents the volume of air that has the same stiffness as the driver's suspension when acted on by a piston of the same area ($S_{\rm d}$) as the cone. Larger values mean lower stiffness, and generally require larger enclosures. $V_{\rm as}$ varies with the square of the diameter. A typical factory measurement tolerance for $V_{\rm as}$ is ±20–30%.

$M_{\rm ms}$
Measured in grams (g) or kilograms (kg), this is the mass of the cone, coil, voice-coil former and other moving parts of a driver, including the acoustic load imposed by the air in contact with the driver cone. $M_{\rm md}$ is the cone/coil mass without the acoustic load, and the two should not be confused. Some simulation software calculates $M_{\rm ms}$ when $M_{\rm md}$ is entered. $M_{\rm md}$ can be very closely controlled by the manufacturer.

$R_{\rm ms}$
Units are not usually given for this parameter, but it is in mechanical 'ohms'. $R_{\rm ms}$ is a measurement of the losses, or damping, in a driver's suspension and moving system. It is the main factor in determining $Q_{\rm ms}$. $R_{\rm ms}$ is influenced by suspension topology, materials, and by the voice-coil former (bobbin) material.

$C_{\rm ms}$
Measured in metre per newton (m/N). Describes the compliance (i.e., the inverse of stiffness) of the suspension. The more compliant a suspension system is, the lower its stiffness, so the higher the $V_{\rm as}$ will be. $C_{\rm ms}$ is proportional to $V_{\rm as}$ and thus has the same tolerance ranges.

$R_{\rm e}$
Measured in ohms (Ω), this is the DC resistance (DCR) of the voice coil, best measured with the cone blocked, or prevented from moving or vibrating because otherwise the pickup of ambient sounds can cause the measurement to be unreliable. $R_{\rm e}$ should not be confused with the rated driver impedance, $R_{\rm e}$ can be tightly controlled by the manufacturer, while rated impedance values are often approximate at best. American EIA standard RS-299A specifies that $R_{\rm e}$ (or DCR) should be at least 80% of the rated driver impedance, so an 8-ohm rated driver should have a DC resistance of at least 6.4 ohms, and a 4-ohm unit should measure 3.2 ohms minimum. This standard is voluntary, and many 8-ohm drivers have resistances of ≈5.5 ohms, and proportionally lower for lower rated impedances.

$L_{\rm e}$
Measured in henries (H), this is the inductance of the voice coil. The voice coil is a lossy inductor, in part due to losses in the pole piece, so the apparent inductance changes with frequency. Large $L_{\rm e}$ values limit the high-frequency output of the driver and cause response changes near cutoff. Simple modeling software often neglects $L_{\rm e}$, and so does not include its consequences. Inductance varies with excursion because the voice coil moves relative to the pole piece, acting like a sliding inductor core, increasing inductance on the inward stroke and decreasing it on the outward stroke in typical overhung voice coil arrangements. This inductance modulation is an important source of nonlinearity (distortion) in loudspeakers. Including a copper cap on the pole piece, or a copper shorting ring on it, can reduce the increase in impedance seen at higher frequencies in typical drivers, and also reduce the nonlinearity due to inductance modulation.

$S_{\rm d}$
Measured in square metres (m^{2}). The effective projected area of the cone or diaphragm. It is difficult to measure and depends largely on the shape and properties of the surround. Generally accepted as the cone body diameter plus one third to one half the width of the annulus (surround). Drivers with wide roll surrounds can have significantly less $S_{\rm d}$ than conventional types with the same frame diameter.

$X_{\rm max}$
Specified in millimetres (mm). In the simplest form, subtract the height of the voice-coil winding from the height of the magnetic gap, take the absolute value and divide by 2. This technique was suggested by JBL's Mark Gander in a 1981 AES paper, as an indicator of a loudspeaker motor's linear range. Although easily determined, it neglects magnetic and mechanical non-linearities and asymmetry, which are substantial for some drivers. Subsequently, a combined mechanical/acoustical measure was suggested, in which a driver is progressively driven to high levels at low frequencies, with $X_{\rm max}$ determined by measuring excursion at a level where 10% THD is measured in the output. This method better represents actual driver performance, but is more difficult and time-consuming to determine.

$P_{\rm e}$
Specified in watts. Frequently two power ratings are given, an "RMS" rating and a "music" (or "peak", or "system") rating, usually peak is given as ≈2 times the RMS rating. Loudspeakers have complex behavior, and a single number is really unsatisfactory. There are two aspects of power handling: thermal and mechanical. The thermal capacity is related to coil temperature and the point where adhesives and coil insulation melt or change shape. The mechanical limit comes into play at low frequencies, where excursions are largest, and involves mechanical failure of some component. A speaker that can handle 200 watts thermally at 200 Hz, may sometimes be damaged by only a few watts at some very low frequency, like 10 Hz. Power handling specifications are usually generated destructively, by long-term industry standard noise signals (IEC 268, for example) that filter out low frequencies and test only the thermal capability of the driver. Actual mechanical power handling depends greatly on the enclosure in which the driver is installed.

$V_{\rm d}$
Specified in litres (L). The volume displaced by the cone, equal to the cone area ($S_{\rm d}$) multiplied by $X_{\rm max}$. A particular value may be achieved in any of several ways. For instance, by having a small cone with a large $X_{\rm max}$, or a large cone with a small $X_{\rm max}$. Comparing $V_{\rm d}$ values will give an indication of the maximum output of a driver at low frequencies. High $X_{\rm max}$, small cone diameter drivers are likely to be inefficient, since much of the voice-coil winding will be outside the magnetic gap at any one time and will therefore contribute little or nothing to cone motion. Likewise, large cone diameter, small $X_{\rm max}$ drivers are likely to be more efficient as they will not need, and so may not have, long voice coils.

$\eta_0$
Reference efficiency, specified in percent (%). Comparing drivers by their calculated reference efficiency is often more useful than using 'sensitivity' since manufacturer sensitivity figures are too often optimistic.

Sensitivity
The sound pressure, in dB, produced by a speaker in response to a specified stimulus. Usually this is specified at an input of 1 watt or 2.83 volts (2.83 volts = 1 watt into an 8-ohm load) at a distance of one metre.

== Measurement notes—large signal behavior ==
Some caution is required when using and interpreting T/S parameters. Individual units may not match manufacturer specifications. Parameters values are almost never individually taken, but are at best averages across a production run, due to inevitable manufacturing variations. Driver characteristics will generally lie within a (sometimes specified) tolerance range. $C_{\rm ms}$ is the least controllable parameter, but typical variations in $C_{\rm ms}$ do not have large effects on the final response.

It is also important to understand that most T/S parameters are linearized small signal values. An analysis based on them is an idealized view of driver behavior, since the actual values of these parameters vary in all drivers according to drive level, voice coil temperature, over the life of the driver, etc. $C_{\rm ms}$ decreases the farther the coil moves from rest. $Bl$ is generally maximum at rest, and drops as the voice coil approaches $X_{\rm max}$. $R_{\rm e}$ increases as the coil heats and the value will typically double by 270 °C (exactly 266 °C for Cu and 254 °C for Al), at which point many voice coils are approaching (or have already reached) thermal failure.

As an example, $f_{\rm s}$ and $V_{\rm as}$ may vary considerably with input level, due to nonlinear changes in $C_{\rm ms}$. A typical 110-mm diameter full-range driver with an $f_{\rm s}$ of 95 Hz at 0.5 V signal level, might drop to 64 Hz when fed a 5 V input. A driver with a measured $V_{\rm as}$ of 7 L at 0.5 V, may show a $V_{\rm as}$ increase to 13 L when tested at 4 V. $Q_{\rm ms}$ is typically stable within a few percent, regardless of drive level. $Q_{\rm es}$ and $Q_{\rm ts}$ decrease <13% as the drive level rises from 0.5 V to 4 V, due to the changes in $Bl$. Because $V_{\rm as}$ can rise significantly and $f_{\rm s}$ can drop considerably, with a trivial change in measured $M_{\rm ms}$, the calculated sensitivity value ($\eta_0$) can appear to drop by >30% as the level changes from 0.5 V to 4 V. Of course, the driver's actual sensitivity has not changed at all, but the calculated sensitivity is correct only under some specific conditions. From this example, it is seen that the measurements to be preferred while designing an enclosure or system are those likely to represent typical operating conditions. Unfortunately, this level must be arbitrary, since the operating conditions are continually changing when reproducing music. Level-dependent nonlinearities typically cause lower than predicted output, or small variations in frequency response.

Level shifts caused by resistive heating of the voice coil are termed power compression. Design techniques which reduce nonlinearities may also reduce power compression, and possibly distortions not caused by power compression. There have been several commercial designs that have included cooling arrangements for driver magnetic structures, which are intended to mitigate voice coil temperature rise, and the attendant rise in resistance that is the cause of the power compression. Elegant magnet and coil designs have been used to linearize $Bl$ and reduce the value and modulation of $L_{\rm e}$. Large, linear spiders can increase the linear range of $C_{\rm ms}$, but the large signal values of $Bl$ and $C_{\rm ms}$ must be balanced to avoid dynamic offset.

== Lifetime changes in driver behavior ==
The mechanical components in typical speaker drivers may change over time. Paper, a popular material in cone fabrication, absorbs moisture easily and unless treated may lose some structural rigidity over time. This may be reduced by coating with water-impregnable material such as various plastic resins. Cracks compromise structural rigidity and if large enough are generally non-repairable. Temperature has a strong, generally reversible effect; typical suspension materials become stiffer at lower temperatures. The suspension experiences fatigue, and also undergoes changes from chemical and environmental effects associated with aging such as exposure to ultraviolet light, and oxidation which affect foam and natural rubber components badly, though butyl, nitrile, SBR rubber, and rubber-plastic alloys (such as Santoprene) are more stable. The polyester type of polyurethane foam is highly prone to disintegration after 10 to 15 years. The changes in behavior from aging may often be positive, though since the environment that they are used in is a major factor the effects are not easily predicted. Gilbert Briggs, founder of Wharfedale Loudspeakers in the UK, undertook several studies of aging effects in speaker drivers in the 1950s and 1960s, publishing some of the data in his books, notably Loudspeakers: The Why and How of Good Reproduction.

There are also mechanical changes which occur in the moving components during use. In this case, however, most of the changes seem to occur early in the life of the driver, and are almost certainly due to relaxation in flexing mechanical parts of the driver (e.g., surround, spider, etc.). Several studies have been published documenting substantial changes in the T/S parameters over the first few hours of use, some parameters changing by as much as 15% or more over these initial periods. The proprietor of the firm GR Research has publicly reported several such investigations of several manufacturers' drivers. Other studies suggest little change, or reversible changes after only the first few minutes. This variability is largely related to the particular characteristics of specific materials, and reputable manufacturers attempt to take them into account. While there are a great many anecdotal reports of the audible effects of such changes in published speaker reviews, the relationship of such early changes to subjective sound quality reports is not completely clear. Some changes early in driver life are complementary (such as a reduction in $f_{\rm s}$ accompanied by a rise in $V_{\rm as}$) and result in minimal net changes (small fractions of a dB) in frequency response. If the performance of speaker system is critical, as with high order (complex) or heavily equalized systems, it is sensible to measure T/S parameters after a period of run-in (some hours, typically, using program material), and to model the effects of normal parameter changes on driver performance.

== Measurement techniques ==
There are numerous methods to measure Thiele-Small parameters, but the simplest use the input impedance of the driver, measured near resonance. The impedance may be measured in free air (with the driver unhoused and either clamped to a fixture or hanging from a wire, or sometimes resting on the magnet on a surface) and/or in test baffles, sealed or vented boxes or with varying amounts of mass added to the diaphragm. Noise in the measurement environment can have an effect on the measurement, so one should measure parameters in a quiet acoustic environment.

The most common (DIY-friendly) method before the advent of computer-controlled measurement techniques is the classic free air constant current method, described by Thiele in 1961. This method uses a large resistance (e.g., $R_{\rm test}$ = 500 to 1000 ohms) in series with the driver and a signal generator is used to vary the excitation frequency. The voltage across the loudspeaker terminals is measured and considered proportional to the impedance. It is assumed that variations in loudspeaker impedance will have little effect on the current through the loudspeaker. This is an approximation, and the method results in $Q$ measurement errors for drivers with a high $Z_{\rm max}$ – the measured value of $Z_{\rm max}$ will always be somewhat low. This measurement can be corrected by measuring the total voltage across the calibration resistor and the driver (call this $V$) at resonance and calculating the actual test current $I = V/(R_{\rm test} + Z_{\rm max})$. You may then obtain a corrected $Z_{\rm max}$ = $Z_{\rm max(uncorrected)}\times R_{\rm test}/I$.

A second method is the constant voltage measurement, where the driver is excited by a constant voltage, and the current passing through the coil is measured. The excitation voltage divided by the measured current equals the impedance.

A common source of error using these first two methods is the use of inexpensive AC voltage meters. Most inexpensive meters are designed to measure residential power frequencies (50–60 Hz) and are increasingly inaccurate at other frequencies (e.g., below 40 Hz or above a few hundred hertz). In addition, distorted or non–sine wave signals can cause measurement inaccuracies. Inexpensive voltmeters are also not very accurate or precise at measuring current and can introduce appreciable series resistance, which causes measurement errors.

A third method is a response to the deficiencies of the first two methods. It uses a smaller (e.g., 10 ohm) series resistor and measurements are made of the voltage across the driver, the signal generator, and/or series resistor for frequencies around resonance. Although tedious, and not often used in manual measurements, simple calculations exist which allow the true impedance magnitude and phase to be determined. This is the method used by many computer loudspeaker measurement systems. When this method is used manually, the result of taking the three measurements is that their ratios are more important than their actual value, removing the effect of poor meter frequency response.

== See also ==
- Electrical characteristics of a dynamic loudspeaker
- Acoustical engineering
