= Bryce Bayer =

American industrial physicist and inventor (1929–2012)

- Born: Bryce Edward Bayer; August 15, 1929; Portland, Maine, U.S.
- Died: November 13, 2012 (aged 83); Bath, Maine, U.S.
- Citizenship: United States
- Education: University of Maine (B.S., Engineering Physics); University of Rochester (M.S., Industrial Statistics)
- Known for: Bayer filter
- Scientific career
- Workplaces: Kodak

Bryce Edward Bayer (/ˈbaɪər/; pronounced BYE-er, August 15, 1929 – November 13, 2012) was an American scientist who invented the Bayer filter pattern, which is used in most modern color digital cameras. He has been called "the maestro without whom photography as we know wouldn't have been the same."

== Early life and education ==
Bryce Edward Bayer was born in Portland, Maine, on August 15, 1929, to Alton and Marguerite Willard Bayer. As a boy he tinkered with Brownies and other cameras. He graduated in 1947 from Deering High School in Portland, where he spent a good deal of time in the school darkroom. "He, in fact, processed all of the pictures for his high school yearbook," his son David told The New York Times following Bayer's death.

After receiving a bachelor's degree in engineering physics from the University of Maine in 1951, Bayer moved to Rochester, New York, to work as a research scientist at Eastman Kodak, where he would remain until his retirement in 1986. At Kodak he met Joan Fitzgerald, a fellow researcher; they were married in 1954. Bayer pursued further studies at the University of Rochester, from which he earned a master's degree in industrial statistics in 1960.

== Bayer filter ==
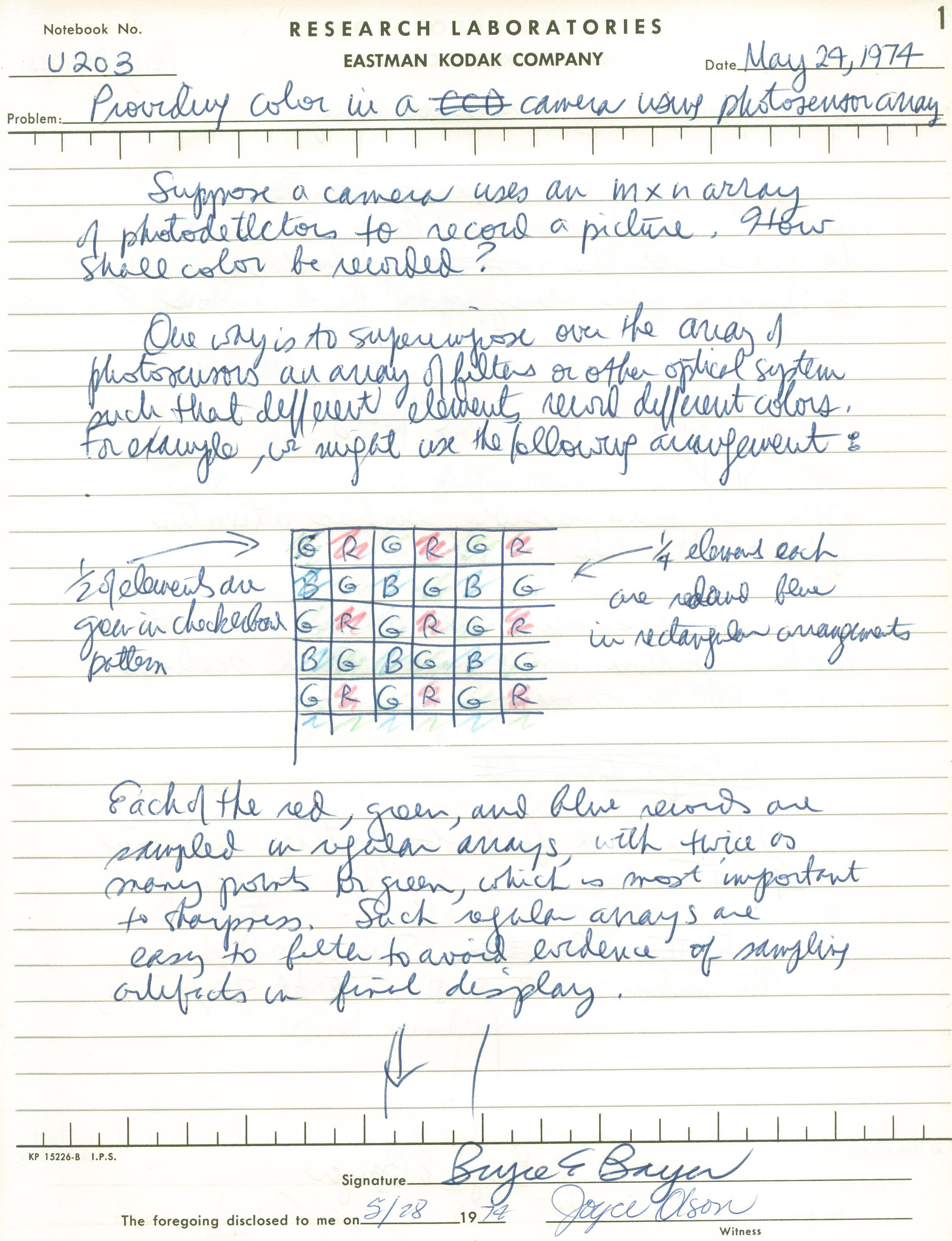
Kodak Lab notebook entry showing Bayer Pattern

In 1974, while working for Kodak Research Labs (KRL), Bayer was asked by his colleague Peter Dillon to consider the best color pattern to use for an integral color image sensor being developed by Dillon. Bayer documented his ideas in his KRL lab notebook on May 24, 1974, as shown in the figure. His entry includes a color sketch of his now famous "Bayer pattern" and states that "each of the red, green and blue records are sampled in regular arrays, with twice as many points for green, which is most important to sharpness”. In March 1975, Kodak filed a patent application, titled "Color imaging array", with Bayer as the sole inventor. The patent, which issued as U.S. patent 3,971,065 in July 1976, describes color patterns having luminance (e.g. green) elements arranged in a checkerboard pattern, which provides uniform luminance sampling in both the horizontal and vertical directions.

The Bayer color filter array pattern was first used in the Kodak DCS 200 camera, which was introduced in 1992. It is used today in almost all color cameras, including those in smartphones, computers, camcorders, and drones. In the Bayer pattern, half of the pixels collect green light, and the others are evenly divided between red and blue light. The resulting Nyquist domains for the green sampling maintains the same Nyquist frequency for horizontal and vertical spatial frequencies as a sensor having all green-sensitive elements.

Bayer color filter array pattern

"The pattern is very simple," Ken Parulski, former chief scientist for Kodak's digital camera division, told The New York Times after Bayer's death. "There are twice as many green elements as red or blue because this mimics the way the human eye provides the sharpest overall color image." Parulski added that although dozens of other patterns have since been devised, including some by Parulski himself, "the Bayer pattern has stood the test of time." Larry Scarff, a former chairman of the Camera Phone Image Quality Standards Group, told the Times that "Ninety-nine point nine-nine percent of all digital cameras — cellphones, pocket cameras, webcams and consumer digital video cameras — use the Bayer pattern to produce color pictures." Dr. Terry Taber, Kodak Vice President and Chief Technology Officer has said that the "elegant colour technology invented by Bryce Bayer is behind nearly every digital image captured today."

According to the Rochester Democrat and Chronicle, Bayer's work on the filter "helped pave the way for the development of the first working digital camera a year later." Steve Sasson, co-inventor of the first digital camera, told the Rochester newspaper "that Bayer's contributions were not only pioneering but prophetic." Sasson added that "Bryce has always been a hero for me." Parulski told the Democrat and Chronicle that he felt "very lucky to have worked with Bryce, starting on my very first day at Kodak....Bryce was so modest and unassuming, it took me years to realize what a genius he really was." Parulski added "that Bayer's invention is the key reason we have cameras that are compact yet provide sharp-looking pictures."

== Other professional activities ==
Bayer's contribution to photography also included algorithms that play a crucial role in storing, enhancing, and printing digital images. As a leading scientist in the Information Technology Laboratory within the Physics Division of the Kodak Research Laboratories (KRL), Bryce demonstrated, in the early eighties, that computers could greatly enhance image quality. For example, he showed a large print of a dock scene made from a very small Disc camera negative. The image looked like it had been made from a much larger 35 mm negative. One could see the braids in the rope sitting on the dock.

About fifteen years earlier, in the mid-sixties, he developed a way to encrypt information in a way that the code could not be broken by others. Again, he developed this as a leader within the KRL Information Technology Laboratory. At the time, he was also studying Shannon's work on information theory and entropy, Shannon-Fano coding to use shorter codes for more frequent words or signals, etc. Bryce led a group in the areas of computer programming, applied statistics, information science, and applied mathematics. The group developed an automated way to selectively disseminate information to users based on their interest profiles and on their interest level feedback. This process is like processes used today by Google and Amazon.

In the mid-1960s, there was a group of similar size to Bryce's group working down the hall from Bryce's group. They were working on psycho-physics related to user assessment of digital image quality, color perception, etc. The Bayer filter enables a digital imaging system to do what the eye does. The extra green sensors provide more luminance information, as the rods in the eye do, when it is dark. When the digital imaging system and the eye encounter situations with low levels of illumination, both systems can provide and use more luminance information and less chrominance information.

== Honors and awards ==
Bayer was awarded the Royal Photographic Society's Progress Medal in 2009 given "in recognition of any invention, research, publication or other contribution which has resulted in an important advance in the scientific or technological development of photography or imaging in the widest sense." In 2012, Bayer received the first Camera Origination and Imaging Medal from the Society of Motion Picture and Television Engineers.

== Personal life and death ==
Bayer and his wife had two sons, Douglas and David, and a daughter, Janet. Bayer died on November 13, 2012, in Bath, Maine, of "a long illness related to dementia," his son Douglas told The New York Times.
