= RGBE filter =

Alternative color filter array

Isometric projection of the RGBE filter on a pixel array (e.g. CCD)

In digital photography, the RGBE filter is an alternative color filter array to the Bayer filter (GRGB). It similarly uses a mosaic of pixel filters, of red, green, blue and "emerald" ("like cyan" according to Sony), and so also requires demosaicing to produce a full-color image. It was developed by Sony and so far is used only in the ICX456 8-megapixel CCD and in the Sony Cyber-shot DSC-F828 camera.

Sony states that the reason for adding the fourth filter color is "to reduce the color reproduction errors and to record natural images closer to the natural sight perception of the human eye".

The RGBE array uses a fourth color, cyan, as well as red, green and blue

Compare with the earlier Bayer filter, with twice the number of pure green cells (while cyan colored light is a mix of green and blue, so sensors for that color also detects green and blue colors)

== See also ==
- Color filter array
- Bayer filter
- CYGM filter
- Foveon X3 sensor
