= Neville Thiele =

Australian audio engineer (1920–2012)

Albert Neville Thiele OAM
- Born: 4 December 1920; Brisbane, Queensland, Australia
- Died: 1 October 2012 (aged 91); Australia
- Education: Brisbane Grammar School, University of Queensland, University of Sydney
- Occupation: Audio engineer
- Years active: 1940s–2000s
- Known for: Thiele/Small parameters
- Awards: Norman W. V. Hayes Medal (1970, 1992); Fellow of the Audio Engineering Society (1979); Silver Medal – Audio Engineering Society (1994); IEEE Masaru Ibuka Consumer Electronics Award (2003); Order of Australia (OAM) (2003); Honorary Doctor of Science in Architecture (2008); Peter Barnett Memorial Award – Institute of Acoustics (2009)

Albert Neville Thiele, OAM (4 December 1920 – 1 October 2012), was an Australian audio engineer. Thiele was born in Brisbane, Australia. He was particularly noted for his work on electronic filters and on developing the Thiele/Small parameters for characterising loudspeakers as an aid to loudspeaker cabinet design.

== Early life and education ==
Thiele was educated at Milton State School, Brisbane Grammar School and the Universities of Queensland and Sydney. After performing on Brisbane radio stations as a boy soprano in the early 1930s, and later as an actor, he became interested in the reproduction and transmission of sound. After five years of war service in infantry and the Australian Electrical and Mechanical Engineers (AEME, subsequently Royal Australian Electrical and Mechanical Engineers) in New Guinea and Bougainville, he graduated with a Bachelor of Engineering (Mechanical and Electrical) in 1952.

== Degrees and awards ==
- 1952 Bachelor of Engineering
- 1970 Norman W. V. Hayes Medal
- 1979 Audio Engineering Society fellow.
- 1992 Norman W. V. Hayes Medal
- 1994 awarded the Silver Medal of the Audio Engineering Society ‘for pioneering work in loudspeaker simulation’.
- 2003 co-recipient, with Richard H. Small, of the IEEE Masaru Ibuka Consumer Electronics Award ‘for major contributions to the synthesis and analysis of loudspeakers’.
- 2003 awarded the Order of Australia (OAM) in the 2003 Queen's Birthday honours ‘for service to audio engineering, particularly in the field of loudspeaker design and the development of audio engineering standards’.
- 2008 Doctor of Science in Architecture (honoris causa)
- 2009 awarded the Peter Barnett Memorial Award by the Institute of Acoustics (U.K.) ‘for technical excellence, practical advancement and education in the fields of electroacoustics and speech intelligibility’.

== Publications ==
- Thiele, A. Neville (1956). "The Design of Filters Using Only RC Sections and Gain Stages," Electronic Engineering, 28(335 & 336), pp. 31–36 & 80–82.
- Thiele, A. Neville (1958). "Television IF Amplifiers with Linear Phase Response," Proceedings of the Institute of Radio Engineers, Australia, 19(11), pp. 652–668.
- Thiele, A. Neville (1959). "Recovery of Amplifiers After Overload," Proceedings of the Institute of Radio Engineers, Australia, 20(5), pp. 257–261.
- Thiele, A. Neville (1960). "Techniques of Delay Equalisation," Proceedings of the Institute of Radio Engineers, Australia, 21(4), pp. 225–241.
- Thiele, A. Neville (1961). "A Hybrid Network for Mixing and Splitting Signals," Proceedings of the Institute of Radio Engineers, Australia, 22(6), pp. 383–387.
- Thiele, A. Neville (1961). "Loudspeakers in Vented Boxes," Proceedings of the Institute of Radio Engineers, Australia, 22(8), pp. 487–508. Reprinted in Journal of the Audio Engineering Society, 1971, 19(5 & 6), pp. 382–392 & 471–483. Reprinted in R.E. Cooke (ed.) Loudspeakers, An Anthology, Vol. 1 - Vol. 25 (1953-1977), Audio Engineering Society, New York, 1978, pp. 181–204. Reprinted in Vented Loudspeakers - An Anthology, Institute of Radio and Electronics Engineers. Reprinted in German as "Lautsprecher in ventilierten Gehäusen (Die Berechtnungsunterlagen für Baßreflexgehäuse)," Hifiboxen Selbstgemacht, Elrad extra 8, Verlag Heinz Heise GmbH & Co. KG, Hannover, 1989, pp. 91 – 112.
- Thiele, A. Neville (1962). "Equalisation of Gramophone Pickups," Proceedings of the Institute of Radio Engineers, Australia, 23(5), pp. 311–313.
- Thiele, A. Neville (1962). "Miller Resistance," Proceedings of the Institute of Radio Engineers, Australia, 23(6), pp. 359–360.
- Thiele, A. Neville (1965). "Measurement of Return Loss at Video Frequencies," Proceedings of the Institute of Radio and Electronics Engineers, 26(6), pp. 183–191.
- Thiele, A. Neville (1965). "The Theory of Null Traps," Proceedings of the Institute of Radio and Electronics Engineers, 26(7), pp. 224–231.
- Thiele, A. Neville (1965). "Filters with Variable Cut-Off Frequencies," Proceedings of the Institute of Radio and Electronics Engineers, 26(9), pp. 284–301.
- Thiele, A. Neville (1966). "Methods of Waveform (Pulse and Bar) Testing," Proceedings of the Institute of Radio and Electronics Engineers, 27(12), pp. 339–362.
- Thiele, A. Neville (1967). "A Simple Shunt Regulator," Proceedings of the Institute of Radio and Electronics Engineers, 28(5), pp. 175–178.
- Thiele, A. Neville (1967). "Variable Equalisers for Short Video Cables," Proceedings of the Institute of Radio and Electronics Engineers, 28(7), pp. 215–231.
- Thiele, A. Neville and McKilligan, R.S. (1968). "Elimination of Brightness Variation in Television Monitors Appearing "On-Camera"," Proceedings of the Institute of Radio and Electronics Engineers, 29(2), pp. 53-54.
- Thiele, A. Neville (1969). "Horizontal Aperture Equalisation," Proceedings of the Institute of Radio and Electronics Engineers, 30(11), pp. 348–363. Reprinted Radio and Electronic Engineer, 1970.
- Thiele, A. Neville (1970). "Complementary Emitter Follower for Feeding Matched Loads," Proceedings of the Institute of Radio and Electronics Engineers, 31(10), pp. 354–355.
- Thiele, A. Neville (1973). "Loudspeakers, Enclosures and Equalisers," Proceedings of the Institute of Radio and Electronics Engineers, 34(11), pp. 425–448. Reprinted in Vented Loudspeakers - An Anthology, Institute of Radio and Electronics Engineers.
- Thiele, A. Neville (1974). "Inter-Order Response Characteristics for Simplified Active Filters," Proceedings of the Institute of Radio and Electronics Engineers, 35(3), pp. 57–60.
- Thiele, A. Neville (1975). "Optimum Passive Loudspeaker Dividing Networks," Proceedings of the Institute of Radio and Electronics Engineers, 36(7), pp. 220–224.
- Thiele, A. Neville (1975). "Load Stabilising Networks for Audio Amplifiers," Proceedings of the Institute of Radio and Electronics Engineers, 36(9), pp. 297–300. Reprinted Journal of the Audio Engineering Society, 1976, 24(1), pp. 20–23.
- Thiele, A. Neville (1975). "Air-Cored Inductors for Audio," Proceedings of the Institute of Radio and Electronics Engineers Australia, 36(10), pp. 329–333. Reprinted Journal of the Audio Engineering Society, 1976, 24(5), pp. 374–378. Postscript Journal of the Audio Engineering Society, 1976, 24(10), pp. 830–832.
- Thiele, A. Neville (1979). "The Importance of Standards in Broadcasting," The Radio and Electronic Engineer, 49(9), pp. 443–447.
- Thiele, A. Neville (1983). "Measurement of Non-Linear Distortion in a Band-Limited System," Journal of the Audio Engineering Society, 31(6), pp. 443–445.
- Thiele, A. Neville (1985). "Three-Level Tone Test Signal for Setting Audio Levels," Journal of the Audio Engineering Society, 33(12), pp. 963–967; and letter Journal of the Audio Engineering Society, 1986, 34(12), pp. 997–998.
- Thiele, A. Neville (1989). "The Decibel in Sound Program Transmission," Journal of Electrical and Electronics Engineering, Australia, 9(1/2), pp. 1–10.
- Thiele, A. Neville (1989). "An Improved Pre-Emphasis Standard for AM Broadcasting," Journal of the Audio Engineering Society, 37(11), pp. 934–939. Reprinted Journal of Electrical and Electronics Engineering, Australia, 1990, 10(1), pp. 12–19.
- Thiele, A. Neville (1989). "Measurement of the Thiele-Small Parameters of Tweeters," Journal of Electrical and Electronics Engineering, Australia, 9(4), pp. 186–199.
- Thiele, A. Neville (1992). "An Improved Law of Contrast Gradient for High Definition Television," Journal of Electrical and Electronics Engineering, Australia, 12(4), pp. 394–402. Reprinted Journal of the Society of Motion Picture and Television Engineers, 1992, 103(1), pp. 18–25.
- Thiele, A. Neville (1993). "Force Conversion Factors of a Loudspeaker Driver," Journal of Electrical and Electronics Engineering, Australia, 13(2), pp. 129–131. Reprinted Journal of the Audio Engineering Society, 1993, 41(9), pp. 701–703.
- Thiele, A. Neville and Burton, John (1993). "Standards in Digital Video," Journal of Electrical and Electronics Engineering, Australia, 13(3), pp. 133–139.
- Thiele, A. Neville (1993). "Research and Development in Digital Video and Multimedia in Australia," Journal of Electrical and Electronics Engineering, Australia, 13(3), pp. 140–152.
- Thiele, A. Neville (1993). "Digital Audio for Digital Video," Journal of Electrical and Electronics Engineering, Australia, 13(3), pp. 246–256.
- Thiele, A. Neville (1997). "Precise Passive Crossovers incorporating Loudspeaker Driver Parameters," Journal of the Audio Engineering Society, 45(7/8), pp. 585–594.
- Thiele, A. Neville (2000). "Loudspeaker Crossovers with Notched Responses," Journal of the Audio Engineering Society, 48(9), pp. 786–799.
- Thiele, A. Neville (2000). "An Air-Cored Autotransformer with Nearly Equal Decibel Taps," Journal of the Audio Engineering Society, 48(12), pp. 1194–1215.
- Thiele, A. Neville (2002). "Estimating Loudspeaker Response when the Vent Output is Delayed," Journal of the Audio Engineering Society, 50(3), pp. 173–175.
- Thiele, A. Neville (2002). "A Passive Crossover System of Order 3(Low-Pass) + 5(High-Pass) Incorporating Driver Parameters," Journal of the Audio Engineering Society, 50(12), pp. 1030–1038.
- Thiele, A. Neville (2007). "Implementing Asymmetrical Crossovers," Journal of the Audio Engineering Society, 55(10), pp. 819–832.
- Thiele, A. Neville (2010). "Closed Box Loudspeaker with a Series Capacitor," Journal of the Audio Engineering Society, 58(7/8), pp. 577–582.
- Thiele, A. Neville (2015). Posthumous. "Power Limitations in High Quality Sound Reproduction," AES Melbourne Section website. http://www.aesmelbourne.org.au/2015/02/28/neville-thiele-paper-annct/
