= Bruce R. Davis =

Australian electrical engineer

- Born: 17 July 1939 (age 87); Adelaide, Australia
- Education: University of Adelaide
- Awards: Norman W. V. Hayes Medal (1989)
- Scientific career
- Fields: Electronic engineer
- Workplaces: University of Adelaide; Bell Laboratories
- Doctoral advisor: Eric O. Willoughby
- Doctoral students: Derek Abbott; William Cowley

Bruce Raymond Davis (born 17 July 1939, Adelaide) is an Australian electronic engineer, notable for his research in mobile communication systems, satellite communications, and high frequency data communication systems.

== Education ==
He attended Adelaide Technical High School, Adelaide, Australia. He received a B.E. (Hons.) degree in electronic engineering, 1960, a B.Sc. in mathematics, 1963, and the PhD degree in electronic engineering, 1969, all from the University of Adelaide, Australia.

== Career ==
He was first employed by University of Adelaide in 1964. During 1970, he was with Bell Laboratories, Holmdel, New Jersey, studying various aspects of mobile radio communications and again in 1977, when he was involved in satellite systems research. In 1988, he developed SUGAR—a circuit analysis simulation tool named in allusion to University of California Berkeley's software called SPICE. In 1992, he was a visiting scholar with the Communications Division of the Defence Science and Technology Organisation (DSTO), Salisbury, South Australia, and was involved with high-frequency data communication systems.

== Honours ==
He was a co-recipient of the 1986 IEE Overseas Premium Best Paper Award and winner of the 1989 IREE Norman W. V. Hayes Medal.

== Selected publications ==
- B. R. Davis, "An improved importance sampling method for digital-communication system simulations," IEEE Transactions on Communications, Vol. 34, No. 7, pp. 715–719, 1986.
- K. T. Ko and B. R. Davis, "Delay analysis for a TDMA channel with contiguous output and Poisson message arrival," IEEE Transactions on Communications, Vol. 32, No. 6, pp. 707–709, 1984.
- B. R. Davis and R. E. Bogner, "Propagation at 500 MHz for mobile radio," IEE Proceedings-F Radar and Signal Processing, Vol. 132, No. 5, pp. 307–320, 1985.
- J. B. Scholz and B. R. Davis, "Error-probability estimator structures based on analysis of the receiver decision variable," IEEE Transactions on Communications, Vol. 43, No. 8, pp. 2311–2315, 1995.
- B. R. Davis and W. G. Cowley, "Bias and variance of spectral estimates from an all-pole digital-filter," IEEE Transactions on Acoustics, Speech, and Signal Processing, Vol. 30, No. 2, pp. 322–329, 1982.
- A. G. Bolton and B. R. Davis, "Evaluation of coefficient sensitivities for 2nd-order digital resonators," IEE Proceedings-G Circuits Devices and Systems, Vol. 128, No. 3, pp. 127–130, 1981.
- B. R. Davis, D. Abbott, and J. M. R. Parrondo, "Thermodynamic energy exchange in a moving plate capacitor," Chaos, Vol. 11, No. 3, pp. 747–754, 2001.
