= CYYM filter =

Color filter array

A CYYM array, with 4 sub-arrays, each with one cyan, one magenta.

A CYYM filter is a color filter array. It consists of one cyan, two yellow, and one magenta element. Developed by Kodak, it was used in the Kodak DCS 620x and DCS 720x DSLRs.
