= Richard H. Small =

American scientist (born 1935)

Richard H. Small (born 1935) is an American scientist, who has worked mainly in the field of electroacoustics. He is known for the commonly used Thiele/Small parameters for loudspeaker enclosure design, which are named after Small and his colleague Neville Thiele.

== Early life ==
Small was born in San Diego, California. His father was an amateur pianist. Having a keen interest in electronics he built the amplifiers to drive the speakers in his parents house. His father built various enclosures for the loudspeakers, following the trends of the times. He earned a Bachelor of Science degree from the California Institute of Technology in 1956 and a Master of Science degree in electrical engineering from the Massachusetts Institute of Technology in 1958.

== Career ==
He gained experience in electronic circuit design for high-performance analytical instruments at the Bell & Howell Research Center in California from 1958 to 1964. During this period, he took a one-year visiting fellowship at the Norwegian Technical University.

After a working visit to Japan in 1964, he moved to Australia, where he got a part-time job at the University of Sydney as a teaching assistant in the electronics lab. He became interested in loudspeaker analysis and measurement and met A. N. Thiele who was lecturing at the university. He was awarded a Ph.D. degree in 1972. Upon completion of his Ph.D., he published a series of nine papers—now considered classics—on the low-frequency analysis of closed-box, vented and passive radiator loudspeaker systems.

He taught for a number of years at that university, but returned to industry in 1986 as Head of Research at KEF Electronics Ltd. in Maidstone, England until 1993. He then joined Harman International based in their Martinsville, Indiana, USA facility.
