= Color filter array =

Pattern of color filters over an image sensor

The Bayer color filter mosaic. Each two-by-two submosaic contains 2 green, 1 blue, and 1 red filter, each filter covering one pixel sensor.

In digital imaging, a color filter array (CFA), or color filter mosaic (CFM), is a mosaic of tiny color filters placed over the pixel sensors of an image sensor to capture color information.

The term is also used in reference to e paper devices where it means a mosaic of tiny color filters placed over the grey scale display panel to reproduce color images.

== Image sensor overview ==
Color filters are needed because the typical photosensors detect light intensity with little or no wavelength specificity and therefore cannot separate color information. Since sensors are made of semiconductors, they obey solid-state physics.

The color filters filter the light by wavelength range, such that the separate filtered intensities include information about the color of light. For example, the Bayer filter (shown by the image) gives information about the intensity of light in red, green, and blue (RGB) wavelength regions. The raw image data captured by the image sensor is then converted to a full-color image (with intensities of all three primary colors represented at each pixel) by a demosaicing algorithm which is tailored for each type of color filter. The spectral transmittance of the CFA elements along with the demosaicing algorithm jointly determine the color rendition. The sensor's passband quantum efficiency and span of the CFA's spectral responses are typically wider than the visible spectrum, thus all visible colors can be distinguished. The responses of the filters do not generally correspond to the CIE color matching functions, so a color translation is required to convert the tristimulus values into a common, absolute color space.

The Foveon X3 sensor uses a different structure such that a pixel utilizes properties of multi-junctions to stack blue, green, and red sensors on top of each other. This arrangement does not require a demosaicing algorithm because each pixel has information about each color. Dick Merrill of Foveon distinguishes the approaches as "vertical color filter" for the Foveon X3 versus "lateral color filter" for the CFA.

== List of color filter arrays ==
Image	Name	Description	Pattern size (pixels)
Bayer pattern	Bayer filter	Very common RGB filter. With one blue, one red, and two green.	2×2
RGBE pattern	RGBE filter	Bayer-like with one of the green filters modified to "emerald"; used in a few Sony cameras.	2×2
RYYB pattern	RYYB filter	One red, two yellow, and one blue;	2×2
CYYM pattern	CYYM filter	One cyan, two yellow, and one magenta; used in a few cameras of Kodak.	2×2
CYGM pattern	CYGM filter	One cyan, one yellow, one green, and one magenta; used in a few cameras.	2×2
RGBW pattern	RGBW Bayer	Traditional RGBW similar to Bayer and RGBE patterns.	2×2
RGBW pattern	RGBW #1	Three example RGBW filters from Kodak, with 50% white. (See Bayer filter#Modifications)	4×4
RGBW pattern	RGBW #2	Three example RGBW filters from Kodak, with 50% white. (See Bayer filter#Modifications)	4×4
RGBW pattern	RGBW #3	Three example RGBW filters from Kodak, with 50% white. (See Bayer filter#Modifications)	2×4
SuperCCD	Super CCD	Fujifilm-specific RGB matrix filter	2×2 (rotated 45°)
SuperCCD EXR	Super CCD EXR	Fujifilm-specific RGB matrix filter	2×2 (rotated 45°)
X Trans pattern	X-Trans	Fujifilm-specific RGB matrix filter, with a large pattern, studied for diminishing Moiré effect.	6×6
Quad Bayer	Quad Bayer	Similar to Bayer filter, however with 4x blue, 4x red, and 8x green. Used by Sony, also known as Tetracell by Samsung and 4-cell by OmniVision.	4×4
Quad Bayer RYYB	RYYB Quad Bayer	Similar to Quad Bayer filter, but with RYYB instead of RGGB. i.e. 4x blue, 4x red, and 8x yellow. First used in the Leica camera sensor of the Huawei P30 series smartphones.	4×4
Nonacell Bayer	Nonacell	Similar to Bayer filter, however with 9x blue, 9x red, and 18x green.	6×6
	RCCC	Used in the automotive industry. A monochrome sensor is desired for maximum sensitivity, with the red channel required for regions of interest such as traffic lights and rear lights.	2x2
	RCCB	Used in the automotive industry. Similar to the Bayer sensor except the green pixels are clear, providing more low-light sensitivity and less noise.	2x2

=== RGBW sensor ===
An RGBW matrix (from red, green, blue, white) is a CFA that includes "white" or transparent filter elements that allow the photodiode to respond to all colors of light; that is, some cells are "panchromatic", and more of the light is detected, rather than absorbed, compared to the Bayer matrix. Sugiyama filed for a patent on such an arrangement in 2005. Kodak announced several RGBW CFA patents in 2007, all of which have the property that when the panchromatic cells are ignored, the remaining color filtered cells are arranged such that their data can be processed with a standard Bayer demosaicing algorithm.

=== CYGM sensor ===
A CYGM matrix (cyan, yellow, green, magenta) is a CFA that uses mostly secondary colors, again to allow more of the incident light to be detected rather than absorbed. Other variants include CMY and CMYW matrices.

== Manufacture of the image sensor CFA ==
Diazonaphthoquinone (DNQ)-novolac photoresist is one material used as the carrier for making color filters from color dyes or pigments. There is some interference between the dyes and the ultraviolet light needed to properly expose the polymer, though solutions have been found for this problem. Color photoresists sometimes used include those with chemical monikers CMCR101R, CMCR101G, CMCR101B, CMCR106R, CMCR106G, and CMCR106B.

A few sources discuss other specific chemical substances, attending optical properties, and optimal manufacturing processes of color filter arrays.

For instance, Nakamura said that materials for on-chip color filter arrays fall into two categories: pigment and dye. Pigment based CFAs have become the dominant option because they offer higher heat resistance and light resistance compared to dye based CFAs. In either case, thicknesses ranging up to 1 micrometre are readily available.

Theuwissen says "Previously, the color filter was fabricated on a separate glass plate and glued to the CCD (Ishikawa 81), but nowadays, all single-chip color cameras are provided with an imager which has the color filter on-chip processed (Dillon 78) and not as a hybrid." He provides a bibliography focusing on the number, types, aliasing effects, moire patterns, and spatial frequencies of the absorptive filters.

Some sources indicate that the CFA can be manufactured separately and affixed after the sensor has been manufactured, while other sensors have the CFA manufactured directly on the surface of the imager. Theuwissen makes no mention of the materials utilized in CFA manufacture.

At least one early example of an on-chip design utilized gelatin filters (Aoki et al., 1982). The gelatin is sectionalized, via photolithography, and subsequently dyed. Aoki reveals that a CYWG arrangement was used, with the G filter being an overlap of the Y and C filters.

Filter materials are manufacturer specific. Adams et al. state "Several factors influence the CFA's design. First, the individual CFA filters are usually layers of transmissive (absorptive) organic or pigment dyes. Ensuring that the dyes have the right mechanical properties—such as ease of application, durability, and resistance to humidity and other atmospheric stresses—is a challenging task. This makes it difficult, at best, to fine-tune the spectral responsivities.".

Given that the CFAs are deposited on the image sensor surface at the BEOL (back end of line, the later stages of the integrated circuit manufacturing line), where a low-temperature regime must be rigidly observed (due to the low melting temperature of the aluminum metalized "wires" and the substrate mobility of the dopants implanted within the bulk silicon), organics would be preferred over glass. On the other hand, some CVD silicon oxide processes are low temperature processes.

Ocean Optics has indicated that their patented dichroic filter CFA process (alternating thin films of ZnS and Cryolite) can be applied to spectroscopic CCDs. Gersteltec sells photoresists that possesses color filter properties.

=== Some pigment and dye molecules used in CFAs ===
In US Patent # 4,808,501, Carl Chiulli cites the use of 5 chemicals, three of which are C.I. #12715, AKA Solvent Red 8; Solvent Yellow 88; and C.I. # 61551, Solvent Blue 36.

In US Patent # 5,096,801, Koya et al., of Fuji Photo Film company, list some 150-200 chemical structures, mainly azo dyes and pyrazolone-diazenyl, but did not provide specific chemical names, CAS Registry numbers, or Colour Index numbers.

=== Optically efficient CFA implementation ===
Nakamura provides a schematic and bibliographic items illustrating the importance of microlenses, their f-number, and the interplay with the CFA and CCD array. Further, a short discussion of anti-reflection films is offered, though Janesick's work appears is more concerned with photon–silicon interaction. Early work on microlenses and on the three-CCD/prism cameras stress the importance of a fully integrated design solution for CFAs. The camera system, as a whole, benefits from careful consideration of CFA technologies and their interplay with other sensor properties.

== E-paper CFA ==
There are three primary methods for reproducing color on e paper displays. One uses micro spheres in various pigments, such as the limited color range three pigment Spectra displays or more faithful four pigment Advanced Color ePaper, both by E Ink. This method suffers from often slow refresh rates as with several pigments the display must perform refreshes for each pigment. As with grey scale units, after the display is updated the device does not require power to keep the image on screen.

The second common method uses a typical grey scale e paper display behind a transparent CFA. When displaying grey scale images the device runs at its native resolution, for instance, 300 pixels per inch (PPI). However, due to the CFA, the resolution of the device drops when displaying color images, say to 100 PPI. When the image to be displayed consists of both a colored and a black and white section, for example when a book page comprises plain text as well as a color photo, some e book devices may display the photo at the reduced resolution while the text is at the normal resolution.

The third method, as in ClearInk, uses a CFA consisting of a front layer of wells with hemispherical bottoms above a layer of fluid containing black charged spheres. When the spheres are away from the hemispheres, the hemispheres reflect brightly due to total internal reflection. When the black spheres are moved near to the hemispheres, the amount of reflection drops. The refresh rate on video versions of these devices is fast enough for video playback (33 Hz on the device, compared to 25 Hz for PAL television or 29.97 Hz for NTSC television). They require more energy to operate than a plain E Ink display but much less than a LCD based display.
