= Fujifilm X-T100 =

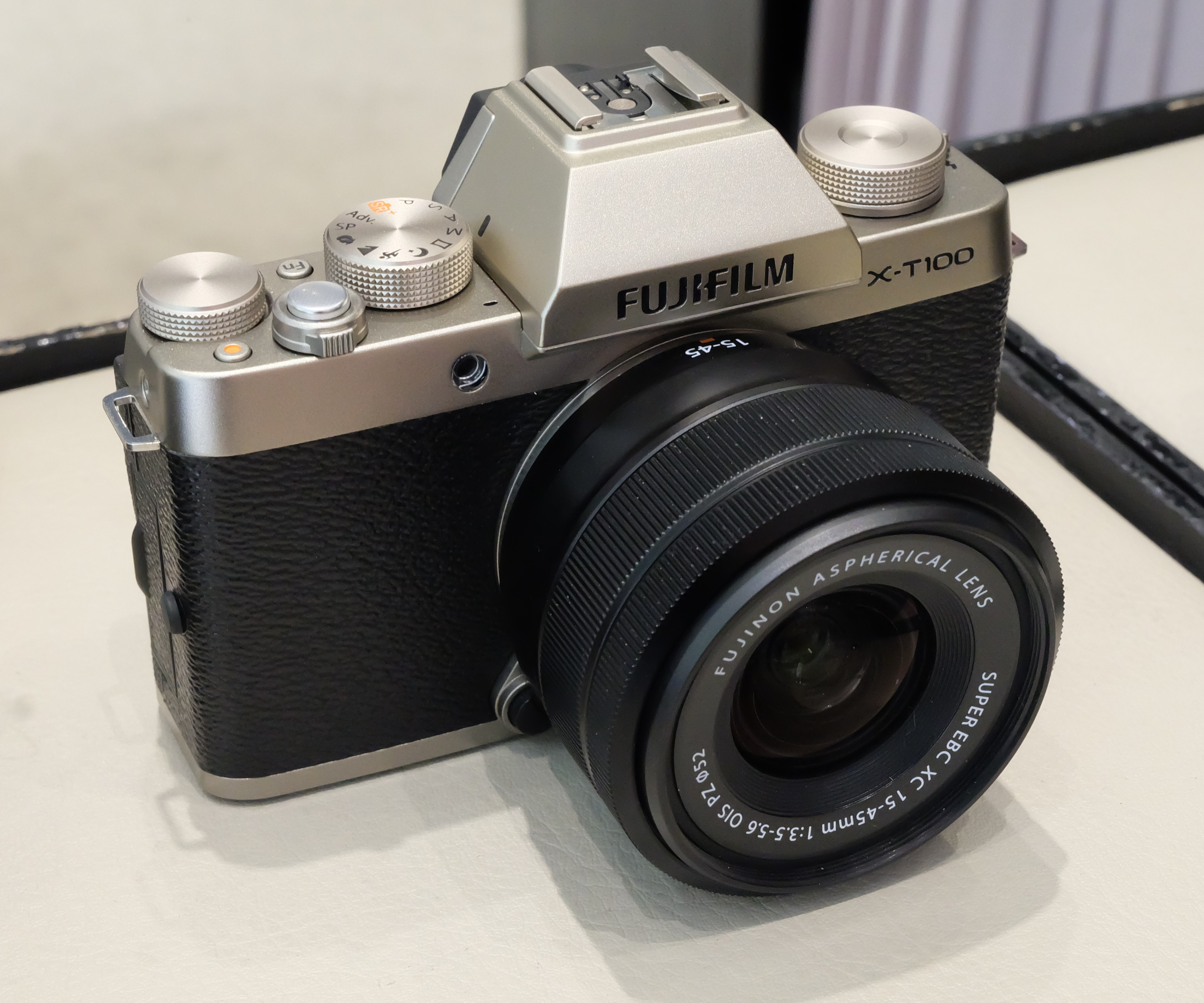
- X-T100 Gold Champagne + XC15mm-45mm F3.5-5.6 OIS PZ

Overview
- Maker: Fujifilm
- Type: MILC
- Released: June 21, 2018; 8 years ago
- Intro price: USD 699 (body), USD 799 (kit)

Lens
- Lens mount: Fujifilm X
- Lens: Interchangeable lens
- Compatible lenses: Fujinon

Sensor/medium
- Sensor: APS-C
- Sensor type: CMOS with Bayer filter
- Sensor size: 23.5mm x 15.7mm
- Sensor maker: Sony
- Maximum resolution: 24.2 megapixels 6000 x 4000
- Film speed: 200–12800 (standard); 100–51200 (extend)
- Storage media: SD, SDHC, SDXC (UHS-I)

Focusing
- Focus: Intelligent Hybrid TTL contrast detection / Phase detection
- Focus modes: Single AF, Continuous AF, MF, AF+MF
- Focus areas: 91 focus point

Exposure/metering
- Exposure: TTL 256-zone metering
- Exposure modes: Program AE, Aperture Priority AE, Shutter Speed Priority AE, Manual Exposure
- Exposure metering: Through-the-lens
- Metering modes: Multi, Spot, Average

Flash
- Flash: Manual pop-up flash
- Flash synchronization: 1/180 s
- Compatible flashes: Shoe Mount flash

Shutter
- Shutter: Focal Plane Shutter
- Shutter speeds: 30 s to 1/4000 s (mechanical), 4 s to 1/32000 s (electronic)
- Continuous shooting: 6.0 fps

Viewfinder
- Viewfinder: EVF with eye sensor
- Viewfinder magnification: 0.62
- Frame coverage: 100%

Image processing
- White balance: Automatic Scene recognition, Custom, Color temperature selection, Daylight, Shade, Fluorescent, Incandescent, Underwater
- WB bracketing: ±1, ±2, ±3
- Dynamic range bracketing: 100% · 200% · 400%

General
- Video recording: 4K up to 15 fps, 1080p up to 60 fps
- LCD screen: 3.0" 1.04M dots touchscreen variable-angle monitor
- Battery: NP-W126S Li-ion
- AV port(s): HDMI D, ⌀2.5 mm audio jack
- Data port: USB 2.0, Wi-Fi 4, Bluetooth 4.1
- Body features: Anodized aluminum body, Ultra Sonic Vibration Sensor Cleaning
- Dimensions: 121 mm × 83 mm × 47.4 mm (4.76 in × 3.27 in × 1.87 in)
- Weight: 448 g (16 oz) (0.988 lb) including battery and memory card
- Made in: Indonesia

Chronology
- Successor: Fujifilm X-T200

The Fujifilm X-T100 is a mid-range mirrorless interchangeable-lens camera announced on May 24, 2018. The X-T100 is largely based on the Fujifilm X-A5 and is nearly identical to the X-T20. It uses the Fujifilm X-mount.

The X-T100 is capable of recording video in 4K resolution with only 15 fps. The X-T100 is intended to be sold new either as the camera body only, or with the 15-45mm f/3.5-5.6 OIS PZ lens. The camera is available in 4 colors, black, dark silver, silver and champagne gold and is styled after an SLR camera.

The X-T200 succeeds the X-T100. The new camera was announced on January 27, 2020.

== Key features ==
- 24.2 Megapixels
- 23.5 mm x 15.7 mm CMOS sensor (APS-C). Bayer filter array with no anti-aliasing filter. The same sensor as used in the Fujifilm X-A5, not a Fujifilm X-Trans sensor.
- Touch screen with 3-way tilt
- Selectable film simulations
- Hybrid autofocus
- Face detection
- Eye detection
- 4K video
- 4K Burst, 4K Multi Focus
- Wi-Fi connectivity
- Bluetooth connectivity
- Detachable grip

== Features ==
The X-T100 is a mirrorless compact camera with an anodized coated aluminum top cover measuring 121 mm x 83 mm x 47.4 mm and weighing 448 g including memory card and battery. Fujifilm state that 430 photographs can be taken with one battery. It includes a detachable grip for improved handling.

There are 3 dials available in addition to the mode dial. The left dial has no labels on it and its function can be defined by the user. Similarly the right dial has no label and its function changes according to the mode selected.

The X-T100 is equipped with a Bayer type color filter array with no anti-aliasing filter.

The camera has Wi-Fi connectivity complemented by Bluetooth for connection and tagging via a smartphone. It comes in three different colors, Dark Silver, Black and Champagne Gold.

== Included accessories ==
- Li-ion battery NP-W126S
- AC power adapter
- Plug adapter
- USB cable
- Shoulder strap
- Body cap
- Owner's manual
- Detachable grip

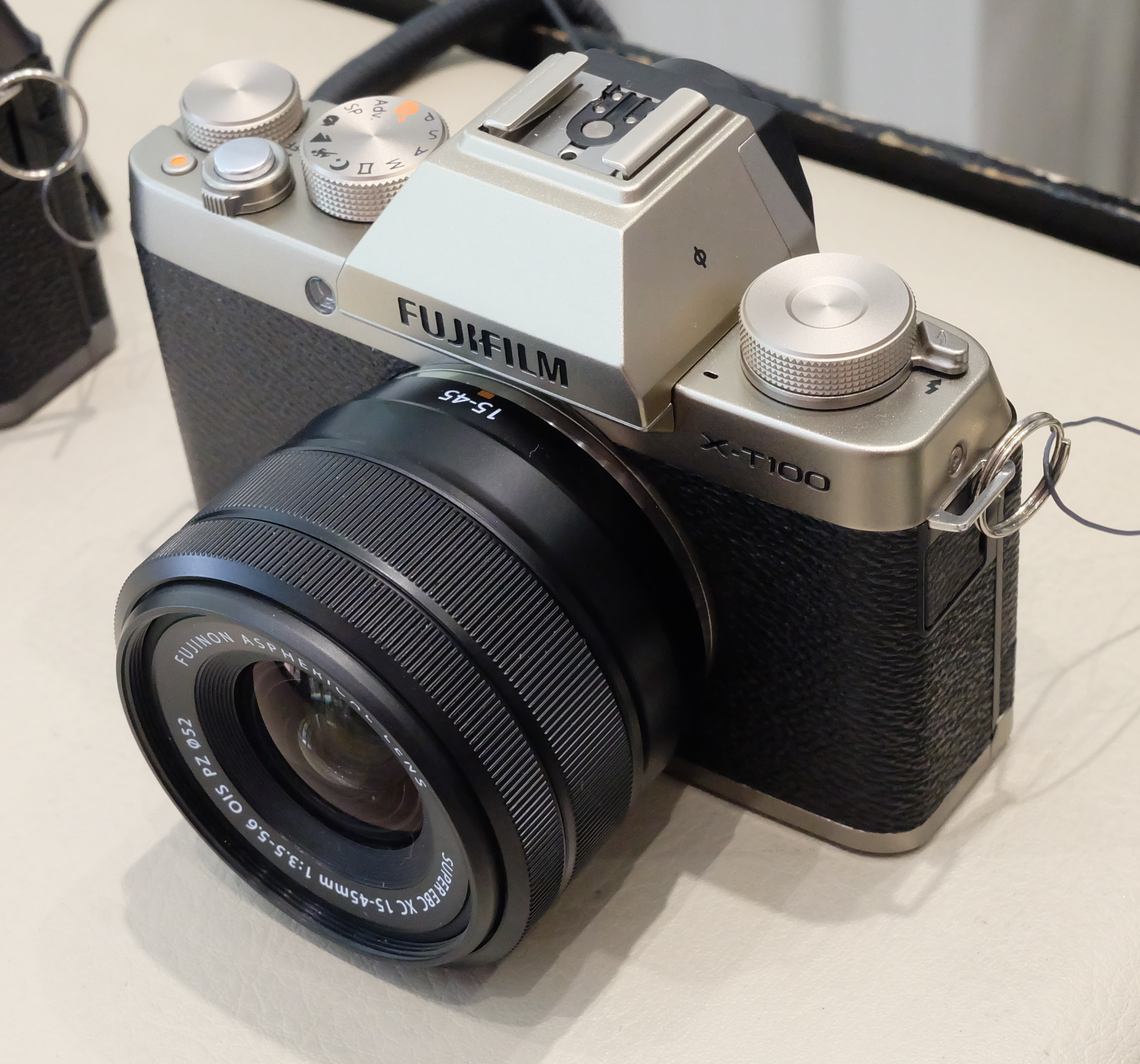

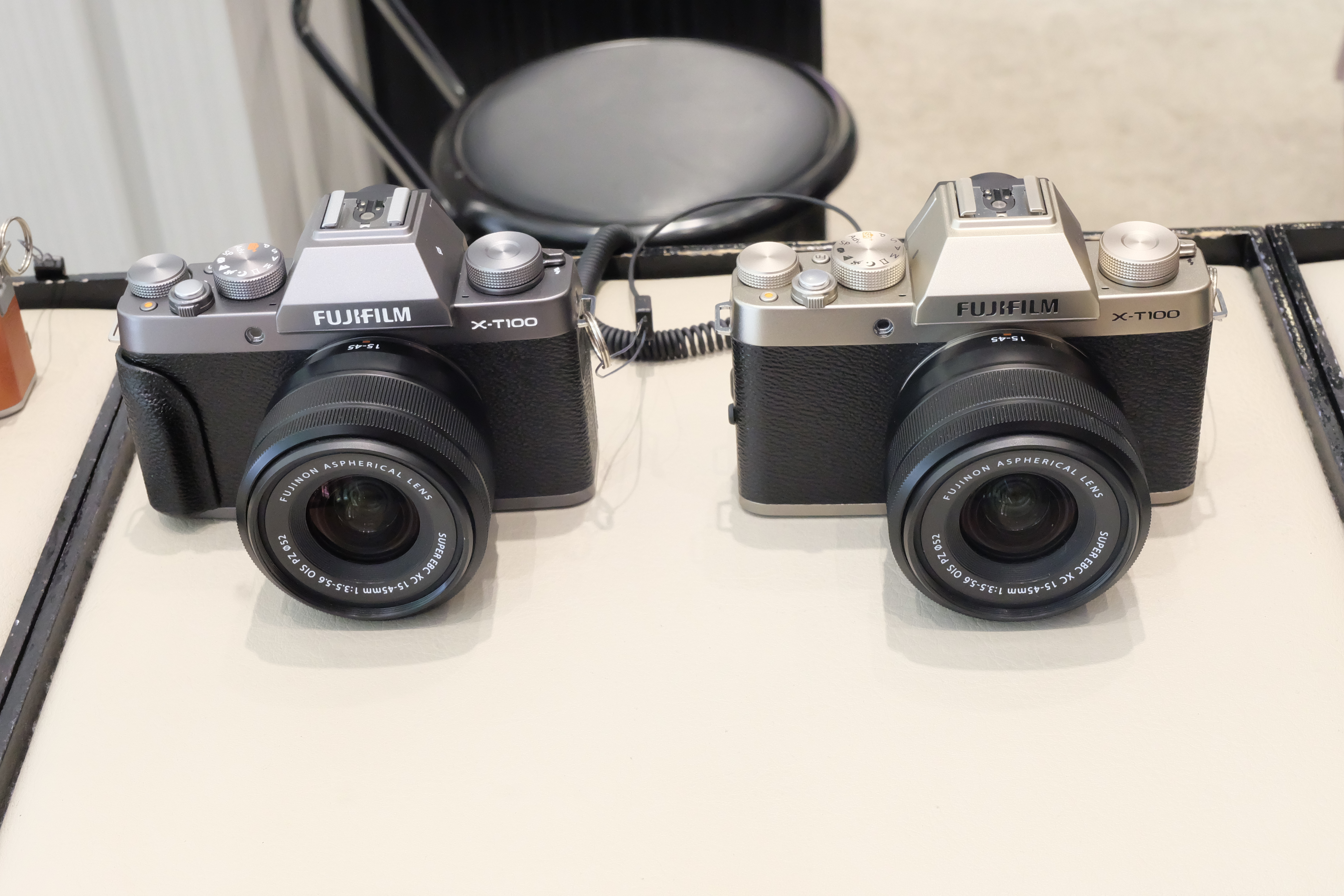

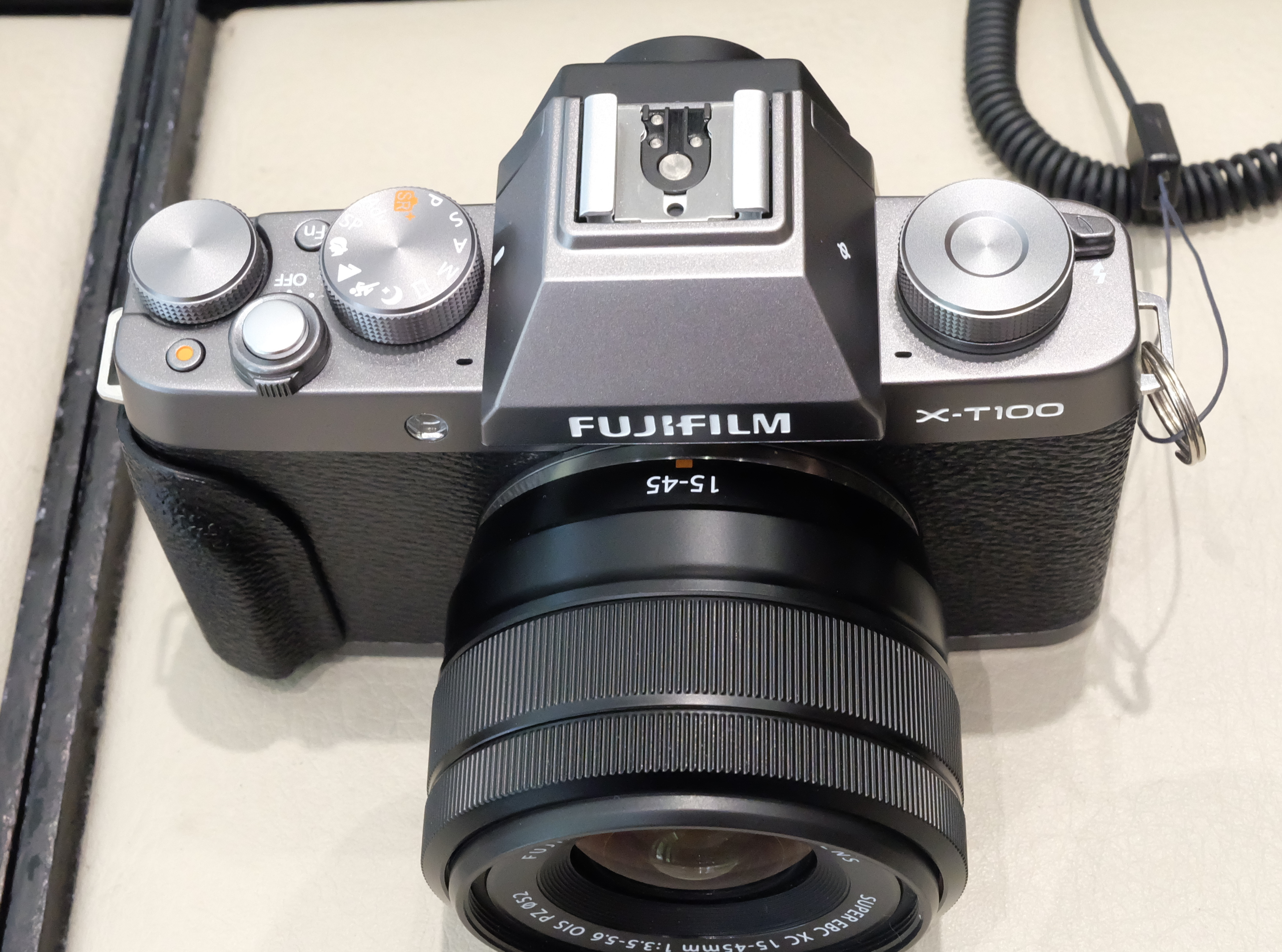

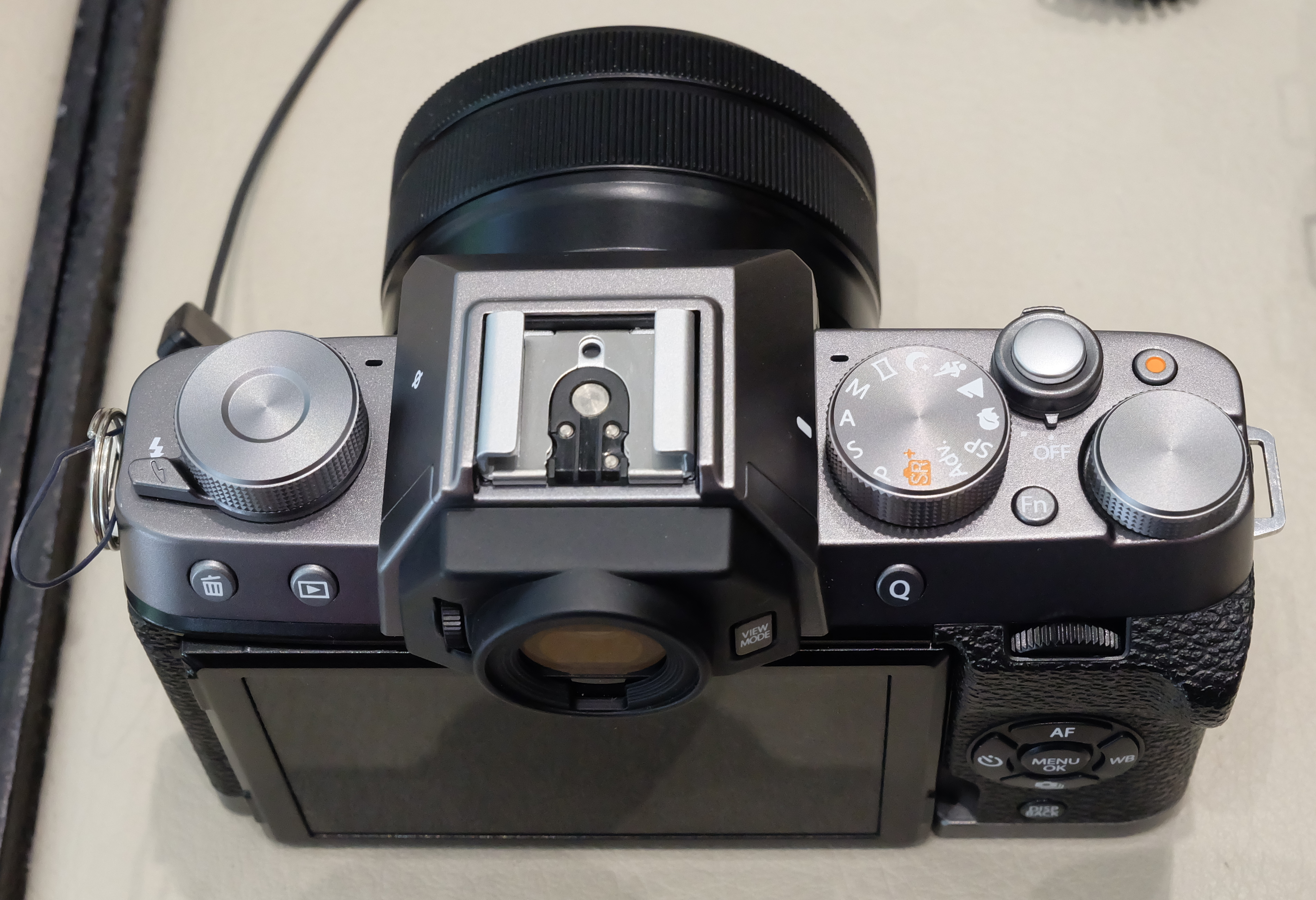

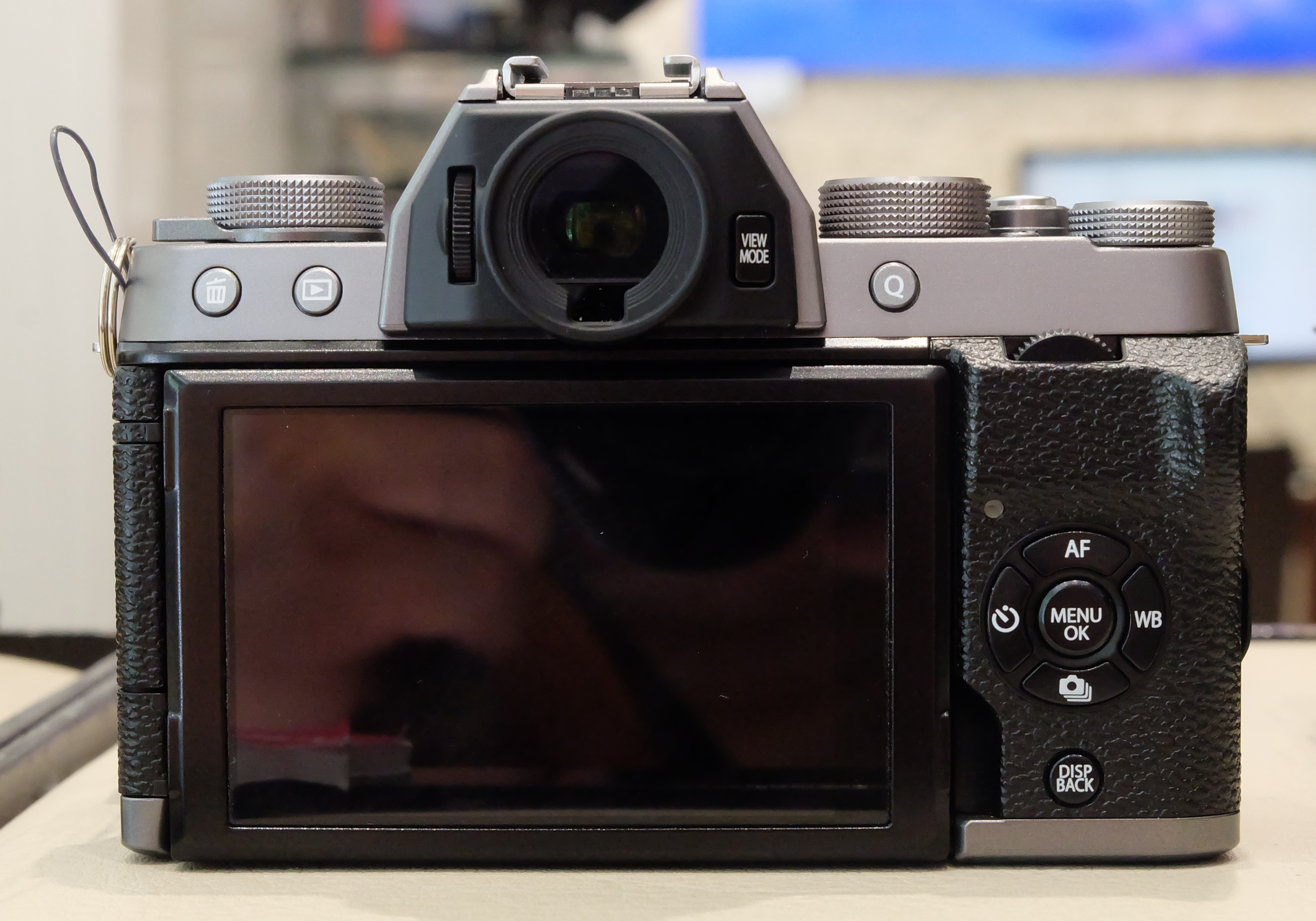

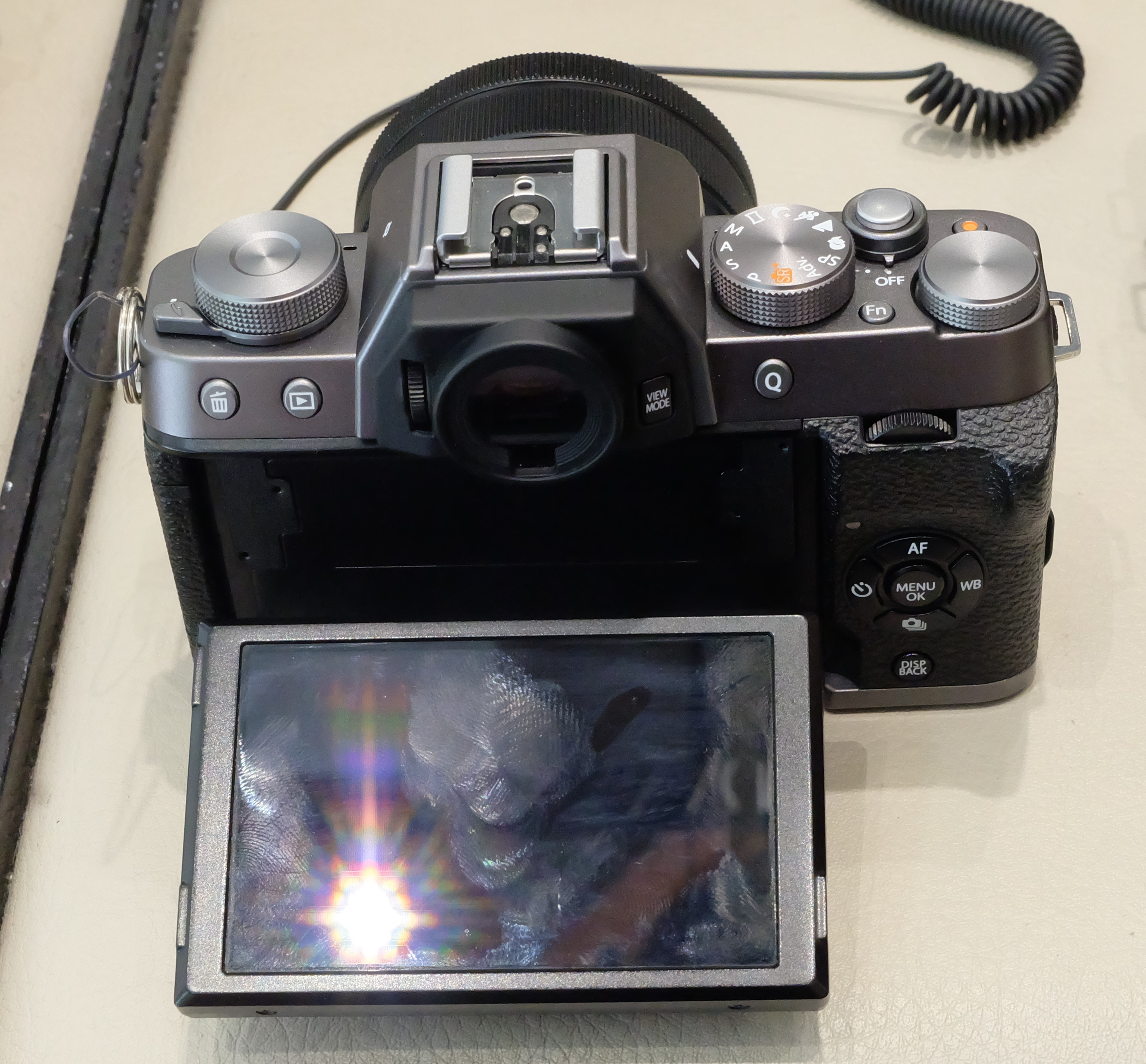

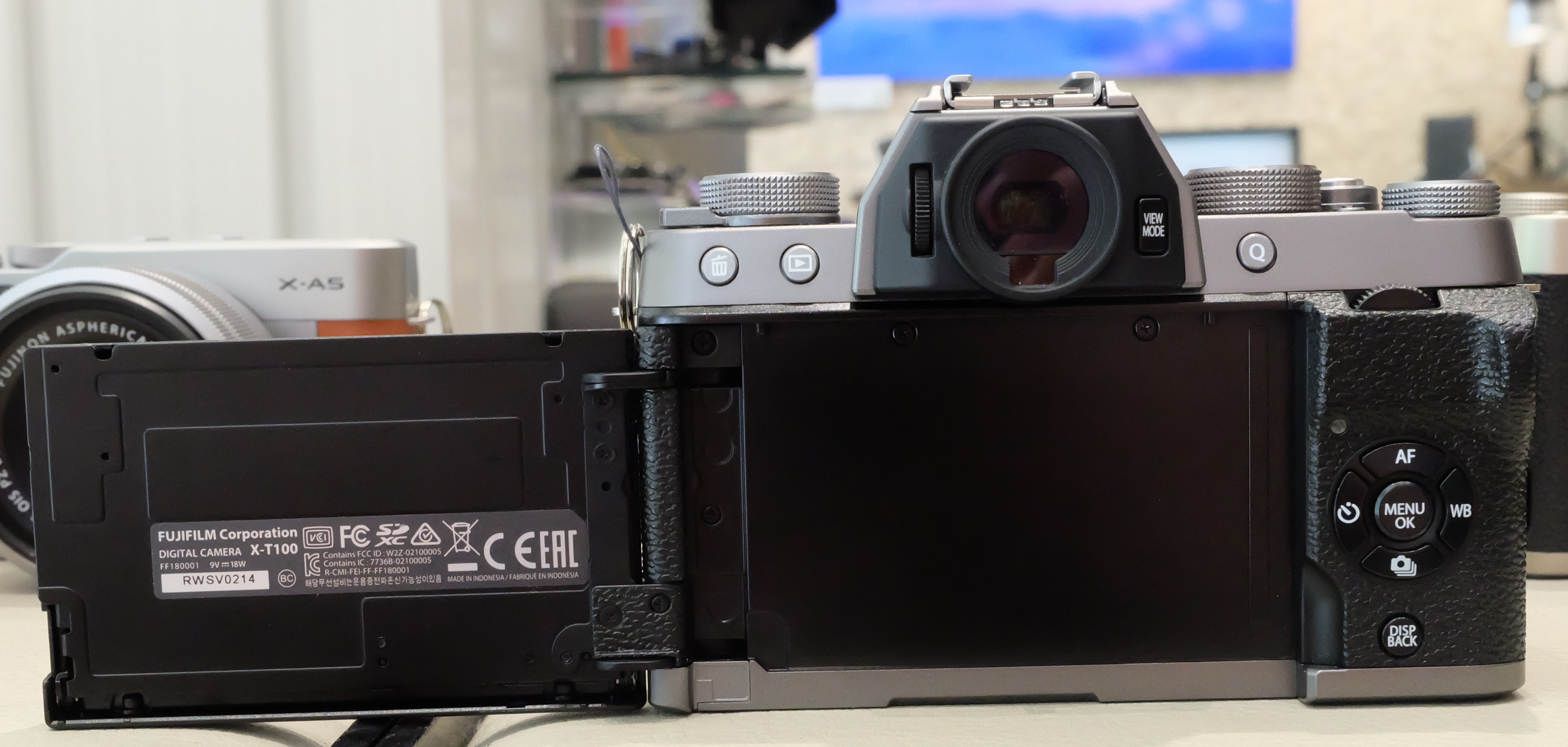

== See also ==
- List of retro-style digital cameras

Type	Lens	2011	2012	2013	2014	2015	2016	2017	2018	2019	2020	2021	2022	2023	2024	2025	2026
MILC	G-mount; Medium format sensor							GFX 50S ^{F} ^{T}					GFX 50S II ^{F} ^{T}				
MILC	G-mount; Medium format sensor									GFX 50R ^{F} ^{T}							
MILC	G-mount; Medium format sensor										GFX 100 ^{F} ^{T}					GFX 100 II ^{F} ^{T}	
MILC	G-mount; Medium format sensor											GFX 100 IR ^{F} ^{T}					
MILC	G-mount; Medium format sensor											GFX 100S ^{F} ^{T}				GFX 100S II ^{F} ^{T}	
MILC	G-mount; Medium format sensor															GFX Eterna 55 ^{F} ^{T}	
MILC	Prime lens Medium format sensor															GFX 100RF ^{F} ^{T}	
MILC	X-mount; APS-C sensor		X-Pro1				X-Pro2				X-Pro3 ^{f} ^{T}						
MILC	X-mount; APS-C sensor								X-H1 ^{F} ^{T}					X-H2 ^{A} ^{T}			
MILC	X-mount; APS-C sensor													X-H2S ^{A} ^{T}			
MILC	X-mount; APS-C sensor											X-S10 ^{A} ^{T}			X-S20 ^{A} ^{T}		
MILC	X-mount; APS-C sensor				X-T1 ^{f}			X-T2 ^{F}		X-T3 ^{F} ^{T}		X-T4 ^{A} ^{T}		X-T5 ^{F} ^{T}			
MILC	X-mount; APS-C sensor															X-T50 ^{f} ^{T}	
MILC	X-mount; APS-C sensor						X-T10 ^{f}	X-T20 ^{f} ^{T}		X-T30 ^{f} ^{T}			X-T30 II ^{f} ^{T}			X-T30 III ^{f} ^{T}	
MILC	X-mount; APS-C sensor									_{15} X-T100 ^{F} ^{T}	X-T200 ^{A} ^{T}						
MILC	X-mount; APS-C sensor			X-E1	X-E2		X-E2s		X-E3 ^{T}			X-E4 ^{f} ^{T}				X-E5 ^{f} ^{T}	
MILC	X-mount; APS-C sensor				X-M1 ^{f}											X-M5 ^{A} ^{T}	
MILC	X-mount; APS-C sensor				X-A1 ^{f}	X-A2 ^{f}		X-A3 ^{f} ^{T}	_{15} X-A5 ^{f} ^{T}		X-A7 ^{A} ^{T}						
MILC	X-mount; APS-C sensor							X-A10 ^{f}	X-A20 ^{f} ^{T}								
Compact	Prime lens APS-C sensor	X100		X100S		X100T		X100F			X100V ^{f} ^{T}				X100VI ^{f} ^{T}		
Compact	Prime lens APS-C sensor						X70 ^{f} ^{T}			XF10 ^{T}							
Compact	Prime lens 1" sensor															X half ^{T}	
Compact	Zoom lens^{2}/_{3}" sensor		X10	X20		X30 ^{f}											
Compact	Zoom lens^{2}/_{3}" sensor				XQ1	XQ2											
Compact	Zoom lens^{2}/_{3}" sensor			XF1													
Bridge	^{2}/_{3}" sensor		X-S1 ^{f}														
Type	Lens																
Type	Lens	2011	2012	2013	2014	2015	2016	2017	2018	2019	2020	2021	2022	2023	2024	2025	2026
