= Fujifilm X-T200 =

Camera

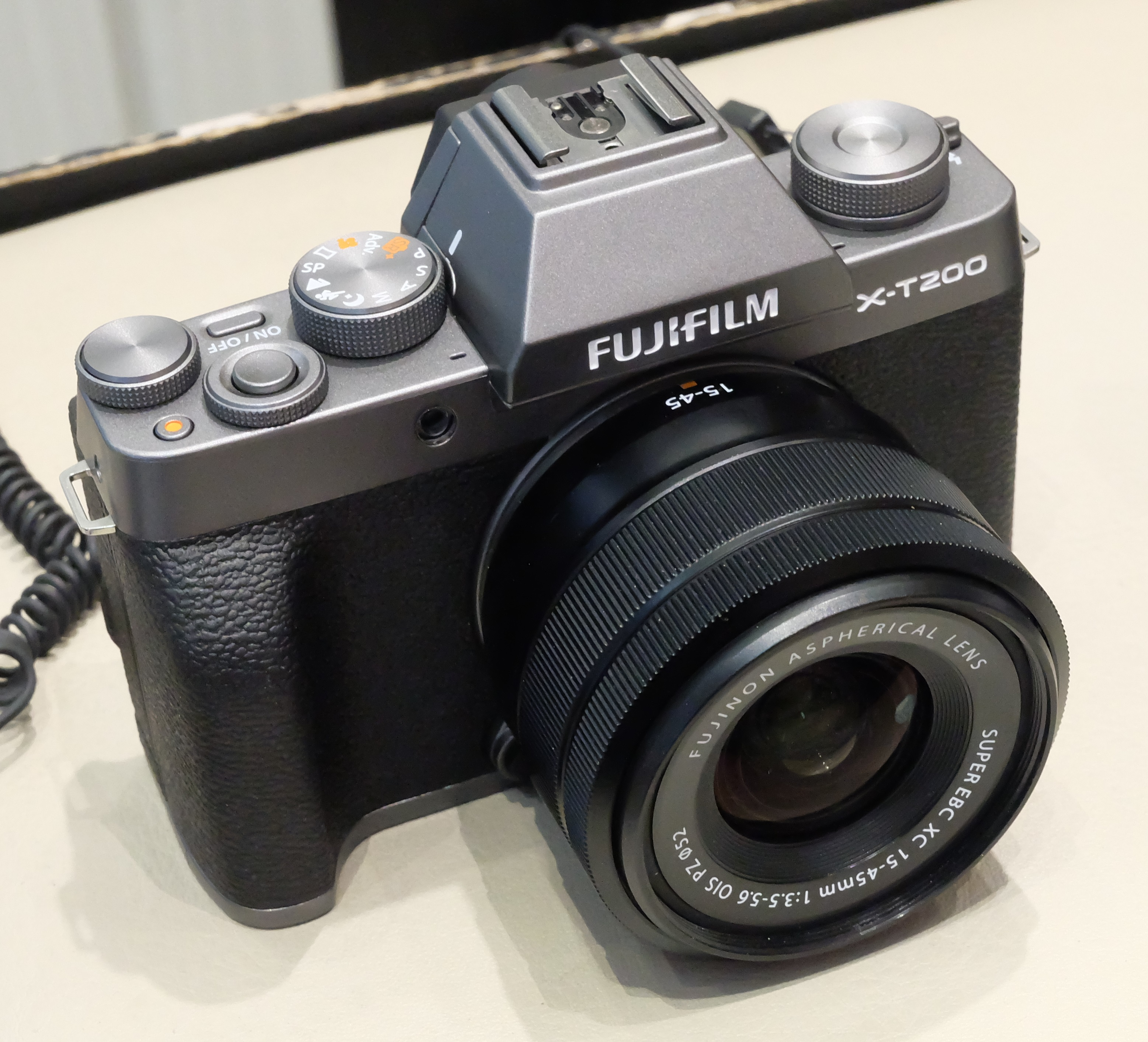
- X-T200 with 15-45mm f/3.5-5.6 lens

Overview
- Maker: Fujifilm
- Type: MILC
- Released: 23 January 2020; 5 years ago
- Intro price: USD 699 (body), USD 799 (kit)

Lens
- Lens mount: Fujifilm X
- Lens: Interchangeable lens
- Compatible lenses: Fujinon

Sensor/medium
- Sensor: APS-C
- Sensor type: CMOS with Bayer filter
- Sensor size: 23.5mm x 15.7mm
- Sensor maker: Sony
- Maximum resolution: 24.2 megapixels 6000 x 4000
- Film speed: 200–12800 (standard); 100–51200 (extend)
- Storage media: SD, SDHC, SDXC (UHS-I)

Focusing
- Focus: Intelligent Hybrid TTL contrast detection / Phase detection
- Focus modes: Single AF, Continuous AF, MF, AF+MF
- Focus areas: 91 focus point

Exposure/metering
- Exposure: TTL 256-zone metering
- Exposure modes: Program AE, Aperture Priority AE, Shutter Speed Priority AE, Manual Exposure
- Exposure metering: Through-the-lens
- Metering modes: Multi, Spot, Average

Flash
- Flash: Manual pop-up flash
- Flash synchronization: 1/180 s
- Compatible flashes: Shoe Mount flash

Shutter
- Shutter: Focal Plane Shutter
- Shutter speeds: 4 s to 1/8000 s (mechanical), 4 s to 1/32000 s (electronic)
- Continuous shooting: 8.0 fps

Viewfinder
- Viewfinder: EVF with eye sensor
- Electronic viewfinder: 0.39" 2,360K dots OLED viewfinder
- Viewfinder magnification: 0.62
- Frame coverage: 100%

Image processing
- White balance: Automatic Scene recognition, Custom, Color temperature selection, Daylight, Shade, Fluorescent, Incandescent, Underwater
- WB bracketing: ±1, ±2, ±3
- Dynamic range bracketing: 100% · 200% · 400%

General
- Video recording: MP4; 4K up to 30 fps, 1080p up to 120 fps
- LCD screen: 3.5" 2.78M dots touchscreen free-angle monitor
- Battery: NP-W126S Li-ion
- AV port(s): HDMI D, ⌀3.5 mm audio jack
- Data port(s): USB-C 3.1, Wi-Fi 4, Bluetooth 4.2
- Body features: Anodized aluminum body, Ultra Sonic Vibration Sensor Cleaning
- Dimensions: 121 mm × 83.7 mm × 55.1 mm (4.76 in × 3.30 in × 2.17 in)
- Weight: 370 g (13 oz) (0.82 lb) including battery and memory card
- Made in: Indonesia

Chronology
- Predecessor: Fujifilm X-T100

The Fujifilm X-T200 is a mid-range mirrorless interchangeable-lens camera announced on January 22, 2020. The X-T200 is the successor to the Fujifilm X-T100, but most features of the X-A7 are carried over to the X-T200.

The camera is capable of recording video in 4K resolution in 30 fps. It can be had in either camera body only, or with the 15–45 mm f/3.5-5.6 OIS PZ lens. The camera is styled after an SLR camera and comes in 3 colors, silver, dark silver and champagne gold.

== Key features ==
- Hybrid Electronic and Mechanical Horizontal Focal Plane shutter system gives up to 1/4000 sec, up to 60 min. in Bulb mode
- Main Subject Recognition
- 24.2 megapixels
- 23.5 mm x 15.7 mm CMOS sensor (APS-C). Bayer filter array with no anti-aliasing filter.
- Fully-articulate Touch Screen
- Selectable film simulations
- Hybrid autofocus
- Face detection
- Eye detection
- 4K video (15 min. max recording time)
- 4K Burst, 4K Multi Focus
- Wi-Fi connectivity
- Bluetooth connectivity
- 3.5mm audio jack
- USB-C
- Built-in grip

== Features ==
The X-T200 looks nearly identical to its predecessor, the X-T100. It is a mirrorless compact camera measuring 121 mm x 83.7 mm x 55.1 mm and weighing 370 g including memory card and battery, nearly 100g lighter than the X-T100.

The X-T200 is equipped with a Bayer type color filter array with no anti-aliasing filter. It is 3.5 times faster than the X-T100 at data processing, due to the copper wiring, where the X-T100 uses aluminum.

The camera has Wi-Fi connectivity complemented by Bluetooth for connection and tagging via a smartphone. It comes in three different colors, Dark Silver, Silver and Champagne Gold.

Unlike the X-T100, the X-T200 is equipped with a joystick instead of a directional pad. Its LCD screen is fully articulated, unlike the X-T100's 3-way tilt.

Other noticeable improvements are the ability to record in 4K is 30 fps, a 3.5mm audio jack and a USB-C connection, X-T100 only has a microUSB, a 2.5mm audio jack and can only do 4K in 15fps. Compared to the X-T100 that can take 430 photographs per charge, the X-T200 can only take 270 per charge. The X-T100's grip is screw-on, whereas the X-T200 grip is built-in. The X-T200 is also $100 more than its predecessor.

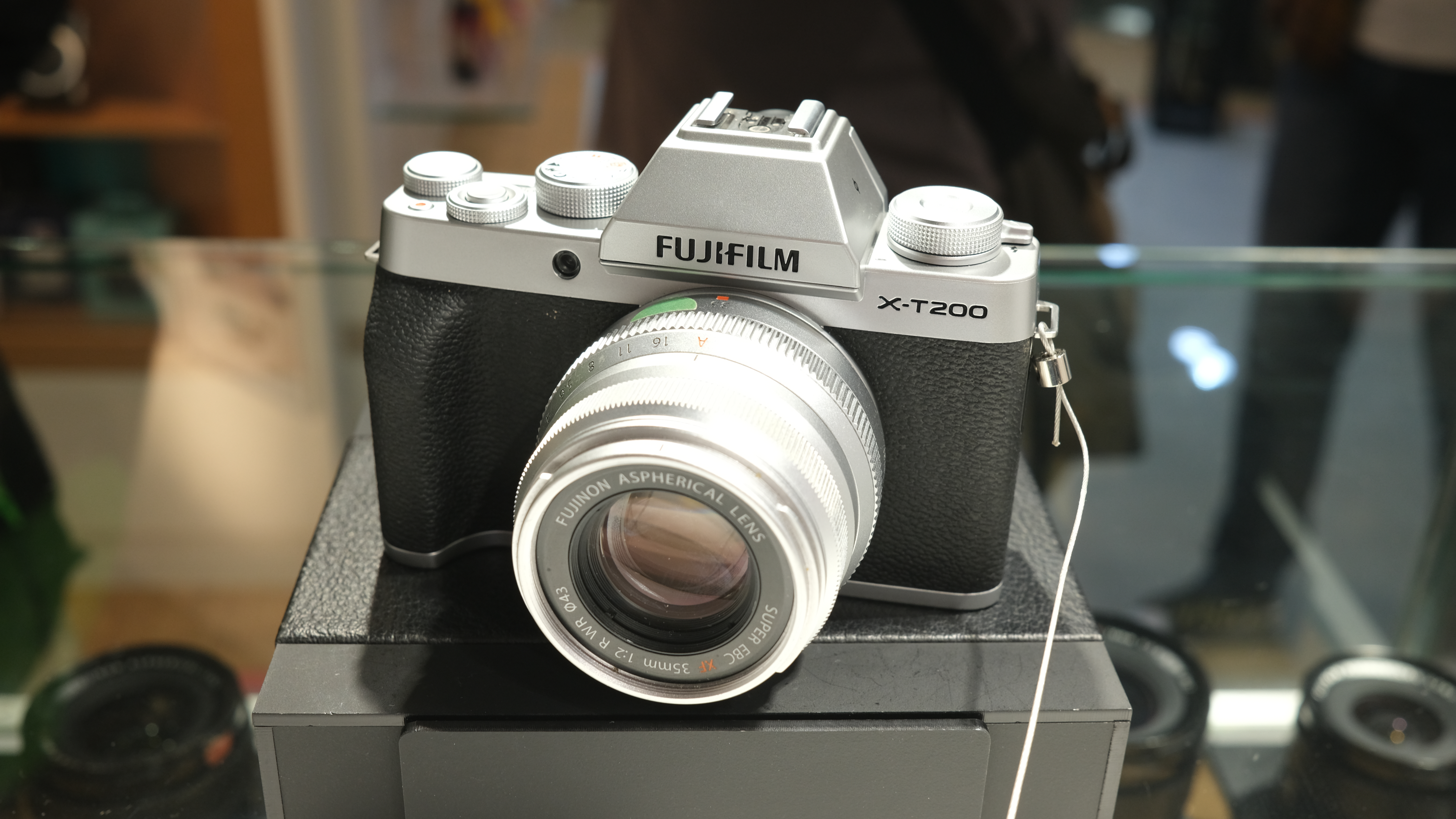

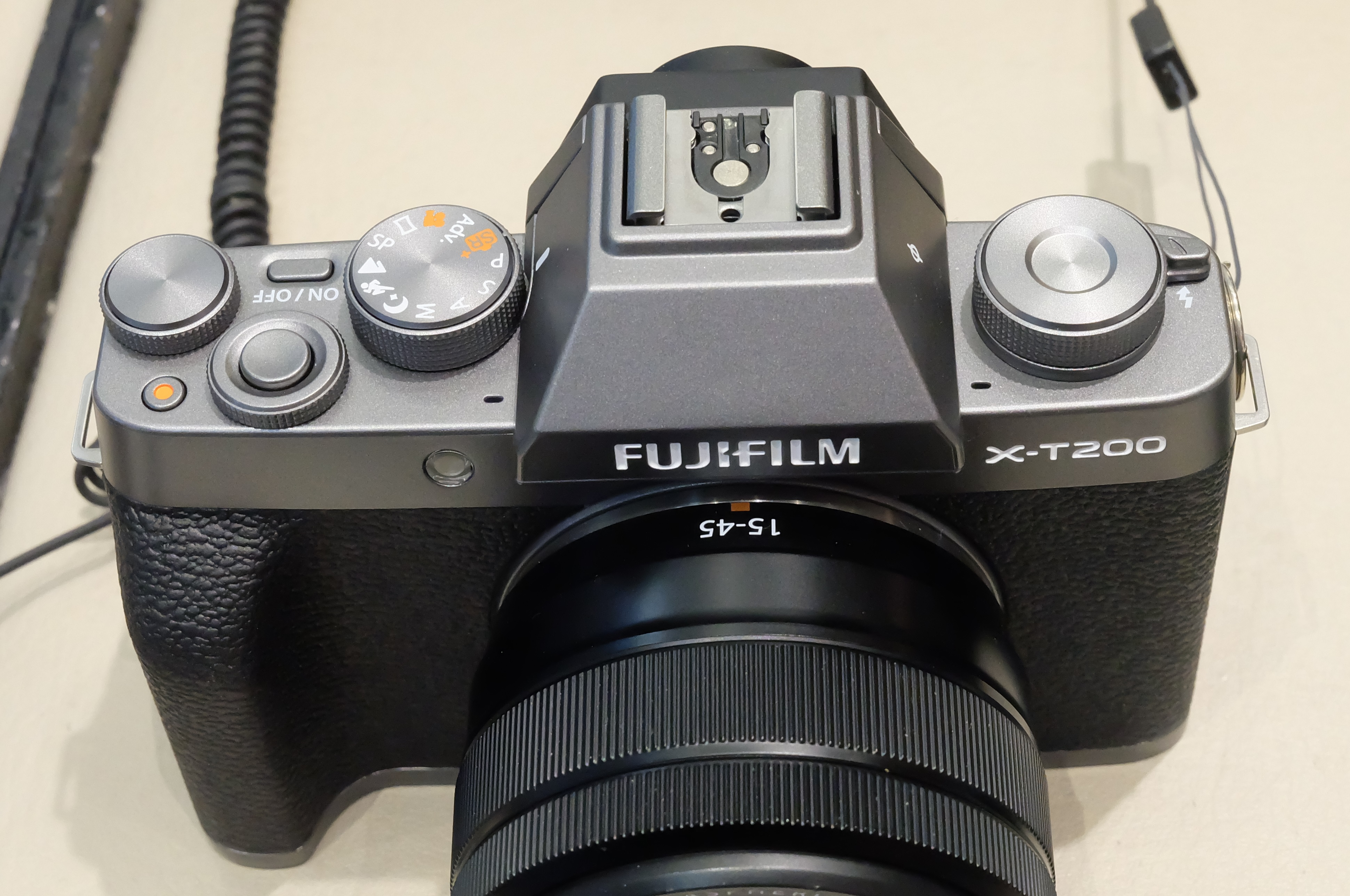

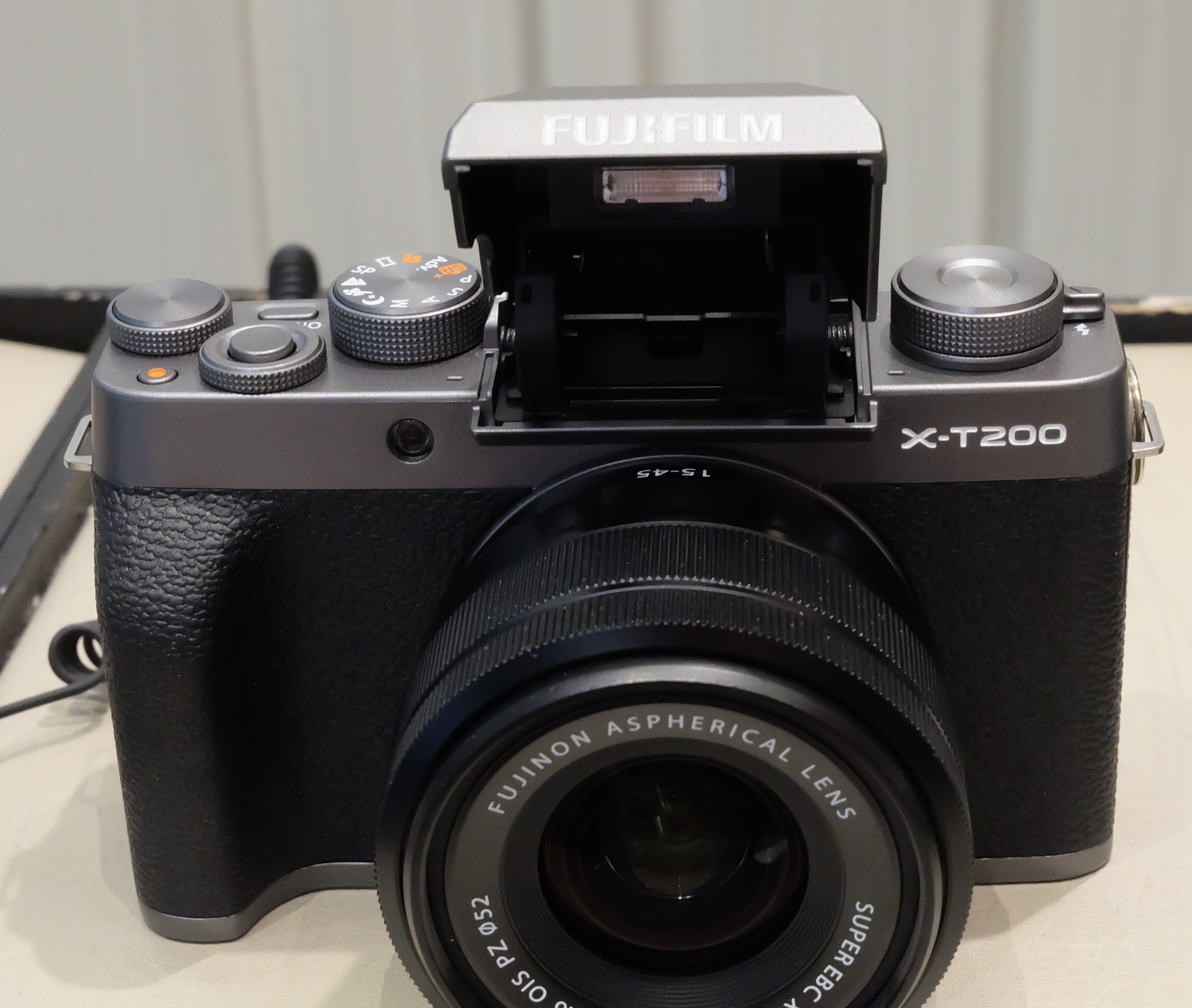

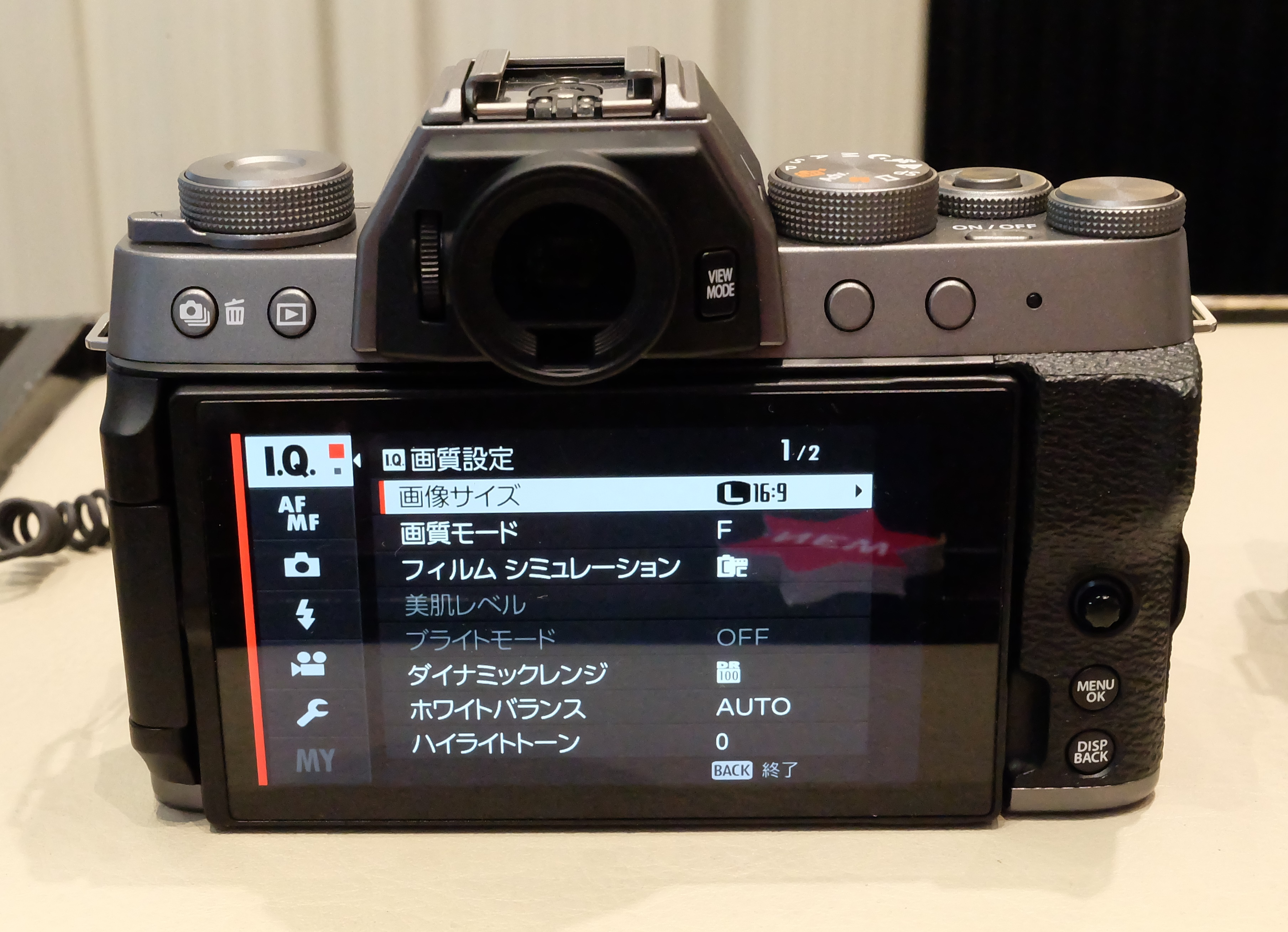

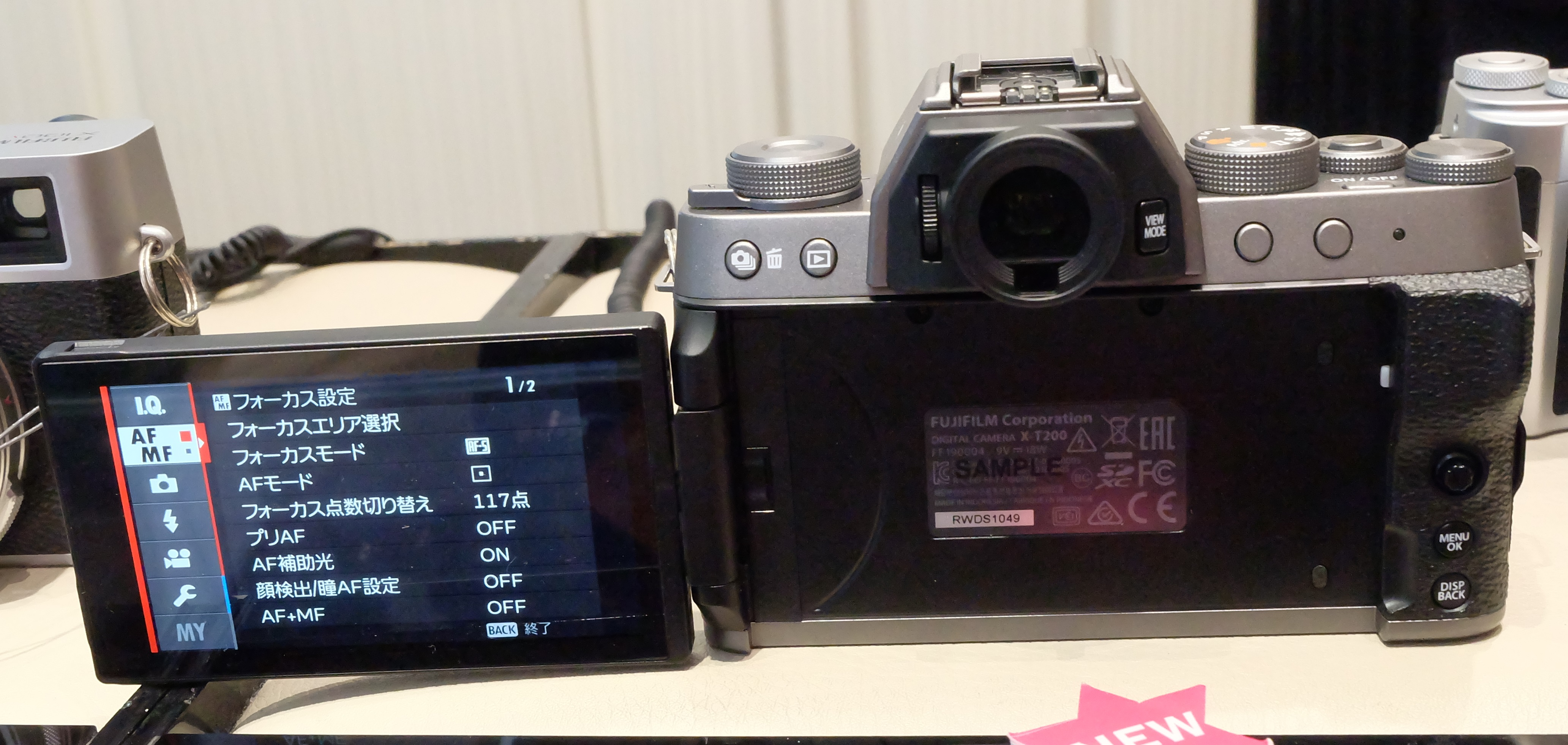

== Included accessories ==
- Li-ion battery NP-W126S
- USB cable
- Headphone Adapter
- Shoulder strap
- Body cap
- Owner's manual

== See also ==
- List of retro-style digital cameras

Type	Lens	2011	2012	2013	2014	2015	2016	2017	2018	2019	2020	2021	2022	2023	2024	2025
MILC	G-mount; Medium format sensor							GFX 50S ^{F} ^{T}					GFX 50S II ^{F} ^{T}			
MILC	G-mount; Medium format sensor									GFX 50R ^{F} ^{T}						
MILC	G-mount; Medium format sensor										GFX 100 ^{F} ^{T}					GFX 100 II ^{F} ^{T}
MILC	G-mount; Medium format sensor											GFX 100 IR ^{F} ^{T}				
MILC	G-mount; Medium format sensor											GFX 100S ^{F} ^{T}				GFX 100S II^{F} ^{T}
MILC	G-mount; Medium format sensor															GFX Eterna 55^{F} ^{T}
MILC	Prime lens Medium format sensor															GFX 100RF ^{F} ^{T}
MILC	X-mount; APS-C sensor		X-Pro1				X-Pro2				X-Pro3 ^{f} ^{T}					
MILC	X-mount; APS-C sensor								X-H1 ^{F} ^{T}					X-H2 ^{A} ^{T}		
MILC	X-mount; APS-C sensor													X-H2S ^{A} ^{T}		
MILC	X-mount; APS-C sensor											X-S10 ^{A} ^{T}			X-S20 ^{A} ^{T}	
MILC	X-mount; APS-C sensor				X-T1 ^{f}			X-T2 ^{F}		X-T3 ^{F} ^{T}		X-T4 ^{A} ^{T}		X-T5 ^{F} ^{T}		
MILC	X-mount; APS-C sensor						X-T10 ^{f}	X-T20 ^{f} ^{T}		X-T30 ^{f} ^{T}			X-T30 II ^{f} ^{T}			X-T50 ^{f} ^{T}
MILC	X-mount; APS-C sensor									_{15} X-T100 ^{F} ^{T}	X-T200 ^{A} ^{T}					
MILC	X-mount; APS-C sensor			X-E1	X-E2		X-E2s		X-E3 ^{T}			X-E4 ^{f} ^{T}				X-E5 ^{f} ^{T}
MILC	X-mount; APS-C sensor				X-M1 ^{f}											X-M5 ^{A} ^{T}
MILC	X-mount; APS-C sensor				X-A1 ^{f}	X-A2 ^{f}		X-A3 ^{f} ^{T}	_{15} X-A5 ^{f} ^{T}		X-A7 ^{A} ^{T}					
MILC	X-mount; APS-C sensor							X-A10 ^{f}	X-A20 ^{f} ^{T}							
Compact	Prime lens APS-C sensor	X100		X100S		X100T		X100F			X100V ^{f} ^{T}				X100VI ^{f} ^{T}	
Compact	Prime lens APS-C sensor						X70 ^{f} ^{T}			XF10 ^{T}						
Compact	Prime lens 1" sensor															X half ^{T}
Compact	Zoom lens^{2}/_{3}" sensor		X10	X20		X30 ^{f}										
Compact	Zoom lens^{2}/_{3}" sensor				XQ1	XQ2										
Compact	Zoom lens^{2}/_{3}" sensor			XF1												
Bridge	^{2}/_{3}" sensor		X-S1 ^{f}													
Type	Lens															
Type	Lens	2011	2012	2013	2014	2015	2016	2017	2018	2019	2020	2021	2022	2023	2024	2025
