= Sharp Aquos Phone Xx mini =

2014 mobile phone

AQUOS PHONE Xx mini SoftBank 303SH
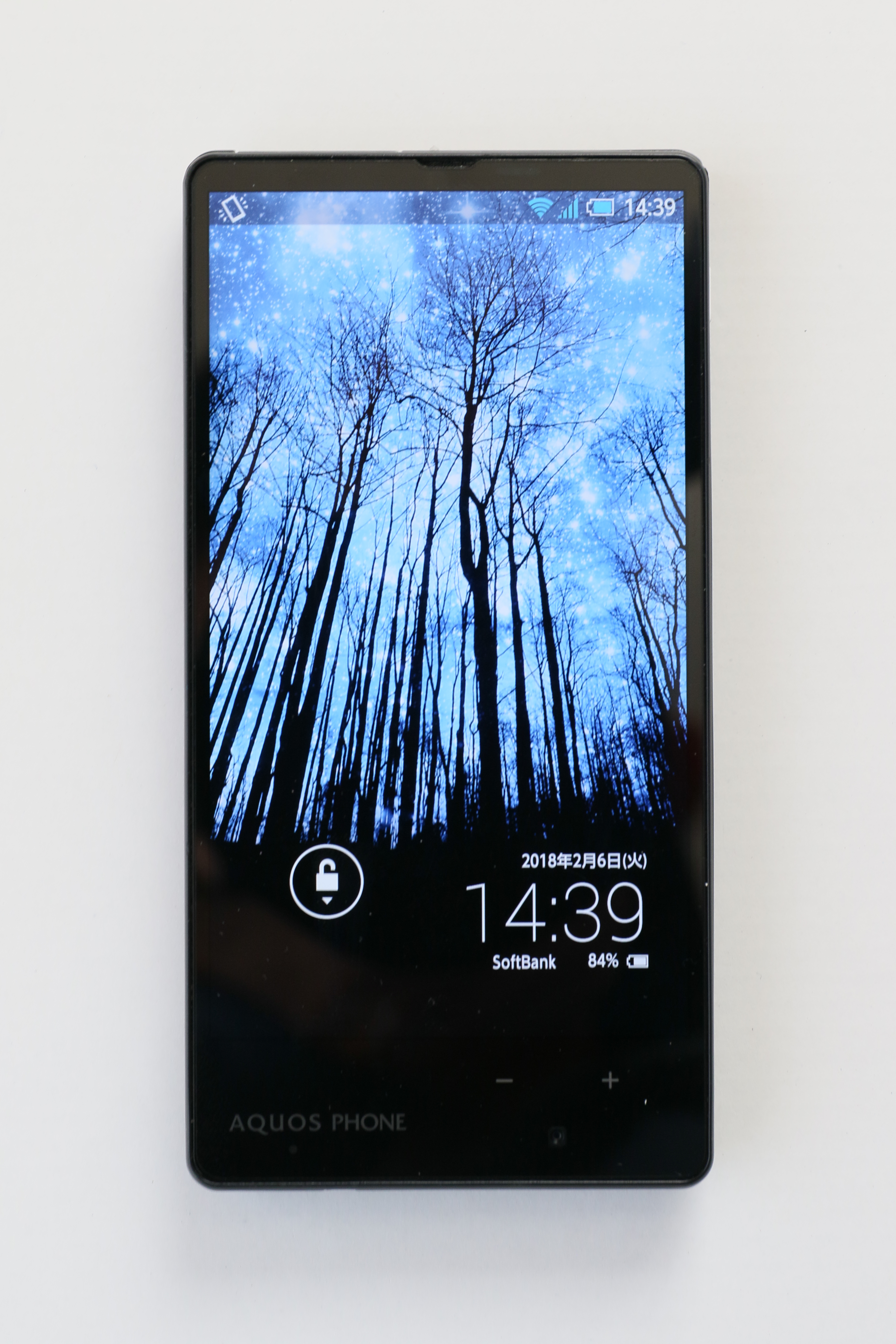
- Brand: SoftBank Mobile
- Manufacturer: Sharp Corporation
- First released: February 21, 2014; 12 years ago
- Compatible networks: SoftBank 3G (W-CDMA, 900 MHz band supported); GSM; 3.9G: SoftBank 4G (AXGP) / SoftBank 4G LTE (FDD-LTE); 2G: EDGE; Wi-Fi: IEEE 802.11 a/b/g/n/ac (Wi-Fi certified)
- Form factor: Bar
- Colors: Turquoise; Black; White; Red; Blue; Gold; Light Pink; Vivid Pink
- Dimensions: 124 mm (4.9 in) H 63 mm (2.5 in) W 9.8 mm (0.39 in) D
- Weight: 117 g (4.1 oz)
- Operating system: Android 4.2
- CPU: 2.2 GHz quad-core Qualcomm Snapdragon 800 (MSM8974)
- Memory: 2 GB RAM
- Storage: 16 GB ROM
- Removable storage: microSD (up to 2 GB), microSDHC (up to 32 GB), microSDXC (up to 64 GB)
- Battery: 2,120 mAh
- Rear camera: Approx. 13 megapixels, backside-illuminated CMOS image sensor, 1080p FHD video recording, image stabilization, face recognition, voice-activated shutter
- Front camera: 1.2 megapixels, CMOS image sensor
- Display: 4.5-inch IGZO FHD (1920 × 1080 pixels), approx. 16.77 million colors
- Model: 303SH
- Website: Product Page

The AQUOS PHONE Xx mini 303SH is a mobile phone developed by Sharp Corporation for SoftBank Mobile, supporting 3.9G mobile telecommunication systems (SoftBank 4G / SoftBank 4G LTE). Part of the SoftBank Smartphone series, it operates on the Android 4.2 platform.

While branded under the AQUOS PHONE banner rather than the PANTONE lineup, it serves as the de facto successor to the PANTONE 6 200SH and stands as a derivative iteration of the AQUOS PHONE Xx 302SH.

Carrying the "Xx" moniker, Sharp markets the device as a "compact high-end model."

The device largely retains the core technical performance of the 302SH, but excludes a built-in Full Seg TV tuner. In its place, the handset integrates an IGZO liquid-crystal display, which was omitted from the 302SH.

== Specifications ==
=== Design ===
The device is rated IPX5/IPX7 for water resistance and supports features such as Osaifu-Keitai (mobile wallet), NFC, infrared communication, Wi-Fi tethering, and 1Seg mobile TV, though it lacks Full Seg capabilities. A notable software feature is Sharp's proprietary "Translation Finder" (Honyaku Finder), which translates English text to Japanese in real time via the camera. This feature integrates with an onboard English-Japanese dictionary and allows users to search words or images on the web. Equipped with a 2,120 mAh battery, the handset is rated for two days of usage. It measures approximately 63 × 124 × 9.9 mm, weighs 117 grams, and was launched in eight color variants: Turquoise, Black, White, Red, Blue, Gold, Light Pink, and Vivid Pink.

=== Hardware and connectivity ===
The smartphone features a 13.1-megapixel rear CMOS camera and a 1.2-megapixel front-facing CMOS camera, with expandable storage via a microSDXC card slot. Powered by a 2.2 GHz quad-core Qualcomm Snapdragon 800 (MSM8974) processor, the device includes 2 GB of RAM and 16 GB of internal storage. Its connectivity suite comprises dual-band Wi-Fi (IEEE 802.11a/b/g/n/ac) and Bluetooth 4.0. For network compatibility, it supports domestic W-CDMA, FDD-LTE, and AXGP bands, alongside international roaming capabilities on W-CDMA, FDD-LTE, and GSM networks.
