= Docomo STYLE series L-01C =

2010 mobile phone model

docomo STYLE series L-01C
- Brand: NTT Docomo
- Manufacturer: LG Electronics
- Type: Feature phone
- Series: docomo STYLE series
- First released: December 22, 2010; 15 years ago
- Predecessor: L-03B
- Compatible networks: 3G: FOMA (W-CDMA / HSDPA); 2G: GSM (EDGE)
- Form factor: Clamshell
- Colors: Deep Red; Metallic Black; Platinum White
- Dimensions: 109 mm (4.3 in) H 50 mm (2.0 in) W 16.5 mm (0.65 in) D
- Weight: 128 g (4.5 oz)
- Removable storage: microSD (up to 2 GB), microSDHC (up to 16 GB)
- Rear camera: 5.1 MP CMOS with autofocus and image stabilization
- Front camera: None
- Display: Main: 2.8 in (71 mm) TFT LCD, 240×400 px, 262,144 colors Sub: 0.9 in (23 mm) LED Matrix, 128×36 px, 1 color
- Water resistance: IPX5/IPX7
- Model: L-01C

The docomo STYLE series L-01C is a 3G (FOMA) mobile phone terminal developed by LG Electronics for NTT Docomo, belonging to the docomo STYLE series lineup.

== History ==
- August 2, 2010 – Passed Federal Communications Commission (FCC) certification.
- August 19, 2010 – Passed Japan Approvals Institute for Telecommunications Equipment (JATE) certification.
- November 8, 2010 – NTT Docomo officially announced the development and upcoming release of its 2010–2011 winter/spring lineup, including the L-01C alongside models such as the F-01C, F-02C, L-02C, L-03C, Optimus chat L-04C, SH-03C, REGZA Phone T-01C, and others.
- December 22, 2010 – Official release and sales began.

== Specifications ==
=== Hardware ===
The L-01C serves as the functional successor to the L-03B. While LG Electronics introduced high-performance models for the 2010–2011 winter/spring lineup—including optical zoom phones, smartphones, and LTE (Xi)-compatible devices—the L-01C was positioned as an easy and simple device with a streamlined feature set. Consequently, features such as Osaifu-Keitai (mobile wallet), GPS, 2in1 multi-number services, and i-concierge were omitted. The target audience includes business users and middle-aged to older demographics who prioritize affordable hardware costs, basic voice calls, email, and simple i-mode browsing over high-end features. However, it retains 1seg mobile TV support and IPX5/IPX7 waterproof protection.

The exterior adopts a rounded, easy-to-hold design, featuring a sub-display positioned near the hinge. Keyboards and text sizes are enlarged for readability, accompanied by dedicated hardware shortcut buttons such as "My Function" for quick access to frequently used features and "My Contact" to display priority contacts.

The primary camera utilizes a 5.1-megapixel CMOS sensor with autofocus, image stabilization for still photos, and a digital magnifying glass mode.

=== Software ===
As characteristic of LG mobile phones released in Japan, the user interface supports multilingual switching between Japanese, English, and Korean for menus and text input, allowing users to compose and send emails in Korean.

Pre-installed software is minimal to cater to business users, requiring additional applications such as Docomo Webmail to be downloaded via Docomo Market as needed. Pre-installed applications include:

- Nihon Isshu Kanji no Tabi (Kanji quiz game)
- Onsen Tengoku (Hot spring dictionary and game)
- Rakuraku Mahjong
- E★Everystar App (Real-time updates for mobile magazine content)
- Rakuoku Auction App 2 (Listing and bidding tool for Rakuten Auction)
- Mingle Mangle (Puzzle game)
- Battle Reversi
- Mobile Google Maps
- G-Guide Program Guide Remote Control (TV guide and remote function)
- i-appli Banking (Mobile banking application)
- Puttchin Puzzle (Trial version)

Mobile 1seg TV features include a continuous viewing time of approximately 220 minutes, pre-installed Electronic Program Guide (EPG), closed captioning support, and viewing reservation timers.

== See also ==
- L-03B
- Optimus chat L-04C
