= PFCA =

PFCA may refer to:

== Biology ==
- Protein-fragment complementation assay

== Chemistry ==
- Perfluorinated carboxylic acid

== Sensing Technology ==
- The Planar Fourier Capture Array, a tiny camera built entirely in standard CMOS
