= Kobian =

Robot created at Waseda University, Japan

Kobian is a robot created by scientists at Waseda University in Japan. It is capable of displaying expressions of emotion and was developed to realize culture-specific greetings. It can also simulate human speech including the movement of the lips and the oscillations of the head.

Kobian is based on the WABIAN-2R robot and the emotion expression humanoid robot called WE-4RII and is 1,470 mm tall and weighs 62 kilograms. The robot's two eyeballs are outfitted with CMOS cameras. It is a bi-pedal standalone robot with control units such as motor drivers placed in the robotic head, making this particular part larger than the human head. The robotic head for the Kobian-R, the newer and more downsized version of the robot, has 24 degrees of freedom (DoFs) and a blue facial color due to an electro luminescence sheet. The original Kobian robot has a DoF of 48. Two versions of the Kobian-Rs have been built - a Western and a Japanese variant - to develop the system that produces the robot's facial cues.

The Kobian robot has another version called Debian, which has a slightly different facial and body color to provide these robots distinctions when interacting with each other and with other subjects. The color has no cultural significance.

== See also ==
- Robotics
