= Intrapixel and Interpixel processing =

Intrapixel and Interpixel processing is used in the processing of computers graphics, as well as sensors and images in equipment such as cameras. For computer graphics, CMOS sensor processing is done in pixel level.

This process includes two general categories: intrapixel processing, where the processing is performed on the individual pixel signals, and interpixel processing, where the processing is performed locally or globally on signals from several pixels. The purpose of interpixel processing is to perform early vision processing, not merely to capture images.

Intrapixel and Interpixel processing is an integral part of spatial processing within the earth Mixed Spatial Attraction Model. This also includes use within hyperspectral image processing.

== See also ==
- Active-pixel sensor
- CCD
- CMOS
- Digital image processing
- Image resolution
- Image sensor
- Pixel
- Sensor
