= Dexel =

The term Dexel has two common uses: Dexel ("depth pixel") is a concept used for a discretized representation of functions defined on surfaces used in geometrical modeling and physical simulation, sometimes also referred to as multilevel Z-map. Dexel is a nodal value of a scalar or vector field on a meshed surface. Dexels are used in simulation of manufacturing processes (such as turning, milling or rapid prototyping), when workpiece surfaces are subject to modifications. It is practical to express the surface evolution by dexels especially when the surface evolution scale is very different from the structural finite element 3D model discretization step (e.g. in machining the depth of cut variation is often several orders of magnitude smaller (1–10 μm) than the FE model mesh step (1 mm)).

Dexel ("detector element") is the analog of a pixel ("picture element") but native to a detector rather than a visible picture. That is, it describes the elements in a detector, which may be processed, combined, resampled, or otherwise mangled, before creating a picture. As such, there may not be a one-to-one correspondence between the pixels in an image, and the dexels used to create that image. For example, cameras labeled as "10-megapixel" can be used to create a 640x480 picture. Using dexel terminology, the camera actually uses 10 million dexels to create a picture with 640x480 pixels.
