= Angle-sensitive pixel =

Type of light sensor

An angle-sensitive pixel (ASP) is a CMOS sensor with a sensitivity to incoming light that is sinusoidal in incident angle.

== Principles of operation ==
Simulation of light interacting with an ASP. Light from a range of incident angles (arrows at top) is refracted by the SiO_{2} surface and interacts with the top diffraction grating. Metals (made from intrinsic CMOS interconnects, shown in black) create a top and a bottom grating. The top grating creates a Talbot pattern at the depth of the bottom grating, which lines up with either opaque metal or transparent gap in the lower, analyzer grating, depending on incident angle. A large photodiode below measures the light flux through the analyzer grating, which is a sinusoidal function of incident angle.

ASPs are typically composed of two gratings (a diffraction grating and an analyzer grating) above a single photodiode. ASPs exploit the moire effect and the Talbot effect to gain their sinusoidal light sensitivity. According to the moire effect, if light acted as a particle, at certain incident angles the gaps in the diffraction and analyzer gratings line up, while at other incident angles light passed by the diffraction grating is blocked by the analyzer grating. The amount of light reaching the photodiode would be proportional to a sinusoidal function of incident angle, as the two gratings come in and out of phase with each other with shifting incident angle. The wave nature of light becomes important at small scales such as those in ASPs, meaning a pure-moire model of ASP function is insufficient. However, at half-integer multiples of the Talbot depth, the periodicity of the diffraction grating is recapitulated, and the moire effect is rescued. By building ASPs where the vertical separation between the gratings is approximately equal to a half-integer multiple of the Talbot depth, the sinusoidal sensitivity with incident angle is observed.

== Applications ==
ASPs can be used in miniature imaging devices. They do not require any focusing elements to achieve sinusoidal incident angle sensitivity, meaning that they can be deployed without a lens to image the near field, or the far field using a Fourier-complete planar Fourier capture array. They can also be used in conjunction with a lens, in which case they perform a depth-sensitive, physics-based wavelet transform of the far-away scene, allowing single-lens 3D photography similar to that of the Lytro camera.

== See also ==
- Planar Fourier capture array
