= Planar Fourier capture array =

Imaging Technology

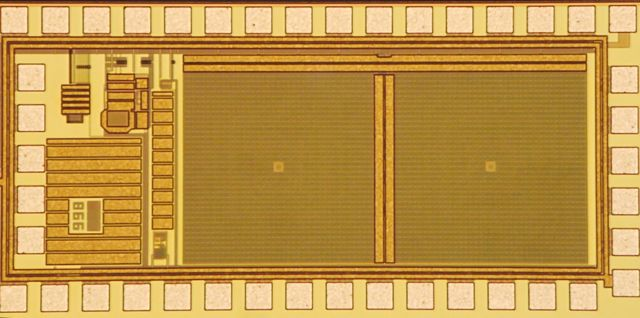
Light micrograph of the first prototype PFCA. The two square regions are complementary PFCAs, each of which 570 μm across, and the larger squares are bond pads.

Using complete information from one PFCA, it is possible to reconstruct the image presented up to the Nyquist limit set by the highest-frequency angle-sensitive pixel of the PFCA. In this example, an image of the Mona Lisa was presented to the PFCA with a capture time of 16.7 ms, and this image was computationally reconstructed.

A planar Fourier capture array (PFCA) is a tiny camera that requires no mirror, lens, focal length, or moving parts. It is composed of angle-sensitive pixels, which can be manufactured in unmodified CMOS processes.

Angle-sensitive pixels have a sensitivity to light that is sinusoidal in incident angle along the optically-sensitive axis, which can be interpreted as measuring one component of the 2D Fourier transform of the far-away scene. By making them all unique, each sensor of the PFCA relates a distinct component of the 2D Fourier transform of the far-away scene, and together they relate full Fourier information. Original images are reconstructed computationally after acquisition, or if raw Fourier coefficients are more useful for the application at hand, they are used directly.

PFCAs do not perform an exact Fourier transform since outputs are real-valued and are not perfect sinusoidal transforms of the image. The transform is closer to a Hartley transform, but even this correspondence is not exact. Still, the mathematics underlying completeness of the Fourier transform are useful in designing and understanding PFCAs.

Because PFCAs do not require focusing optics or moving parts, they can be made smaller than the smallest focusing camera. Counting only the active portions of the PFCA (and not the structural substrate giving it physical robustness), PFCAs are a factor of 10^{5} smaller than the smallest focusing camera by volume.

== See also ==
- Charge-coupled device
- Active pixel sensor
- Superlens
