= Pixel =

Smallest addressable element of a raster image

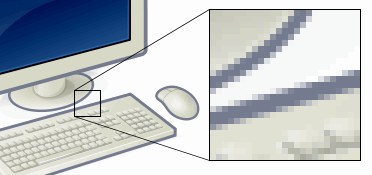
This example shows an image with a portion greatly enlarged so that individual pixels, rendered as small squares, can easily be seen.

In digital imaging, a pixel (abbreviated px), pel, or picture element is the smallest addressable element of a raster image. In a display device, dot matrix printer, or ASCII art a pixel is the smallest element whose output can generally be controlled independently.

The concept of a picture element dates to the earliest days of electronic imaging. The German word Bildpunkt ("picture point") appeared in an 1888 patent, while the English term picture element appeared in U.S. patents filed as early as 1911. The word pixel was first published in 1965.

Pixels are usually arranged in a regular two-dimensional grid, with each pixel storing one or more numerical values that represent a sample of an image. A greater sampling density can represent finer spatial detail, although the result also depends on the optics, sensor, processing, and display. In color imaging, a pixel is commonly represented by components such as red, green, and blue (RGB), or cyan, magenta, yellow, and black (CMYK).

In some contexts (such as descriptions of camera sensors), pixel refers to a single scalar element of a multi-component representation (called a photosite in the camera sensor context, although sensel 'sensor element' is sometimes used), while in yet other contexts (like MRI) it may refer to a set of component intensities for a spatial position.

Software on early consumer computers was necessarily rendered at a low resolution, with large pixels visible to the naked eye; graphics made under these limitations may be called pixel art, especially in reference to video games. Modern computers and displays, however, can easily render orders of magnitude more pixels than was previously possible, necessitating the use of large measurements like the megapixel (one million pixels).

== Etymology ==
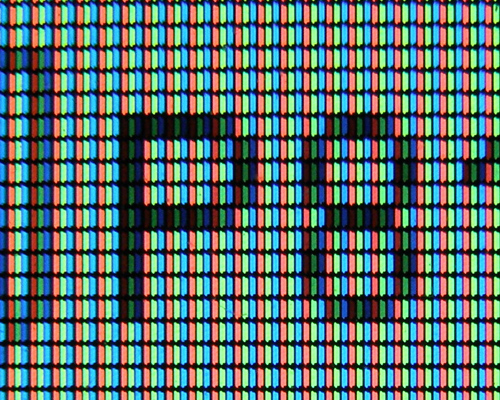
A photograph of subpixel display elements on a laptop's LCD screen

The word pixel is a combination of pix (from "pictures", shortened to "pics") and el (for "element"); similar formations with 'el' include the words voxel 'volume pixel', and texel 'texture pixel'. The word pix appeared in Variety magazine headlines in 1932, as an abbreviation for the word pictures, in reference to movies. By 1938, "pix" was being used in reference to still pictures by photojournalists.

The word "pixel" was first published in 1965 by Frederic C. Billingsley of JPL, to describe the picture elements of scanned images from space probes to the Moon and Mars. Billingsley had learned the word from Keith E. McFarland, at the Link Division of General Precision in Palo Alto, who in turn said he did not know where it originated. McFarland said simply it was "in use at the time" (c. 1963).

The concept of a "picture element" dates to the earliest days of television, for example as "Bildpunkt" (the German word for pixel, literally 'picture point') in the 1888 German patent of Paul Nipkow. According to various etymologies, the earliest publication of the term picture element itself was in Wireless World magazine in 1927, though it had been used earlier in various U.S. patents filed as early as 1911.

Some authors explain pixel as picture cell, as early as 1972. In graphics and in image and video processing, pel is often used instead of pixel. For example, IBM used it in their Technical Reference for the original PC.

Pixilation, spelled with a second i, is an unrelated filmmaking technique that dates to the beginnings of cinema, in which live actors are posed frame by frame and photographed to create stop-motion animation. An archaic British word meaning "possession by spirits (pixies)", the term has been used to describe the animation process since the early 1950s; various animators, including Norman McLaren and Grant Munro, are credited with popularizing it.

== Technical ==
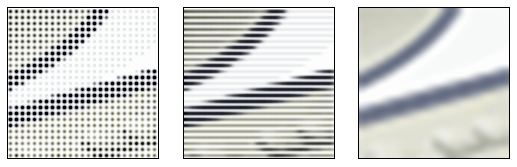
A pixel does not need to be rendered as a small square. This image shows alternative ways of reconstructing an image from a set of pixel values, using dots, lines, or smooth filtering.

A pixel is generally thought of as the smallest component of a digital image, but its precise meaning depends on context. A pixel may refer to a numerical sample in an image file, an element in a transmitted image signal, a controllable picture element on a display, a printed image sample, or a photosensitive element in a digital camera. Related terms include pel, sample, dot, photosite, and sensel, although they are not interchangeable in every context. Pixel counts are also used as measurements, for example 2,400 pixels per inch or 640 pixels per line.

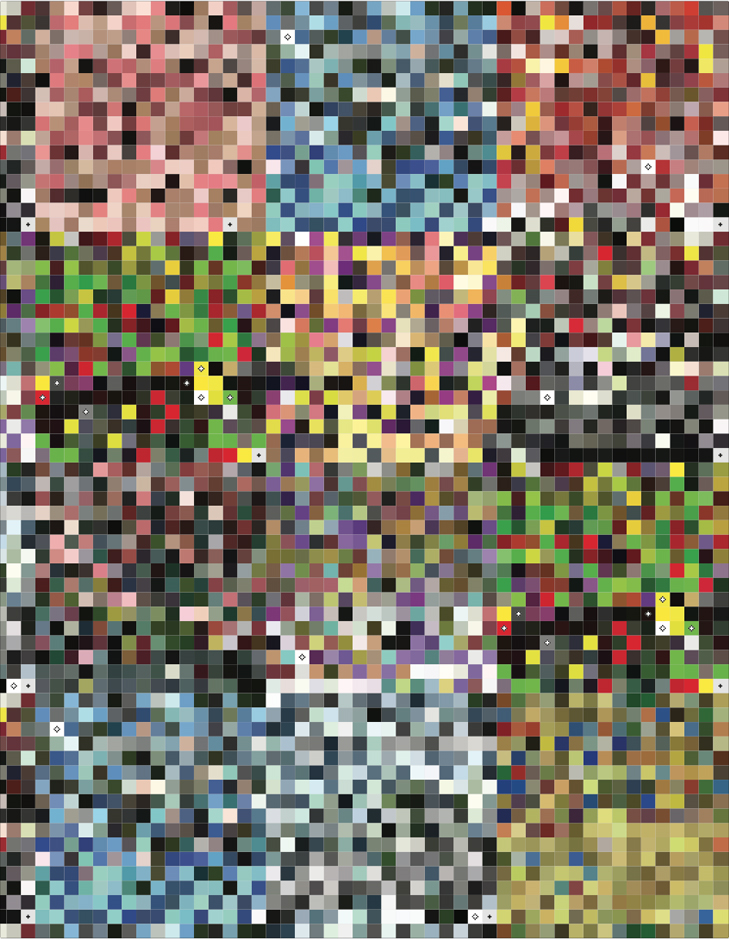
Pixel art

The measures "dots per inch" (dpi) and "pixels per inch" (ppi) are sometimes used interchangeably, but they describe different quantities. Ppi describes the sampling density of a digital image or display, while printer dpi describes the density of physical marks such as ink droplets. A printer may use a full character (ASCII art) or several dots to reproduce one image pixel; for example, an image sampled at 600 ppi may be printed by a 1,200 dpi inkjet printer. Printer dpi therefore cannot be compared directly with image ppi as a measure of effective resolution.

Increasing the number of samples can preserve finer detail, provided that the image source and imaging system contain that detail. Pixel count is often informally called "resolution", although image resolution can also refer to spatial resolving power or sampling density. Pixel counts may be expressed as a single number, such as three megapixels, or as dimensions. A 640 × 480 VGA image contains 307,200 pixels, or about 0.3 megapixels.

The pixels, or color samples, that form a digitized image (such as a JPEG file used on a web page) may or may not be in one-to-one correspondence with screen pixels, depending on how a computer displays an image. In computing, an image composed of pixels is known as a bitmapped image or a raster image. The word raster originates from television scanning patterns, and has been widely used to describe similar halftone printing and storage techniques.

=== Sampling patterns ===
For convenience, pixels are normally arranged in a regular two-dimensional grid. By using this arrangement, many common operations can be implemented by uniformly applying the same operation to each pixel independently. Other arrangements of pixels are possible, with some sampling patterns even changing the shape (or kernel) of each pixel across the image. For this reason, care must be taken when acquiring an image on one device and displaying it on another, or when converting image data from one pixel format to another.

For example:

Subpixel text rendering using ClearType

- Liquid-crystal displays (LCDs) typically use a staggered grid, where the red, green, and blue components are sampled at slightly different locations. Subpixel rendering is a technology which takes advantage of these differences to improve the rendering of text on LCD screens.
- The vast majority of color digital cameras use a Bayer filter, resulting in a regular grid of pixels where the color of each pixel depends on its position on the grid.
- A clipmap uses a hierarchical sampling pattern, where the size of the support of each pixel depends on its location within the hierarchy.
- Warped grids are used when the underlying geometry is non-planar, such as images of the earth from space.
- The use of non-uniform grids is an active research area, attempting to bypass the traditional Nyquist limit.
- Pixels on computer monitors are normally "square" (that is, have equal horizontal and vertical sampling pitch); pixels in other systems are often "rectangular" (that is, have unequal horizontal and vertical sampling pitch – oblong in shape), as are digital video formats with diverse aspect ratios, such as the anamorphic widescreen formats of the Rec. 601 digital video standard.

=== Resolution of computer monitors ===
Most modern flat-panel monitors and television sets have a fixed native resolution, determined by the physical arrangement of their display elements.

The computer produces an image at a selected display resolution, while the display maps that image to its physical pixels. On LCD, OLED, and many electronic paper displays, output at the native resolution usually produces the sharpest result; other resolutions must be scaled. A color display pixel commonly contains red, green, and blue subpixels, although their number and arrangement vary by display technology.

Most CRT monitors could display a range of input resolutions rather than one fixed pixel grid. Their phosphor patterns did not correspond exactly to the pixels in the input signal, so the concept of a single native resolution generally does not apply to them in the same way that it does to a flat-panel display.

=== Resolution of telescopes ===
The pixel scale used in astronomy is the angular distance between two objects on the sky that fall one pixel apart on the detector (CCD or infrared chip). The scale s measured in radians is the ratio of the pixel spacing p and focal length f of the preceding optics, s = p / f. (The focal length is the product of the focal ratio by the diameter of the associated lens or mirror.)

Because 1 radian equals (180/π) × 3,600 ≈ 206,265 arcseconds, the formula is commonly written as s = 206.265 p / f when p is measured in micrometers and f in millimeters, giving s in arcseconds per pixel.

=== Bits per pixel ===
The number of distinct colors that can be represented by a pixel depends on the number of bits per pixel (bpp). A 1 bpp image uses 1 bit for each pixel, so each pixel can be either on or off. Each additional bit doubles the number of colors available, so a 2 bpp image can have 4 colors, and a 3 bpp image can have 8 colors:

- 1 bpp, 2^{1} = 2 colors (monochrome)
- 2 bpp, 2^{2} = 4 colors
- 3 bpp, 2^{3} = 8 colors
- 4 bpp, 2^{4} = 16 colors
- 8 bpp, 2^{8} = 256 colors
- 16 bpp, 2^{16} = 65,536 colors ("Highcolor" )
- 24 bpp, 2^{24} = 16,777,216 colors ("Truecolor")

For color depths of 15 or more bits per pixel, the depth is normally the sum of the bits allocated to each of the red, green, and blue components. Highcolor, usually meaning 16 bpp, normally has five bits for red and blue each, and six bits for green, as the human eye is more sensitive to errors in green than in the other two primary colors. For applications involving transparency, the 16 bits may be divided into five bits each of red, green, and blue, with one bit left for transparency. A 24-bit depth allows 8 bits per component. On some systems, 32-bit depth is available: this means that each 24-bit pixel has an extra 8 bits to describe its opacity (for purposes of combining with another image).

=== Subpixels ===
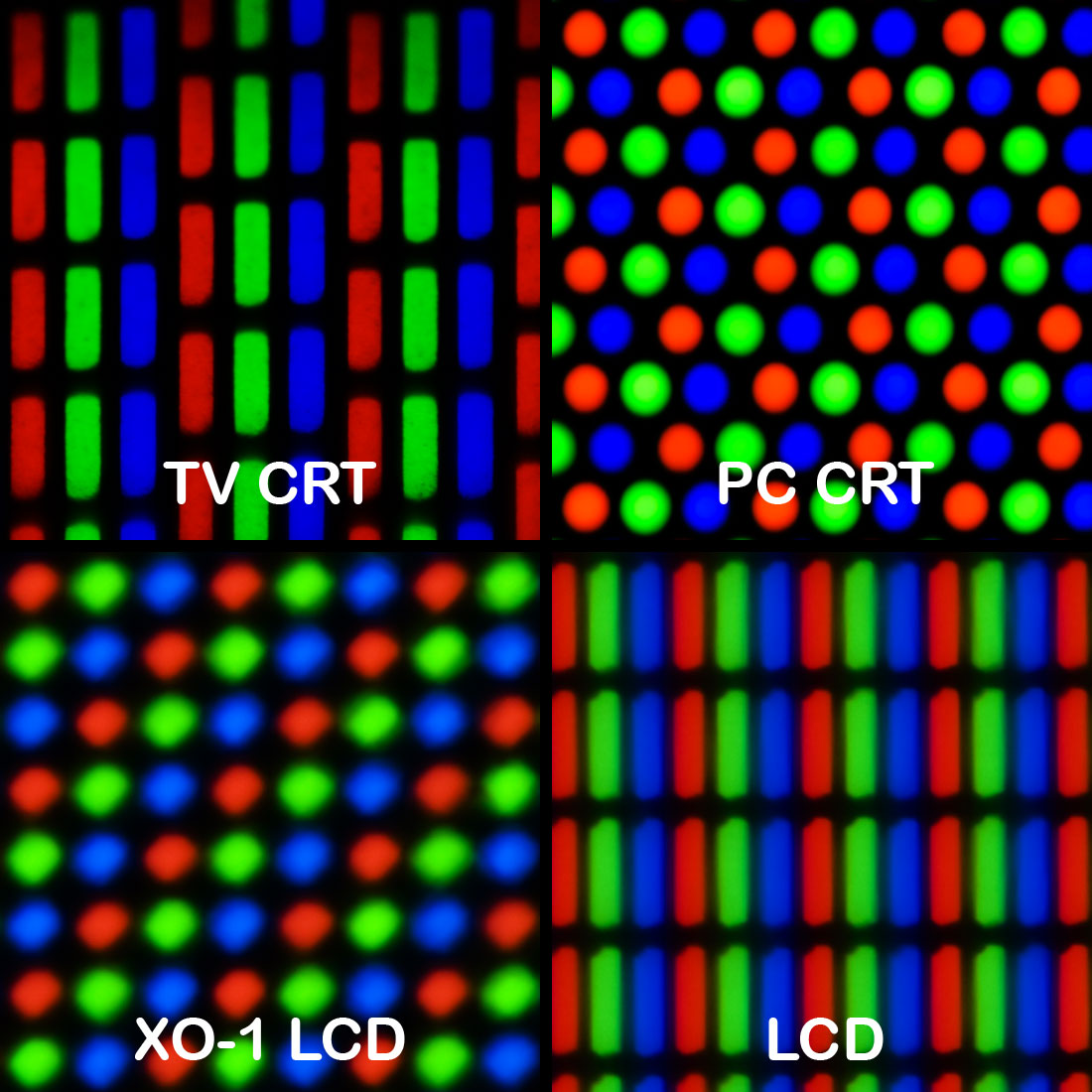
Geometry of color elements of various CRTs and LCDs

Many display and image-acquisition systems are not capable of displaying or sensing the different color channels at the same site. Therefore, the pixel grid is divided into single-color regions that contribute to the displayed or sensed color when viewed at a distance. In some displays, such as LCD, LED, and plasma displays, these single-color regions are separately addressable elements, which have come to be known as subpixels, mostly RGB colors. For example, LCDs typically divide each pixel vertically into three subpixels. When the square pixel is divided into three subpixels, each subpixel is necessarily rectangular. In display industry terminology, subpixels are often referred to as pixels, as they are the basic addressable elements in a viewpoint of hardware, and hence pixel circuits rather than subpixel circuits is used.

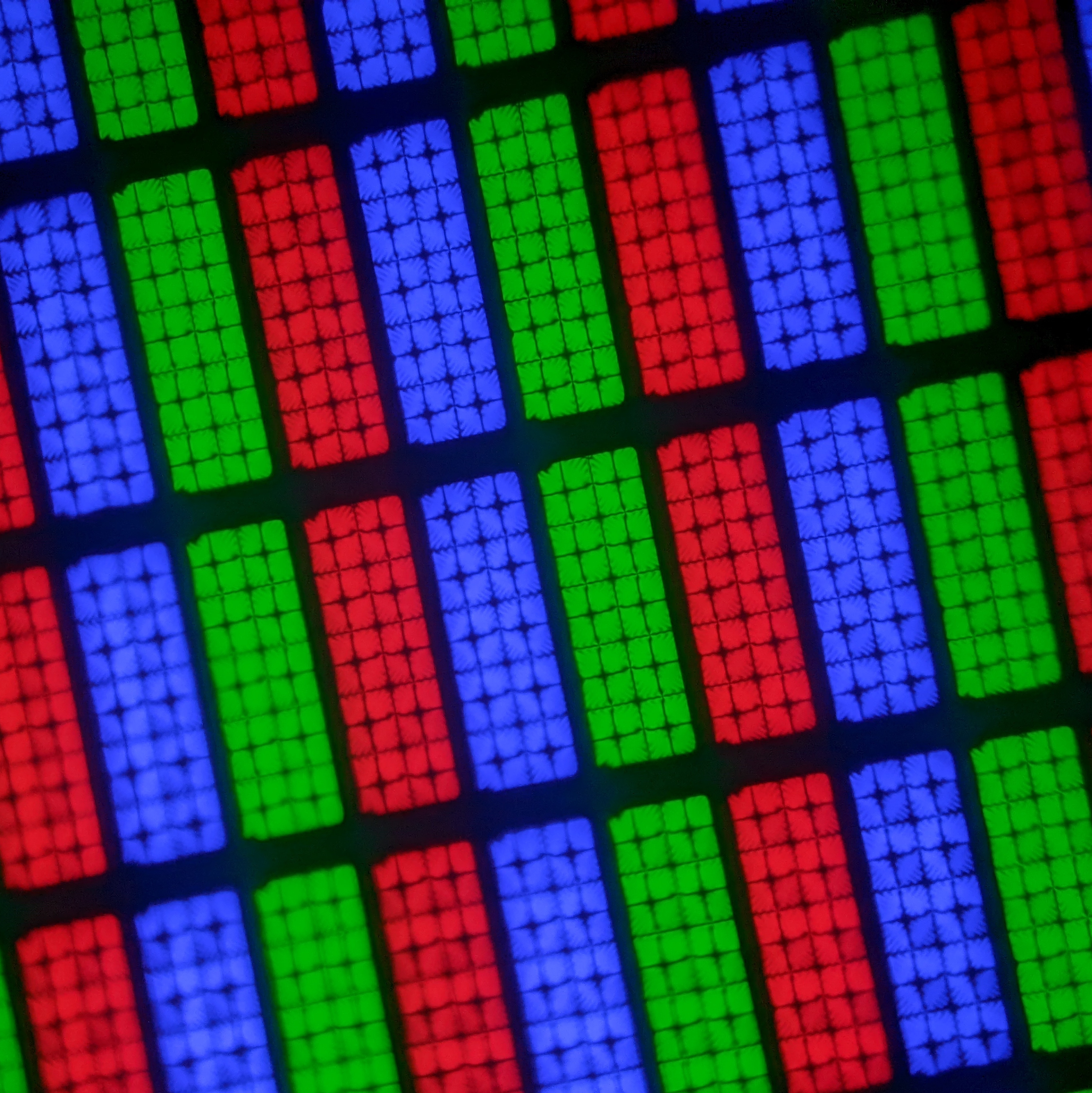
Samsung UA40M5860AKCHD TV subpixels

Most digital camera image sensors use single-color sensor regions, for example using the Bayer filter pattern, and in the camera industry these are known as pixels just like in the display industry, not subpixels.

For systems with subpixels, two different approaches can be taken:

- The subpixels can be ignored, with full-color pixels being treated as the smallest addressable imaging element; or
- The subpixels can be included in rendering calculations, which requires more analysis and processing time, but can produce apparently superior images in some cases.

This latter approach, referred to as subpixel rendering, uses knowledge of pixel geometry to manipulate the three colored subpixels separately, producing an increase in the apparent resolution of color displays. While CRT displays use red-green-blue-masked phosphor areas, dictated by a mesh grid called the shadow mask, it would require a difficult calibration step to be aligned with the displayed pixel raster, and so CRTs do not use subpixel rendering.

The concept of subpixels is related to samples.

=== Logical pixel ===
In graphic design, web design, and user interfaces, a "pixel" may mean a logical unit rather than one physical pixel on the display. This abstraction allows layouts to remain a similar apparent size across devices with different pixel densities.

In CSS, the unit px is defined relative to a reference pixel. One CSS pixel equals 1/96 of a CSS inch. The reference pixel is based on the visual angle of one pixel on a 96 dpi device viewed from an arm's length of 28 inches (710 mm), corresponding to about 0.0213 degrees and 0.26 millimetres (0.010 in) at that distance. A CSS pixel may therefore correspond to multiple physical device pixels on a high-density display.

== Megapixel ==
Diagram of common sensor resolutions of digital cameras including megapixel values

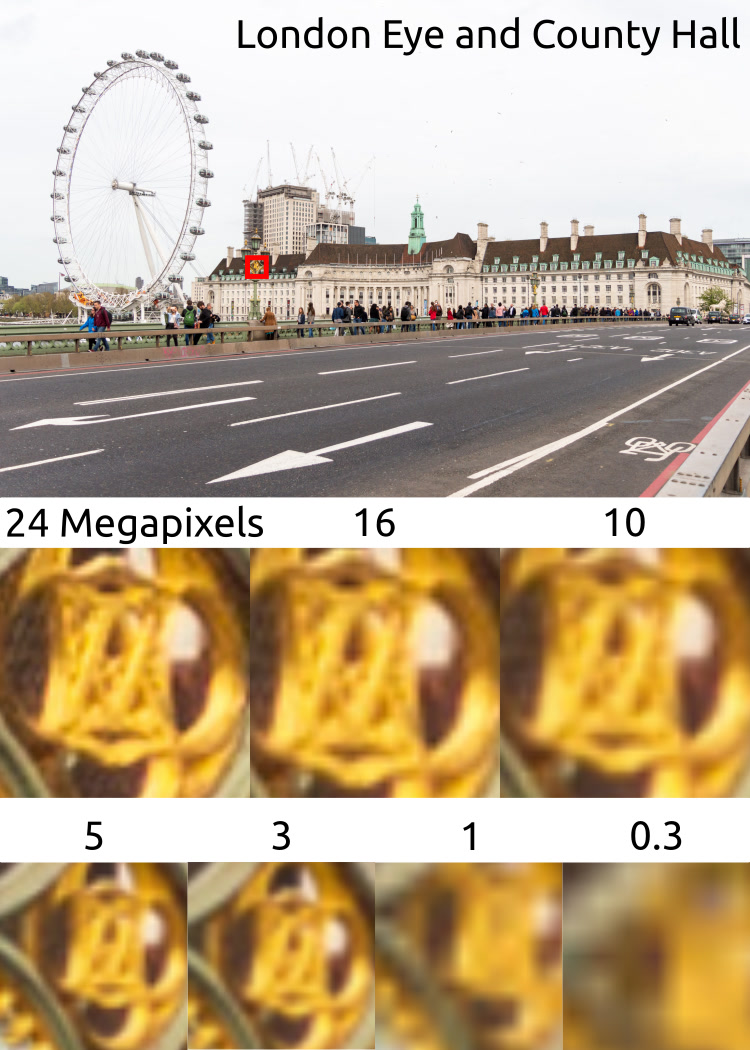
Comparison of the level of detail between 0.3 and 24 megapixels

A megapixel (MP) is one million (10^{6}) pixels. The unit is used for the number of pixels in an image, the effective photosites of a digital-camera image sensor, or the addressable elements of a digital display. For example, an image measuring 2,048 × 1,536 contains 3,145,728 pixels, or approximately 3.15 MP. Camera specifications may distinguish between total pixels on the sensor and effective pixels used to form the recorded image.

The pixel count of an image is calculated by multiplying its width by its height in pixels. This count describes the image's dimensions but does not, by itself, determine its sharpness or overall image quality.

Digital cameras generally use charge-coupled device (CCD) or complementary metal–oxide–semiconductor (CMOS) image sensors. Each photosite measures light intensity. In most color cameras, the sensor is covered by a color filter array, commonly a Bayer filter, so that each photosite measures one color component. A process called demosaicing estimates the missing color components from neighboring samples to produce full-color output pixels.

Some sensors support pixel binning, in which signals from neighboring photosites are combined and read as one output pixel. This lowers the output resolution while increasing sensitivity and can improve performance in low light. For example, a four-to-one binning mode combines the data from four photosites into one output value. Some 200 MP mobile sensors can use 4 × 4 binning, combining 16 photosites to produce a 12.5 MP output image.

A higher megapixel count can allow finer detail or more cropping, but image quality also depends on factors including sensor area, photosite size, lens resolving power, noise, dynamic range, and image processing. Sensors with the same megapixel count can therefore perform differently.

== See also ==
- Computer display standard
- Dexel
- Gigapixel image
- Image resolution
- Intrapixel and Interpixel processing
- LCD crosstalk
- PenTile matrix family
- Pixel advertising
- Pixel art
- Pixel art scaling algorithms
- Pixel aspect ratio
- Pixelation
- Pixelization
- Point (typography)
- Glossary of video terms
- Voxel
- Vector graphics
