= Deaths in March 2000 =

The following is a list of notable deaths in March 2000.

Entries for each day are listed alphabetically by surname. A typical entry lists information in the following sequence:

- Name, age, country of citizenship at birth, subsequent country of citizenship (if applicable), reason for notability, cause of death (if known), and reference.

== March 2000 ==
=== 1 ===
- Raymond Badin, 71, French Olympic gymnast (1952).
- Odell Barnes, 31, American convict, execution by lethal injection.
- Robert M. Brake, 73, American politician.
- William Colvig, 82, American musician.
- Jesper Høm, 68, Danish photographer and film director.
- Vlastimir Peričić, 72, Serbian composer.
- Lionel Salter, 85, English pianist, conductor, and writer.
- Beatrice Schenk de Regniers, 85, American writer of children's picture books.
- Sumie Tanaka, 91, Japanese screenwriter and playwright.

=== 2 ===
- John Calvin Aker, 60, American judge.
- Audun Boysen, 70, Norwegian middle distance runner and Olympic medalist (1952, 1956).
- Roger Capey, 55, New Zealand Olympic field hockey player (1968).
- Jack King, 89, Australian Olympic water polo player (1948).
- Jimmy Lewis, 81, American double bassist.
- Danny Musser, 94, American baseball player (Washington Senators).
- Jack Robinson, 79, American baseball player (Boston Red Sox).
- Sandra Schmirler, 36, Canadian curling champion and Olympian (1998), cancer.
- Charles E. Wiggins, 72, American politician and judge, member of the U.S. House of Representatives (1967-1979), cardiac arrest.

=== 3 ===
- Bimal Dasgupta, 89, Indian revolutionary.
- Ranjana Deshmukh, 45, Indian actress, heart attack.
- Paul Doguereau, 91, French pianist and piano teacher.
- Toni Ortelli, 95, Italian composer and alpinist.
- Nicole Van Goethem, 58, Belgian animator and illustrator.

=== 4 ===
- Lino Bocalan, 71, Filipino businessman and politician.
- Hermann Brück, 94, German astronomer.
- Betty Werlein Carter, 89, American publisher, editor and writer.
- Władysław Daniłowski, 97, Polish-American pianist, composer and singer.
- Kyi Kyi Htay, 75, Burmese actress.
- Geeta Mukherjee, 76, Indian politician and social worker, heart attack.
- Julian Ritter, 90, American painter.
- Donn J. Robertson, 83, United States Marine Corps officer.
- Alphons Silbermann, 90, German Jewish sociologist, musicologist, and publicist.
- Ta-You Wu, 92, Chinese theoretical physicist.
- Xie Xide, 78, Chinese physicist, breast cancer.

=== 5 ===
- Jon Barwise, 57, American mathematician, philosopher and logician, colon cancer.
- Delbert Black, 77, American sailor, heart attack.
- Lou DeFilippo, 83, American football player (New York Giants).
- Lolo Ferrari, 37, French dancer, pornographic actress, actress and singer, suicide.
- Franklin Garrett, 93, American historian.
- Bob Mahan, 96, American football player (Brooklyn Dodgers).
- Dame Roma Mitchell, 86, Australian lawyer and Governor of South Australia, bone cancer.
- Todd Thomas, 40, American gridiron football player (Kansas City Chiefs, Philadelphia Eagles), lung cancer.
- Daniel Abraham Yanofsky, 74, Canadian chess grandmaster, writer, and arbiter.
- Mikola Yermalovich, 78, Belarusian writer and historian.
- Alexander Young, 79, British operatic tenor.

=== 6 ===
- S. Arumugam, 94, Sri Lankan Tamil engineer and writer.
- Chris Balderstone, 59, English professional in cricket and football, prostate cancer.
- John Colicos, 71, Canadian actor (Star Trek, Battlestar Galactica, X-Men), heart attack.
- Jean-Pascal Curtillet, 57, French freestyle swimmer and Olympian (1960, 1964).
- Mirko Grmek, 76, Croatian and French historian of medicine, writer and scientist.
- Ole Jacob Hansen, 59, Norwegian jazz musician (drums).
- István Visy, 93, Hungarian Olympic equestrian (1936).
- Abraham Waligo, 71, Ugandan politician, Prime Minister (1985-1986).

=== 7 ===
- Bill Daniels, 79, American cable television executive.
- Darrell Floyd, 67, American college basketball player (Furman Paladins).
- Eileen Fowler, 93, English physical exercise instructor.
- Charles Gray, 71, English actor (Diamonds Are Forever, The Rocky Horror Picture Show, The Mirror Crack'd), cancer.
- W. D. Hamilton, 63, British evolutionary biologist, organ dysfunction.
- Robert Hart, 86, English gardening pioneer.
- Pee Wee King, 86, American singer-songwriter (co-wrote "Tennessee Waltz"), heart attack.
- Aleksandr Klimenko, 29, Ukrainian shot putter and Olympian (1992, 1996), shot.
- Edward H. Levi, 88, American lawyer and politician, Attorney General (1975–1977), Alzheimer's disease.
- Nelson Lincoln, 85, American sports shooter and Olympian (1960).
- Hirokazu Ninomiya, 82, Japanese football player and manager, pneumonia.
- Alimineti Madhava Reddy, 51, Indian politician, landmine explosion.
- Jack Sanford, 70, American baseball player, brain cancer.
- Kazuto Tsuruoka, 83, Japanese baseball player and manager.
- Byron M. Tunnell, 74, American politician, cancer.
- Nicolas Walter, 65, British anarchist and atheist writer, speaker and activist.
- Masami Yoshida, 41, Japanese javelin thrower and Olympian (1984, 1988, 1992), suicide.

=== 8 ===
- Edwin Cubero, 76, Costa Rican footballer, renal failure.
- Gertrude Sanford Legendre, 97, American socialite, heart attack.
- Earle Gorton Linsley, 89, American entomologist.
- Joe Mullaney, 75, American basketball player (Boston Celtics), and coach, cancer.
- Vilho Ylönen, 81, Finnish cross-country skier, rifle shooter and Olympic medalist (1952, 1956, 1960, 1964).

=== 9 ===
- Ziya Bazhayev, 39, Russian businessman, plane crash.
- Artyom Borovik, 39, Russian journalist and media magnate, plane crash.
- Robert F. Busbey, 71, American athletic director.
- Patricia Grizzaffi Campbell, 36-37, American planetary scientist.
- Jean Coulthard, 92, Canadian composer and music educator.
- Lucrecia Covelo, 80, Uruguayan entomologist, curator and film-maker
- Miguel Cruz, 89, Salvadoran football player.
- Jim Egan, 79, Canadian LGBT rights activist, lung cancer.
- Pierre Ghestem, 78, French bridge and checkers player.
- Peter Hauser, 65, British football player and manager.
- Pathanay Khan, Pakistan folk singer.
- Usha Kiran, 70, Indian actress.
- Robert Parry, 67, British politician, diabetes.
- Ivo Robić, 77, Croatian singer-songwriter.
- Booker Russell, 44, American football player (Oakland Raiders, San Diego Chargers, Philadelphia Eagles).

=== 10 ===
- Judith Barrett, 91, American film actress.
- Rafael Bash, 87, Israeli politician.
- Charlie Biot, 82, American baseball player.
- Arden Booth, 88, American politician.
- Barbara Cooney, 82, American author and illustrator.
- Ivan Hirst, 84, British Army officer and engineer.
- William Porter, 73, American track and field athlete and Olympic champion (1948).
- John Sladek, 62, American science fiction author, pulmonary fibrosis.

=== 11 ===
- Kenneth Boyle, 62, American lawyer and politician, cancer.
- Kazimierz Brandys, 83, Polish essayist and script writer.
- Knute Buttedahl, 74, Canadian expert on global education and international development.
- René Cóspito, 94, Argentine musician and actor.
- Alex Dreier, 83, American news reporter and commentator, heart failure.
- Toshihito Ishimaru, 68, Japanese Olympic boxer (1952, 1956).
- HB Jassin, 82, Indonesian literary critic and documentarian, stroke.
- Noel Mulligan, 73, Australian rugby player.
- Edgar Charles Polomé, 79, Belgian-American philologist and religious studies scholar, osteosarcoma.
- Will Roberts, 92, Welsh painter.
- Laureano López Rodó, 79, Spanish lawyer, diplomat and politician.
- Alfred Schwarzmann, 87, German Olympic gymnast (1936, 1952).

=== 12 ===
- Billy Ivison, 79, British football and rugby player.
- Aleksandar Nikolić, 75, Serbian basketball player and coach.
- Ignatius Kung Pin-Mei, 98, Chinese Catholic Bishop of Shanghai, stomach cancer.
- Mack Robinson, 85, American track and field athlete and Olympian (1936), pneumonia.

=== 13 ===
- Harry Bright, 70, American baseball player.
- Rex Everhart, 79, American actor (Beauty and the Beast, Friday the 13th, Family Business) and singer, lung cancer.
- Hamid Gada, Indian commander in the militant organisation Hizbul Mujahideen, shelling.
- Cab Kaye, 78, Ghanaian-English jazz singer and pianist.
- Paramasiva Prabhakar Kumaramangalam, 86, Indian Army general, heart attack.
- Carlo Tagnin, 67, Italian football player and manager, cancer.
- Malcolm Wilson, 86, American politician and Governor of New York.

=== 14 ===
- Kovai Chezhiyan, 68, Indian film producer and Kongu community leader.
- Tommy Collins, 69, American country musician.
- Howard James, 76, British Olympic rower (1948).
- C. Jérôme, 53, French singer, cancer.
- Paul Smith, 54, American gridiron football player (Denver Broncos, Washington Redskins), pancreatic cancer.
- Anne Wibble, 56, Swedish politician, breast cancer.
- Ponchai Wilkerson, 28, American convicted murderer, execution by lethal injection.

=== 15 ===
- Bernard Challenor, 63, American epidemiologist, heart attack.
- William J. Crawford, 81, American soldier.
- Jaime García Añoveros, 68, Spanish politician.
- Timothy Gribble, 36, American convicted murderer and suspected serial killer, execution by lethal injection.
- Clement L. Hirsch, 85, American businessman and racehorse owner, cancer.
- Tomio Hora, 93, Japanese historian and academic.
- Durward Kirby, 88, American television host and announcer, congestive heart failure.
- Zinaida Liepiņa, 92, Latvian Olympic sprinter (1928).
- Bobb McKittrick, 64, American gridiron football coach, cancer.
- Darrell Keith Rich, 45, American serial killer, execution by lethal injection.
- Rolf Römer, 64, German actor.
- Idris Abdul Wakil, 74, Zanzibari politician, President (1985-1990).
- Robert Welch, 70, English designer and silversmith.

=== 16 ===
- Morris Berthold Abram, 81, American lawyer, civil rights activist and university president.
- Ibrahim Mahmud Alfa, 53, Nigerian air marshal.
- Herta Bothe, 79, German nazi concentration camp guard during World War II and war criminal.
- Thomas Ferebee, 81, U.S. Army Air Forces bombardier aboard the Enola Gay, which dropped the atomic bomb on Hiroshima.
- Roy Henderson, 100, British opera singer.
- Carl Joiner, 75, American racing driver.
- Maja Kos, 31, Serbian Olympic synchronized swimmer (1992).
- Pavel Prudnikau, 88, Belarusian writer.
- Ivo Rinkel, 79, Dutch tennis and field hockey player.
- Stanley Ralph Ross, 64, American writer and actor, lung cancer.
- Michael Starr, 89, Canadian politician, member of the House of Commons of Canada (1952-1968).
- Phil Terranova, 80, American boxer.
- Carlos Velázquez, 51, Puerto Rican baseball player (Milwaukee Brewers).

=== 17 ===
- Harry Blum, 55, German politician.
- Jerry Bresler, 85, American conductor, songwriter and musician.
- Jack Davis, 83, Australian playwright.
- Jerry Dover, 50, American basketball player (Memphis Pros).
- Lonia Dvorin, 82, Israeli football player and coach.
- Sonny Hine, 69, American thoroughbred horse trainer.
- Charlie Holt, 77, American ice hockey coach, cancer.
- Edward F. Knipling, 90, American entomologist.
- Pete Mangum, 69, American football player (New York Giants, Denver Broncos).
- Pavel Sládek, 28, Slovak Olympic biathlete (1994).

=== 18 ===
- Tom Ah Chee, 72, New Zealand businessman, liver cancer.
- Ferenc Berko, 84, Hungarian –American photographer.
- Eberhard Bethge, 90, German Protestant theologian.
- Bob Blackman, 81, American college football coach and player.
- Pei Lisheng, 93, Chinese politician.
- Glen Mervyn, 63, Canadian rower, Olympic medalist (1960), and Olympic coach, colorectal cancer.
- Herman B Wells, 97, American academic.
- Robert Wynn, 78, American officer with Easy Company, in the 101st Airborne Division.
- Assaf Yaguri, 69, Israeli soldier and politician.

=== 19 ===
- Graham Balcombe, 93, British cave diver.
- Chris Beeby, 64, New Zealand diplomat.
- John B. Corser, American politician.
- Li Huanzhi, 81, Chinese classical composer.
- Egon Jönsson, 78, Swedish football player and Olympian (1948, 1952).
- Giovanni Linscheer, 27, Surinamese swimmer and Olympian (1992, 1996), car accident.
- Jayne Regan, 90, American film actress.
- Miroslav Strejček, 71, Czech Olympic rower (1960).
- Joanne Weaver, 64, American baseball player, amyotrophic lateral sclerosis.
- Dewey Williams, 84, American baseball player (Chicago Cubs, Cincinnati Reds).
- Mikhail Yefremov, 88, Soviet politician and diplomat.

=== 20 ===
- Johan Anthierens, 62, Belgian journalist, columnist, and writer, Hodgkin's disease.
- Zayd Mutee' Dammaj, 57, Yemeni author and politician.
- Gene Eugene, 38, Canadian actor, record producer, composer and musician.
- Michael Ferris, 68, Irish politician.
- Vivian Fine, 86, American composer, car collision.
- Jean Howard, 89, American actress and photographer.
- Ruth Kirk, 77, New Zealand anti-abortion campaigner, cancer.
- Ramon Mitra, Jr., 72, Filipino statesman, diplomat, and pro-democracy activist, liver cancer.
- Rex Rudicel, 87, American basketball player.
- Ādolfs Skulte, 90, Latvian composer and pedagogue.
- Shinzo Yamada, 86, Japanese Olympic skier (1936).

=== 21 ===
- Madge Bradley, 95, American attorney and judge.
- Rex Brandt, 85, American artist and educator.
- Johan Haanes, 87, Norwegian sportsman.
- Seumas McNally, 21, Canadian computer programmer and founder of DX Ball 2, Hodgkin's lymphoma.
- Bai Shouyi, 91, Chinese ethnologist, historian, social activist, and writer.
- Mircea Zaciu, 71, Romanian critic, literary historian and prose writer.

=== 22 ===
- John Morrison, 2nd Viscount Dunrossil, 73, British diplomat, heart attack.
- Polita Grau, 84, Cuban political prisoner, First Lady.
- Mark Lombardi, 48, American neo-conceptual artist, suicide by hanging.
- Wayne McAllister, 92, American architect, head injury.
- Carlo Parola, 78, Italian football player and coach.
- Vamüzo Phesao, 62, Naga politician, heart attack.
- Godwin Samararatne, 67, Sri Lankan meditation teacher.
- Edward Joseph Schwartz, 87, American district judge (United States District Court for the Southern District of California).

=== 23 ===
- Stig Emanuel Andersson, 85, Swedish ice hockey, football, and bandy player and Olympian (1936, 1948).
- John Andrews, 65, British cyclist.
- George Kinard, 83, American football player (Brooklyn Dodgers, New York Yankees).
- Ed McCurdy, 81, American folk singer, songwriter and actor, heart failure.
- Antony Padiyara, 79, Indian Syro Malabar prelate.
- Carl Shoup, 97, American economist and public finance expert.
- Udham Singh, 71, Indian field hockey player and Olympic champion (1952, 1956, 1960, 1964).
- Gert Willner, 59, German politician.
- Romeo B. Garrett 90, American professor

=== 24 ===
- Bles Bridges, 53, South African singer, motorcar accident.
- Henryk Dampc, 64, Polish boxer and Olympian (1960).
- Albert Duncanson, 88, Canadian Olympic ice hockey player (1932).
- Robert Hugo Dunlap, 79, United States Marine Corps major.
- Al Grey, 74, American jazz trombonist.
- George Kirby, 66, British football player.
- Kazuo Komatsubara, 56, Japanese animator, animation director and character designer, neck cancer.
- Juan Zurita, 82, Mexican lightweight boxing world champion.

=== 25 ===
- András Balogi, 58, Hungarian Olympic equestrian (1980).
- Morton A. Brody, 66, American district judge (United States District Court for the District of Maine).
- Jim Cash, 59, American film writer (Top Gun, Dick Tracy, Turner & Hooch), intestinal disorders.
- Paul Călinescu, 97, Romanian film director and screenwriter.
- Daphne Le Breton, 67, New Zealand international lawn bowler.
- Helen Martin, 90, American actress, heart attack.
- Eduardo Enrique Rodríguez, 82, Argentine football player.
- Sandy Sanford, 83, American gridiron football player (Washington Redskins), and coach.

=== 26 ===
- Alfredo Bruniera, 93, Italian prelate of the Catholic Church.
- Alex Comfort, 80, British scientist, physician and author (The Joy of Sex), cerebral haemorrhage.
- Gary Dickinson, 61, American automotive industry executive.
- Karel Thole, 85, Dutch-Italian painter and illustrator.
- Len Younce, 83, American football player (New York Giants), and coach.
- Werner Zeyer, 70, German politician.

=== 27 ===
- George Allen, 85, Canadian ice hockey player (New York Rangers, Chicago Black Hawks, Montreal Canadiens).
- Sue Wah Chin, 99, Chinese-born Australian entrepreneur.
- Ian Dury, 57, British actor and rock and roll singer (Kilburn and the High Roads, Ian Dury and the Blockheads), colorectal cancer.
- Yrjö Lehtilä, 83, Finnish Olympic shot putter (1948).
- Priya Rajvansh, 63, Indian film actress, murdered.

=== 28 ===
- Kanti Abdurakhmanov, 83-84, Soviet Chechen soldier.
- Pat Bishop, 53, Northern Irish-Australian actress, cancer.
- Milo M. Brisco, 87, American oilman, car crash.
- Bill Christiansen, 86, American politician.
- Christian Norberg-Schulz, 73, Norwegian architect and author.
- Frances Gray Patton, 94, American short story writer and novelist.
- George Petersen, 78, Australian politician.
- Anthony Powell, 94, British author.
- Grover Robinson III, 56, American real estate developer and politician, member of the Florida House of Representatives (1972–1986), helicopter crash.
- Yuri Tarasov, 39, Soviet and Ukrainian football player.
- Adam Ulam, 77, Polish-American historian and political scientist, lung cancer.

=== 29 ===
- John Baskcomb, 84, English character actor.
- Bruce Bernard, 72, English picture editor, writer and photographer, cancer.
- Yevgeny Feofanov, 62, Soviet boxer and Olympic medalist (1960).
- Hans Gustav Güterbock, 91, German-American Hittitologist and linguist.
- Hank Miklos, 89, American baseball player (Chicago Cubs).
- Shirley Palmer, 91, American (silent) film actress, fall.
- Anna Sokolow, 90, American dancer and choreographer.

=== 30 ===
- George Batchelor, 80, Australian mathematician.
- Mary Flaherty, 74, American baseball player.
- Salvador Abascal Infante, 89, Mexican politician.
- Jean E. Karl, 72, American book publisher.
- Rudolf Kirchschläger, 85, Austrian politician, President (1974-1986), cardiovascular disease.
- Beryl McBurnie, 86, Trinidadian dancer.
- Mihrimah Sultan, 77, Ottoman princess, granddaughter of Mehmed V, blood cancer.

=== 31 ===
- Hardev Bahri, 93, Indian linguist, literary critic, and lexicographer.
- Hjalmar Bergström, 93, Swedish world champion cross-country skier and Olympian (1936).
- Adrian Fisher, 47, British guitarist, myocardial infarction.
- Gisèle Freund, 91, German-French photographer and photojournalist.
