= Thomas Sutton (photographer) =

English photographer, author and inventor (c.1819–1875)

- Born: c. 1819
- Died: 19 March 1875 (aged 55–56)
- Occupations: Photographer; author; inventor

Thomas Sutton (c. 1819 – 19 March 1875, in Kensington) was an English photographer, author, and inventor.

== Life ==
Thomas Sutton went to school in Newington Butts and studied architecture for four years before studying at Caius College, Cambridge graduating in 1846 as the 29th wrangler. He opened a photographic studio in Jersey the following year under the patronage of Prince Albert. In 1855 he set up a photographic company in Jersey with business partner Louis Désiré Blanquart-Evrard that produced prints from calotype negatives. The following year, Sutton and Blanquart-Evrard founded the journal Photographic Notes, which Sutton edited for eleven years. A prolific author, Sutton wrote a number of books on the subject of photography, including the Dictionary of Photography in 1858.

In 1859, Sutton developed the earliest panoramic camera with a wide-angle lens. The lens consisted of a glass sphere filled with water, which projected an image onto a curved plate. The camera was capable of capturing an image in a 120 degree arc.

In 1861, Sutton invented and patented the first true single lens reflex camera.

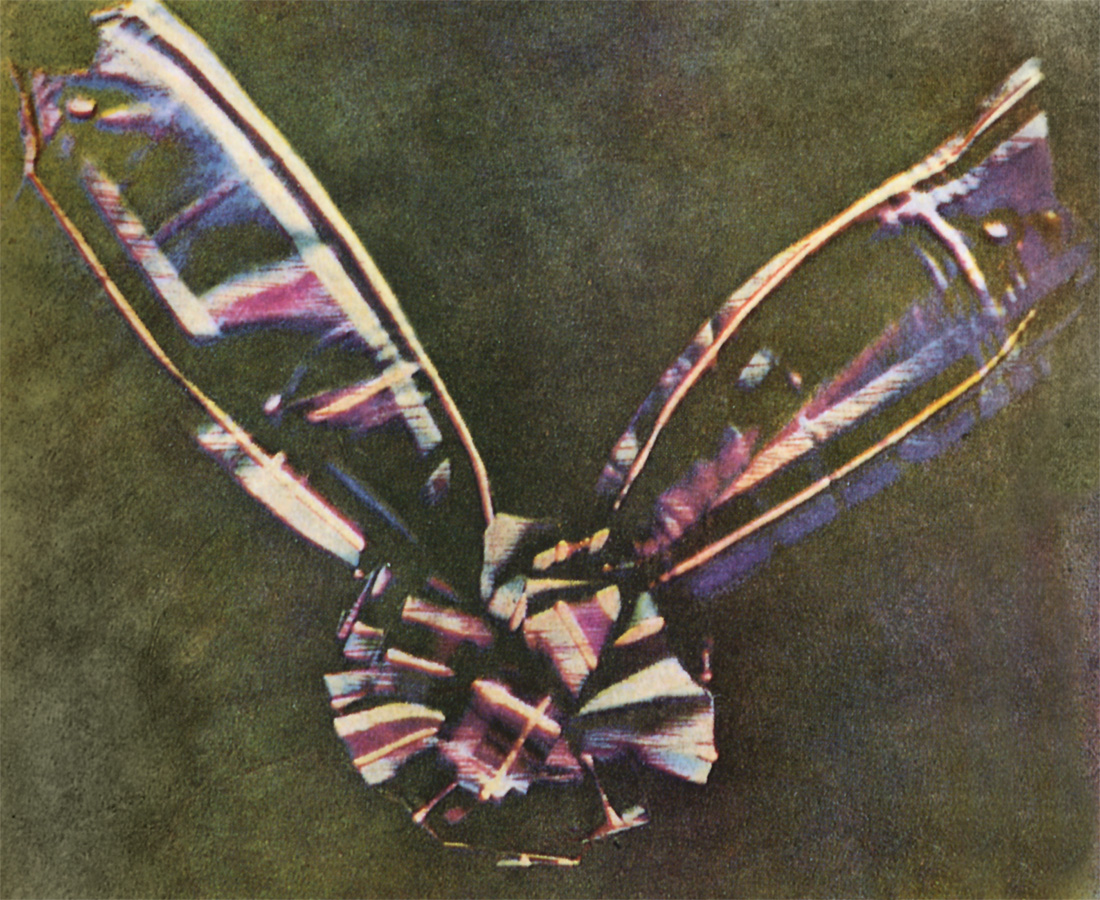
The first permanent colour photograph, taken by Sutton in 1861 using the method proposed by James Clerk Maxwell

Sutton was the photographer for James Clerk Maxwell's pioneering 1861 demonstration of colour photography. In a practical trial of a thought-experiment Maxwell had published in 1855, Sutton took three separate black-and-white photographs of a multicoloured ribbon, one through a blue filter, one through a green filter, and one through a red filter. Using three projectors equipped with similar filters, the three photographs were projected superimposed on a screen. The additive primaries variously blended to reproduce a gamut of colour. The photographic materials available to Sutton were mainly sensitive to blue light, barely sensitive to green and practically insensitive to red, so the result was only a partial success. Forty years later, adequately panchromatic plates and films had made excellent colour reproduction possible by this method, as demonstrated by the work of Sergey Prokudin-Gorsky. The principle of reproducing a full range of colour by three-colour analysis and synthesis is based on the nature of human colour vision and underlies nearly all practical chemical and electronic colour imaging technologies. Sutton's ribbon image is sometimes called the first colour photograph. There were, in fact, earlier and possibly better colour photographs made by experimenters who used a completely different, more purely chemical process, but the colours rapidly faded when exposed to light for viewing. Sutton's photographs preserved the colour information in black-and-white silver images containing no actual colouring matter, so they are very light-fast and durable and the set may reasonably be described as the first permanent colour photograph.

Sutton also worked on the development of dry photographic plates.
