= Photographic Activity Test =

Evaluation of archival materials

Photographic Activity Test (PAT) is an ISO standard test detailed in ISO 18916:2025 (E), updated in 2025. Previous versions of the standard were numbered ISO 14523:1999(E).

The test evaluates materials for archival quality and their use in photographic enclosures. Many different types of materials can be tested including: paper, boards, plastic, adhesives, pens, stickers, labels, paints and inks. The test involves incubating samples and detectors in a high-temperature, high-humidity accelerated aging environment.
