= Bernard Challenor =

American public health professional (1936–2000)

Dr. Bernard Challenor
- Born: July 24, 1936; Manhattan, New York, USA
- Died: March 15, 2000 (aged 63); Manhattan, New York, USA
- Education: Hunter College; SUNY Downstate Medical Center (MD); Harvard University (MPH)
- Occupation: Epidemiologist
- Years active: 1961–2000
- Employer(s): World Health Organization; United States Public Health Service; Centers for Disease Control and Prevention; Boston Department of Health and Hospitals; Columbia University
- Organization: Physicians Forum

Bernard Desmond Challenor (July 24, 1936 – March 15, 2000) was a public health professional and professor at the Mailman School of Public Health at Columbia University.

== Education and career ==
He completed his bachelor's degree at Hunter College and received his medical degree from the State University of New York-Downstate Medical Center in 1961. In addition, he earned a master of public health from Harvard University. Dr. Challenor worked at major public health entities throughout the 1960s, including the World Health Organization and the United States Public Health Service, serving in parts of Asia, Latin America, and West Africa. He was in the 1965 class of the United States Center for Disease Control and Prevention's elite Epidemic Intelligence Service. His international work included efforts to vaccinate for and eradicate smallpox. Following this, he worked for the Boston Department of Health and Hospitals.

Dr. Challenor led the partnership between Columbia University and Harlem Hospital Center, becoming deputy director of the Columbia University-Harlem Hospital Center Affiliation in 1969. As chairman elect and chairman of the Physicians Forum in the early 1970s, he advocated for the restructuring of the United States healthcare system and a national health insurance system. While at Columbia, he was the director of the general public health program and from 1978-1980, was acting dean of the Columbia Mailman School of Public Health. By 1985, he was an associate professor in the school and continued in his role as director of public health, partnering with the Columbia School of International and Public Affairs to offer a dual degree to students.

== Death ==
Dr. Challenor died of a heart attack in his Manhattan home.

== Recognition ==
The Columbia Mailman School of Public Health awards the "Bernard Challenor Spirit Prize" to students able to build community across departments in the school.
