= Mary Lynn Ritzenthaler =

American archivist

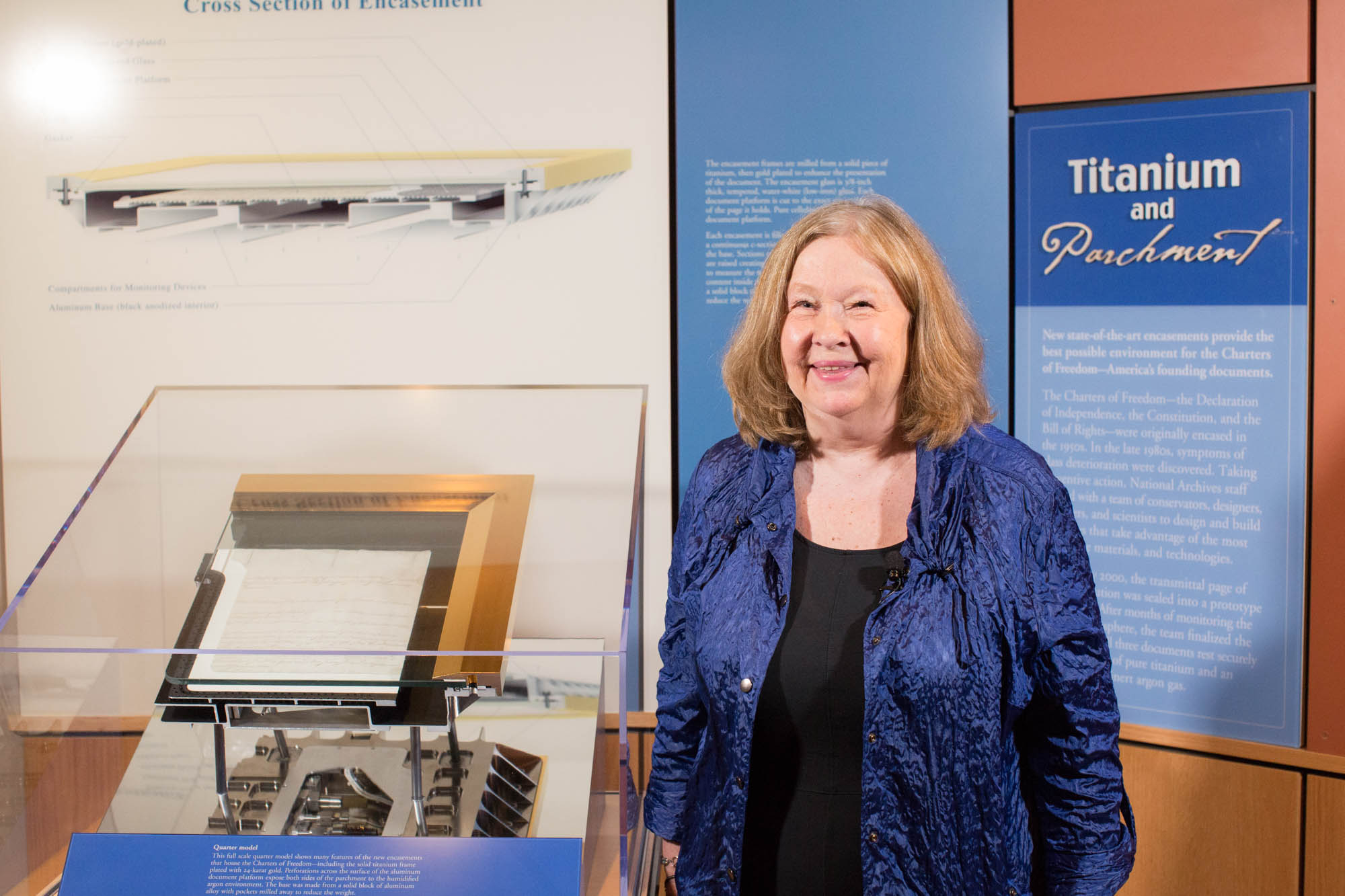
- Ritzenthaler in 2016
- Education: Wayne State University (BS, MLS)
- Occupation: Archivist
- Employer(s): National Archives and Records Administration
- Known for: Chief of the Conservation Laboratory at NARA; conservation of the Charters of Freedom

Mary Lynn Ritzenthaler is an American archivist who has served as the Chief of the Conservation Laboratory at the National Archives and Records Administration (NARA) since 1985.

== Education ==
Ritzenthaler received her undergraduate degree in English from Wayne State University. She also attended Wayne State for her Master's in Library Science, with a concentration in archives administration.

== Career ==
Ritzenthaler has served as the Chief of the Conservation Laboratory at the National Archives and Records Administration (NARA) since 1985. She worked for the Society of American Archivists (SAA) and the University of Illinois-Chicago. She has written extensively, as well as lectured throughout the United States, on archives preservation. Many of her lectures focused on techniques to preserve family photos, recipes, books and other papers. Her most well-known works are Preserving Archives and Manuscripts and Photographs: Archival Care and Management, both of which were published through the Society of American Archivists. From 1999-2003, Ritzenthaler led the conservation team that treated and re-encased the Charters of Freedom (the Declaration of Independence, the Constitution, and the Bill of Rights). She was the last person to touch the Declaration of Independence before it was re-cased. She retired from the National Archives in 2016 after serving over 30 years in archives preservation and conservation.

== Publications ==
- Preserving Archives and Manuscripts (2010)
- Photographs : Archival Care and Management (2006)
- Archives and Manuscripts : Administration of Photo Collections (1984)
- Archives and Manuscripts : Conservation (1983)
