= Romeo B. Garrett =

American sociology professor (1910–2000)

- Born: February 2, 1910; Natchez, Adams County, Mississippi, US
- Died: March 23, 2000 (aged 90); East Peoria, Tazewell County, Illinois, US
- Spouse: Naomi Sanders Garrett

Romeo Benjamin Garrett (February 2, 1910 – March 23, 2000) was a professor of sociology at Bradley University. He was the first black faculty member to be hired by the university.

The Romeo B. Garrett Cultural Center at Bradley University was dedicated in 1980. In 1963, the university also established a scholarship named after him. The city of Peoria renamed Fifth Street, where he lived, to Romeo B. Garrett Avenue.

== Early life and education ==
Dr. Garrett was born in Natchez, Mississippi, on February 2, 1910.The son of Charles Edward and Pinkie Duncan Garrett. He also was the brother of Lenard Garrett of Seattle, Washington, and Cleveland Garrett of New Orleans, Louisiana. He received his bachelor's degree from Straight University before moving to Peoria, Illinois, to attend Bradley University, where he obtained his master's degree. New York University granted his doctorate in 1963 for his dissertation, Social aspects of the aging process among a selected older population in Peoria, Illinois.

== Career ==
In 1936, Dr. Garrett worked as the supervisor of 210 teachers in the Works Progress Administration, focusing on literacy in New Orleans and Louisiana.

In 1942, during World War II, Dr. Garrett enlisted in the Army and was stationed at Victorville Army Flying School in Victorville, California. In 1945, he received from the Army Air Forces recognition for meritorious service.

Dr. Garrett was offered a faculty position at Bradley University after completing his master's degree, and was the first black faculty member at the institution. He remained the only black faculty member for the following 22 years.

1947 Dr. Garrett taught a course in Sociology called Race Relations. In 1969, within Bradley's Department of Sociology he served as "Chairman of the Faculty" and again in 1970 as "Chairman". As a long-time faculty member, he went on to win the Mergen Award for Community Service in 1974. In 1964, Dr. Garrett was honored with a scholarship program in his name, given to five gifted students from area high schools: The Romeo B. Garrett Scholarship. That scholarship program had by 1995 funded over 400 Bradley students.

Additionally, Bradley University offers the Romeo B. Garrett Intercultural Leadership Award annually to students who demonstrate leadership by positively impacting the University through promotion of diversity and intercultural understanding.

Many of Dr. Garrett's sermons were published in The Traveler Weekly.

Dr. Garrett's The Negro in Peoria documented the history of Blacks locally.

== Personal life ==
He was the husband of Naomi Sanders Garrett. He was also involved with the city of Peoria in a fight to keep his house from being taken under condemnation rights. He eventually won. His house is still standing as a testament to his own determination and tenacity.

Served as Vice-President of NAACP, Peoria chapter. He was also an associate pastor of Zion Baptist Church for 40 years.

== Death and legacy ==
Pamela Burnside class of 1990, was the first winner of the Dr. Romeo B. Garrett Award for Scholarship and the Enhancement of Human Rights.

Garrett died at Rosewood Care Center in East Peoria, Illinois, on March 23, 2000, at the age of 90. He is buried next to his wife at Springdale Cemetery in Peoria, Illinois.

== Works ==
- Our Heritage from the American Indians, Journal of the Illinois State Archaeological Society, Vol. 4, No. 1, January 1954
- The Negro in Peoria, 1773–1905, Negro History Bulletin, Vol. 17, No. 7, April 1954
- African Survivals in American Cultures, Journal of Negro History, 51(4), 1966.
- Famous First Facts about Negroes (1972) Arno Press, New York
- The Negro in Peoria (1973) – dissertation expanded and published as book
- The Bible and the Negro, Negro History Bulletin, Vol. 36, No. 4, April 1973.
- Illinois Commentary: The Role of the Duryea Brothers in the Development of the Gasoline Automobile, Journal of the Illinois State Historical Society (1908–1984), Vol. 68, No. 2, April 1975.
- The Presidents and the Negro (1976) & The Presidents and the Negro (1982)
- Imhotep – Father of Medicine, Negro History Bulletin, Vol. 41, No. 5, September–October 1978.
