= Ferenc Berko =

Hungarian photographer

Ferenc Berkó
- Born: January 28, 1916; Nagyvarad, Hungary
- Died: March 18, 2000 (aged 84); Aspen, Colorado

Ferenc Berkó (January 28, 1916 – March 18, 2000) was a Hungarian –American photographer noted for his early use of color film.

== Early life ==
Berkó was born in Nagyvarad, Hungary. His father died while Berkó was young, and he was sent to live with family friends in Germany. The family friends were in turn friends of leading Bauhaus figures, including Walter Gropious, who had an early influence on Berkó. He left Germany with just as the Nazis came to power, moving to a succession of cities including Frankfurt, Dresden, Berlin, Morocco, and Mexico.

== Career ==
Between 1933 and 1947, he lived in London, Paris and Bombay, during which time he established a name for himself as a filmmaker and photographer. He earned most of his living as taking photographic portraits, and also published his photographs in the magazines Lilliput, Minicam, U.S. Camera, and Popular Photography. In 1947 László Moholy-Nagy invited Berko to come to the United States, to teach photography at the Chicago School of Design. Two years later, he took a job as a corporate photographer in Aspen, Colorado, offered by Walter Paepcke, who was then the president of the Container Corporation of America. He would remain for 50 years.

In Aspen he was a fixture of the local community, called upon regularly to document events. The year that he moved to Aspen, 1949, the city held a Goethe festival that attracted luminaries of the literature and culture world. Berkó's color photographs of famous individuals at the event, including the pianist Arthur Rubenstein, social philosopher Albert Schweitzer and playwright Thornton Wilder, were picked up internationally by magazines such as Look and Life, further contributing to his celebrity.

In 2021 the Musée de l'Elysée in Lausanne has presented a 70-year retrospective of his work titled Ferenc Berko: Fascination with the Ordinary.

== Collections ==
- Museum of Fine Arts Houston
- Museum of Modern Art, New York
- Whitney Museum of American Art
- International Center of Photography
- Musée de l'Elysée, Paris
- Harry Ransom Center
- Hood Museum
