= List of Pentax products =

The following is a partial list of products manufactured under the Pentax brand. Examples of Pentax products include digital cameras and binoculars.

== Film cameras ==
=== 35 mm SLR cameras ===
==== M37 screw mount ====
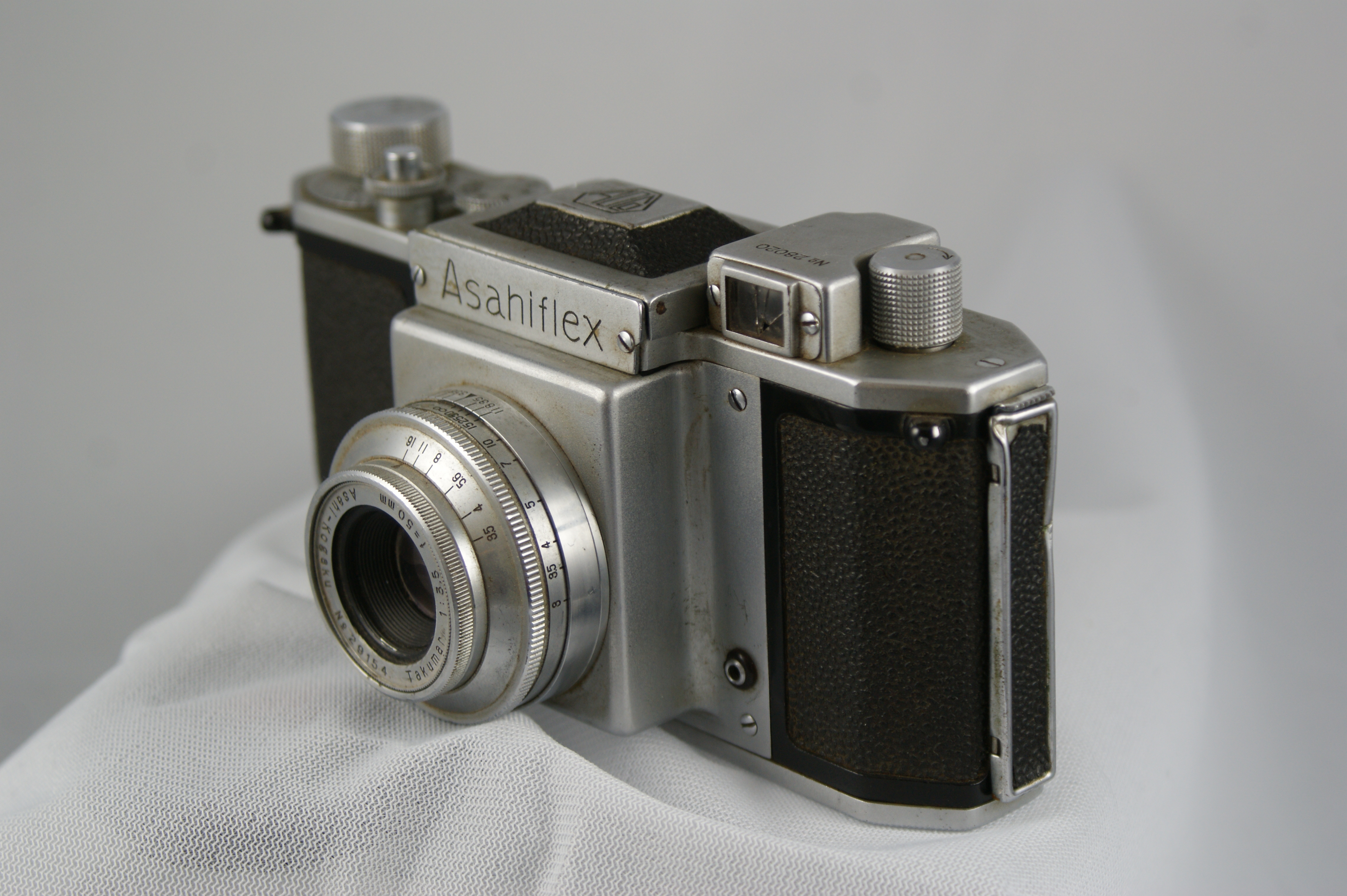
Asahiflex I with viewfinder closed

Cameras using the M37 lens mount.

- Ashiflex I (1952–1953)
- Asahiflex Ia (1953–1954) — also sold as the Tower 23
- Asahiflex IIb (1954–1957) — also sold as the Tower 23
- Asahiflex IIa (1955–1957) — also sold as the Tower 22 and Tower 24

==== M42 screw mount ====
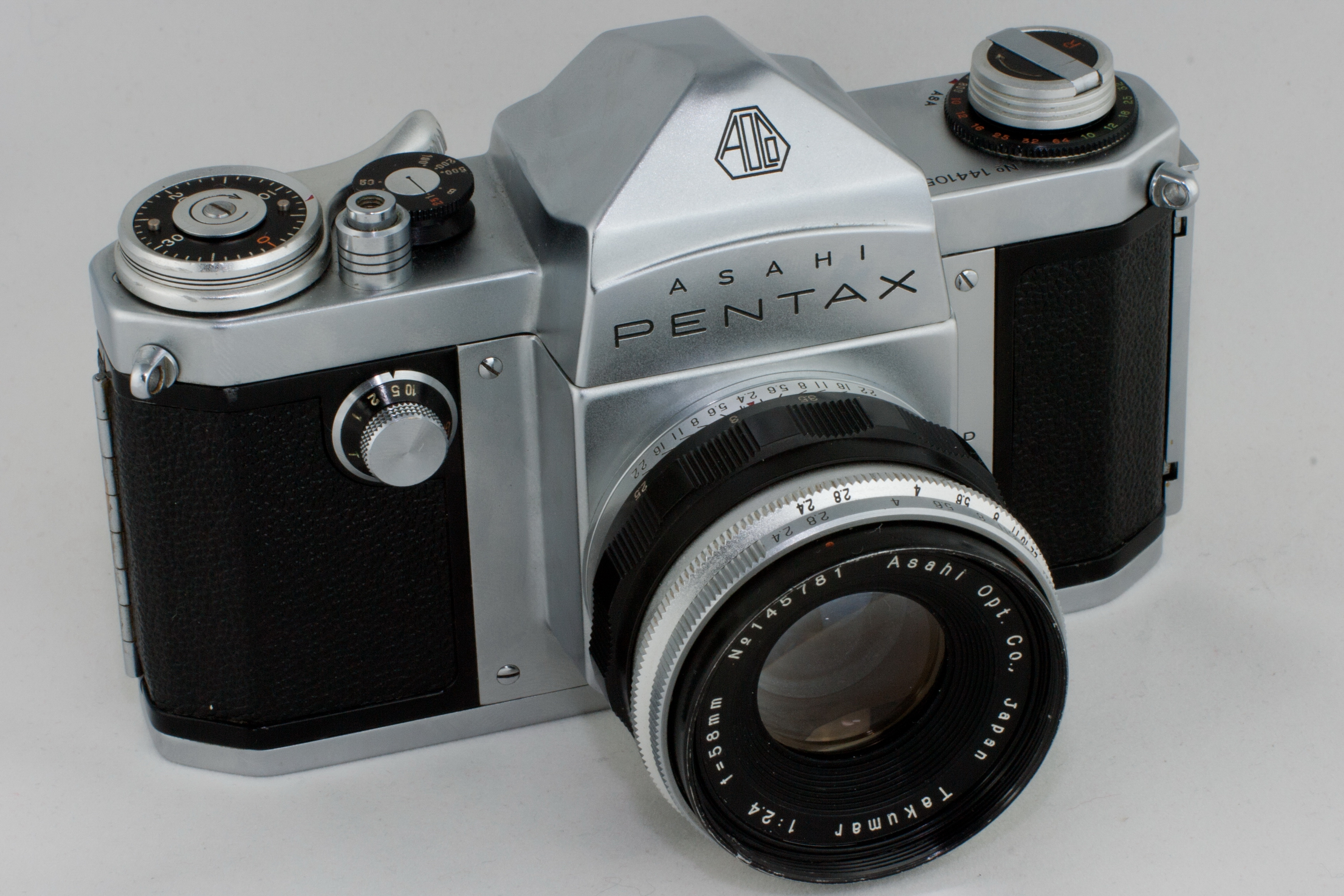
Asahi Pentax

Cameras using the M42 lens mount, also known as the Pentax screw mount.

- Asahi Pentax (1957) — also sold as the Tower 26
- Asahi Pentax S (1958) — also sold as the Tower 26
- Asahi Pentax K (1958) — also sold as the Tower 29
- Asahi Pentax S2/H2 (1959) — also sold as the Honeywell Pentax H2/Honeywell Heiland Pentax H2
- Asahi Pentax S3/H3 (1960) — also sold as the Honeywell Pentax H3/Honeywell Heiland Pentax H3
- Asahi Pentax S1/H1 (1961) — also sold as the Honeywell Pentax H1/Honeywell Heiland Pentax H1
- Asahi Pentax SV/H3v (1963) — also sold as the Honeywell Pentax H3v
- Asahi Pentax S1a/H1a (1963) — also sold as the Honeywell Pentax H1a/Honeywell Heiland Pentax H1a
- Pentax Spotmatic (1964) — also sold as Honeywell Pentax Spotmatic
- Asahi Pentax Spotmatic SL (1968) — also sold as the Honeywell Pentax Spotmatic SL]
- Asahi Pentax Spotmatic SP500 (1971) — also sold as the Honeywell Pentax Spotmatic SP500
- Asahi Pentax Spotmatic II (1971)
- Honeywell Pentax Spotmatic IIa (1971) — USA only
- Asahi Pentax Spotmatic Electro-Spotmatic (1971) — limited release Japan only
- Asahi Pentax Spotmatic ES (1971) — also sold as the Honeywell Pentax Spotmatic ES
- Asahi Pentax Spotmatic SP1000 (1973) — also sold as the Honeywell Pentax Spotmatic SP1000
- Asahi Pentax Spotmatic F (1973) — also sold as Honeywell Pentax Spotmatic F
- Asahi Pentax Spotmatic ES 2 (1973) — also sold as the Honeywell Pentax Spotmatic ES 2

==== Pentax K mount ====
Cameras using the Pentax K lens mount.

===== K series =====
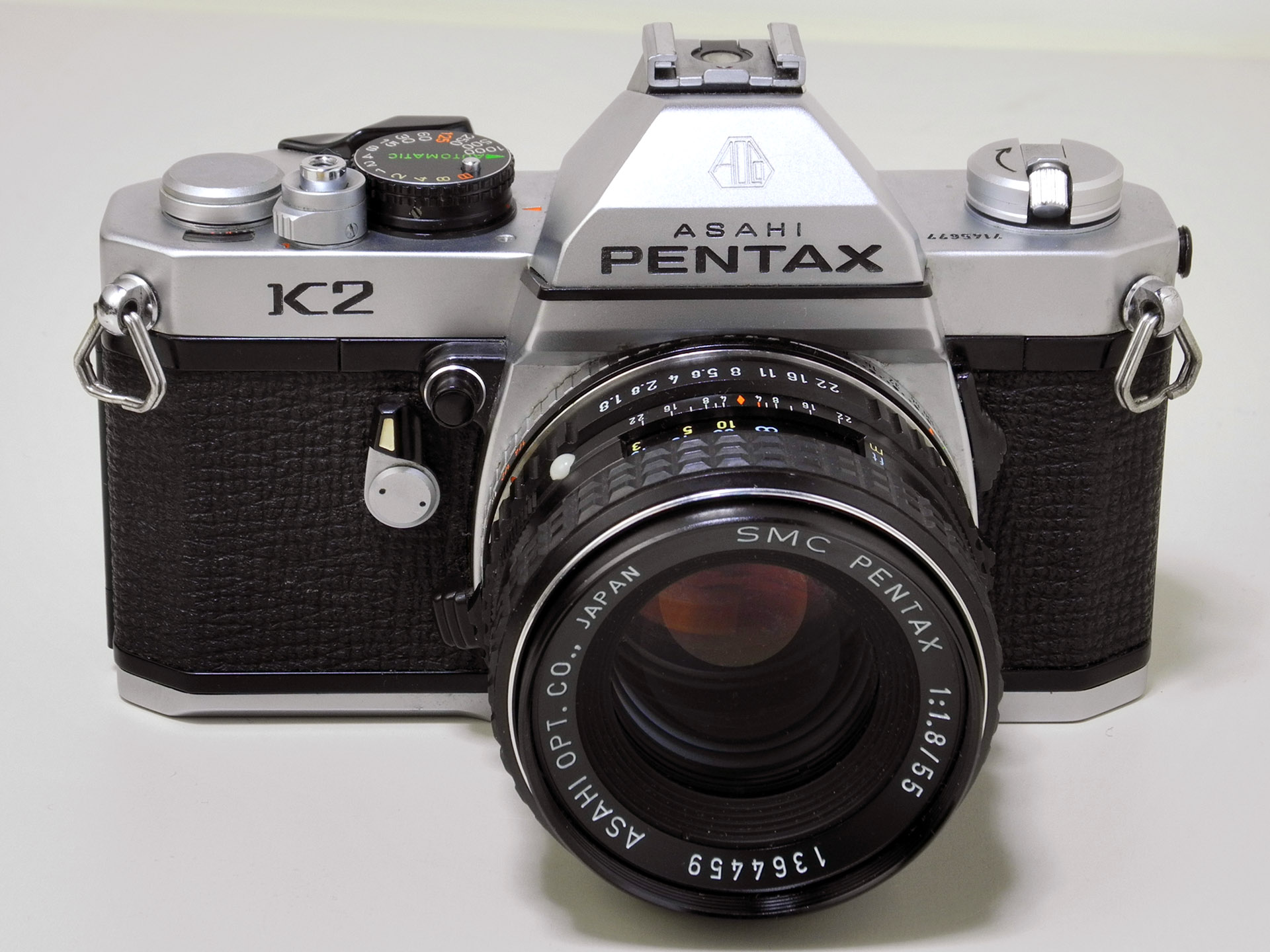
Pentax K2 with 55 mm lens

- Pentax K2 (1975–1980)
- Pentax KX (1975–1977)
- Pentax KM (1975–1977)
- Pentax K1000/1 (1975–1978)
- Pentax K2DMD (1976–1980)

===== M series =====
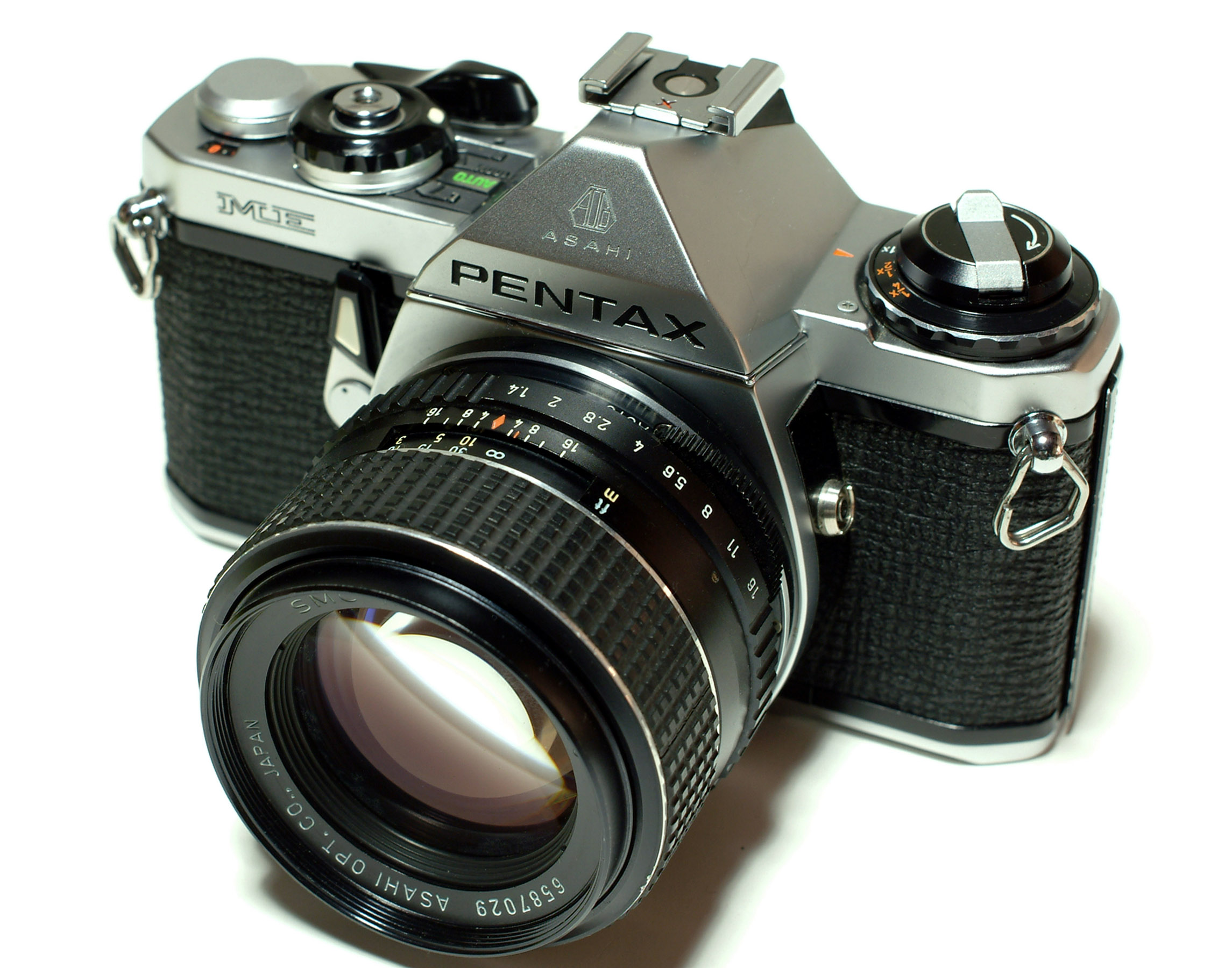
Pentax ME with 50 mm lens

- Pentax ME (1976–1980)
- Pentax MX (1976–1985)
- Pentax K1000/2 (1978–1995)
- Pentax MV (1979–1981)
- Pentax MV 1 (1979–1981)
- Pentax ME Super (1980–1987)
- Pentax ME F (1981–1988)
- Pentax MG (1982–1985)

===== L series =====
- Pentax LX (1980–2001)

===== A series =====
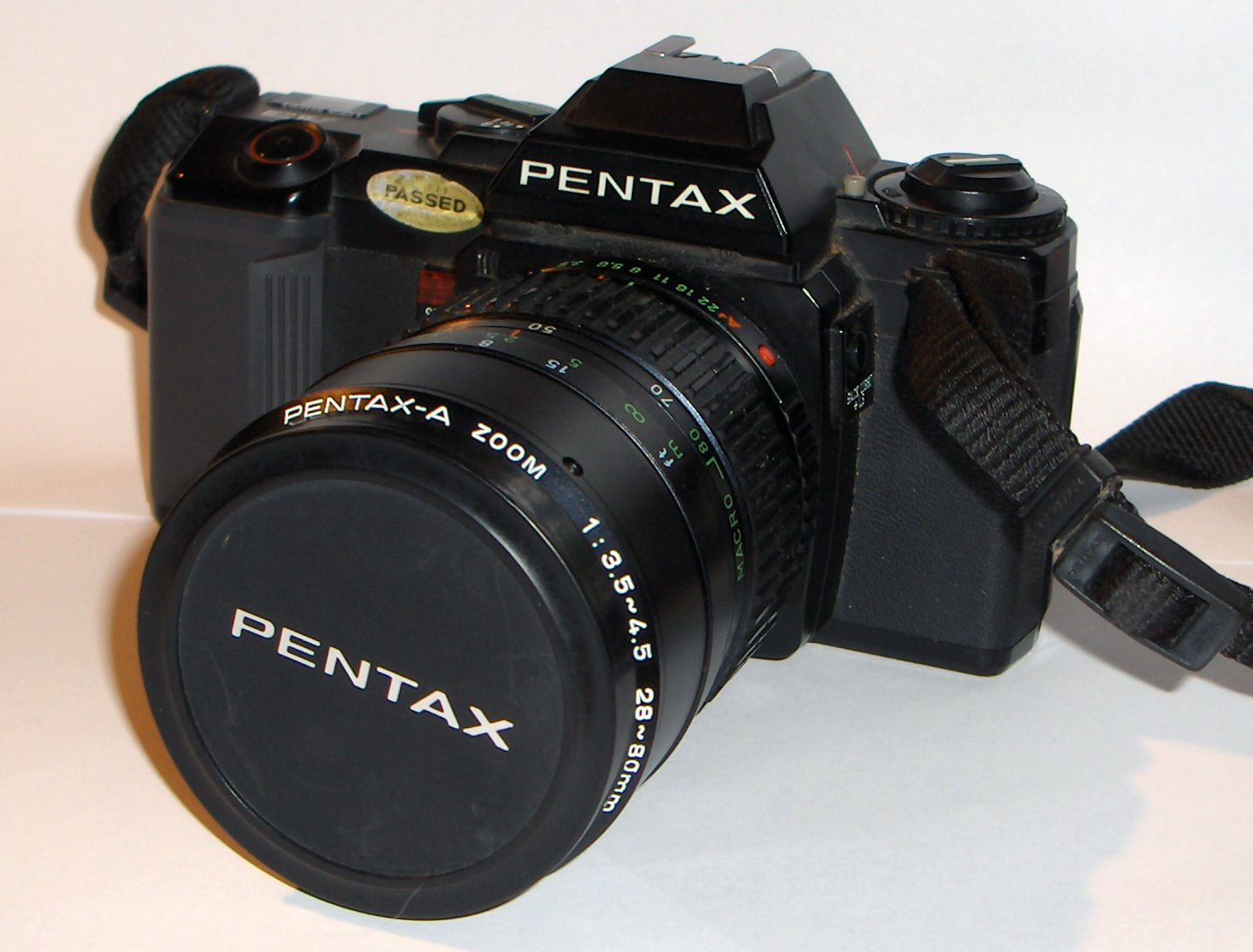
Pentax A3 with zoom lens

- Pentax A3 (1985–1987)
- Pentax A3000 (1985–1987)
- Pentax Program A/Program Plus (1984–1988)
- Pentax Super A/Super Program (1983–1987)

===== P series =====
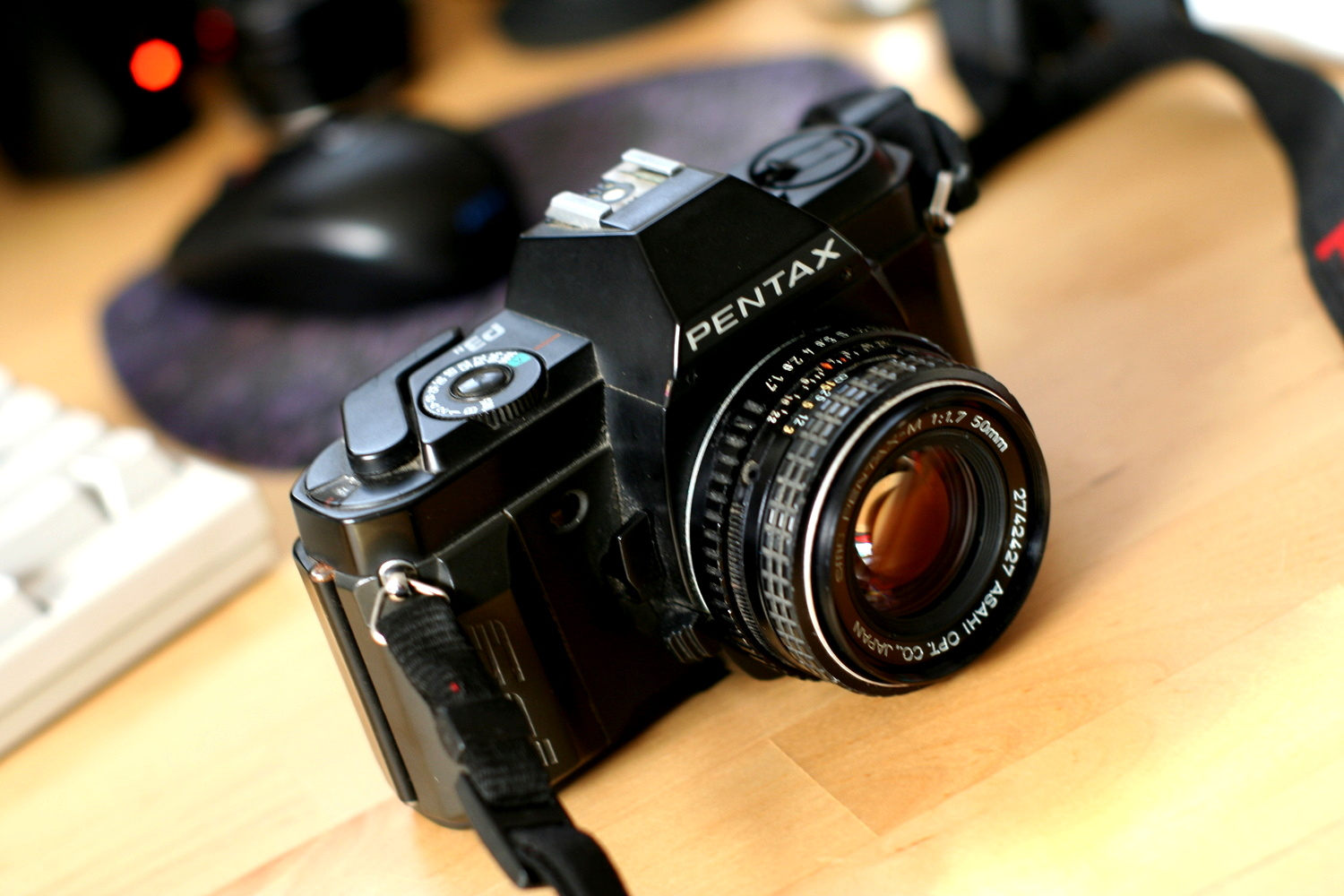
Pentax P3n with 50 mm lens

- Pentax P3 (1985–1988) — Program and manual; flash bulb; tripod ready; shutter speeds of 1-1000
- Pentax P30 (1985–1988)
- Pentax P5 (1986–1989)
- Pentax P50 (1986–1989)
- Pentax P3n (1988–1990)
- Pentax P30n (1988–1990)
- Pentax P30T (1990–1997)

===== SF series =====
- Pentax SFX/SF1 (1987–1989)
- Pentax SF7/SF10 (1988–1993)
- Pentax SFXn/SF1n (1989–1993)

===== Z/PZ series =====
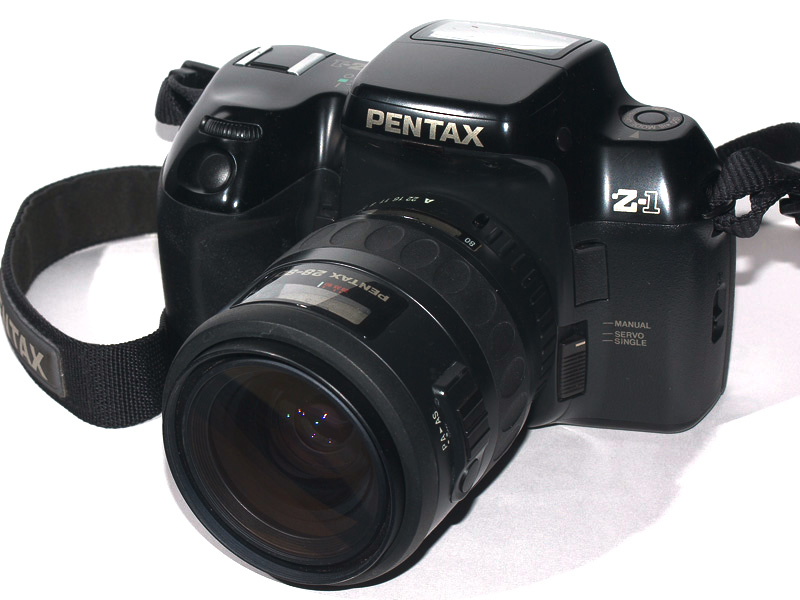
Pentax Z-1

- Pentax PZ-1/Z-1 (1991)
- Pentax PZ-10/Z-10 (1991)
- Pentax PZ-20/Z-20 (1992)
- Pentax Z-50p (1993)
- Pentax Z-5 (1994)
- Pentax Z-5p (1995)
- Pentax PZ-1p/Z-1p (1995)
- Pentax PZ-70/Z-70 (1995)

===== MZ/ZX series =====
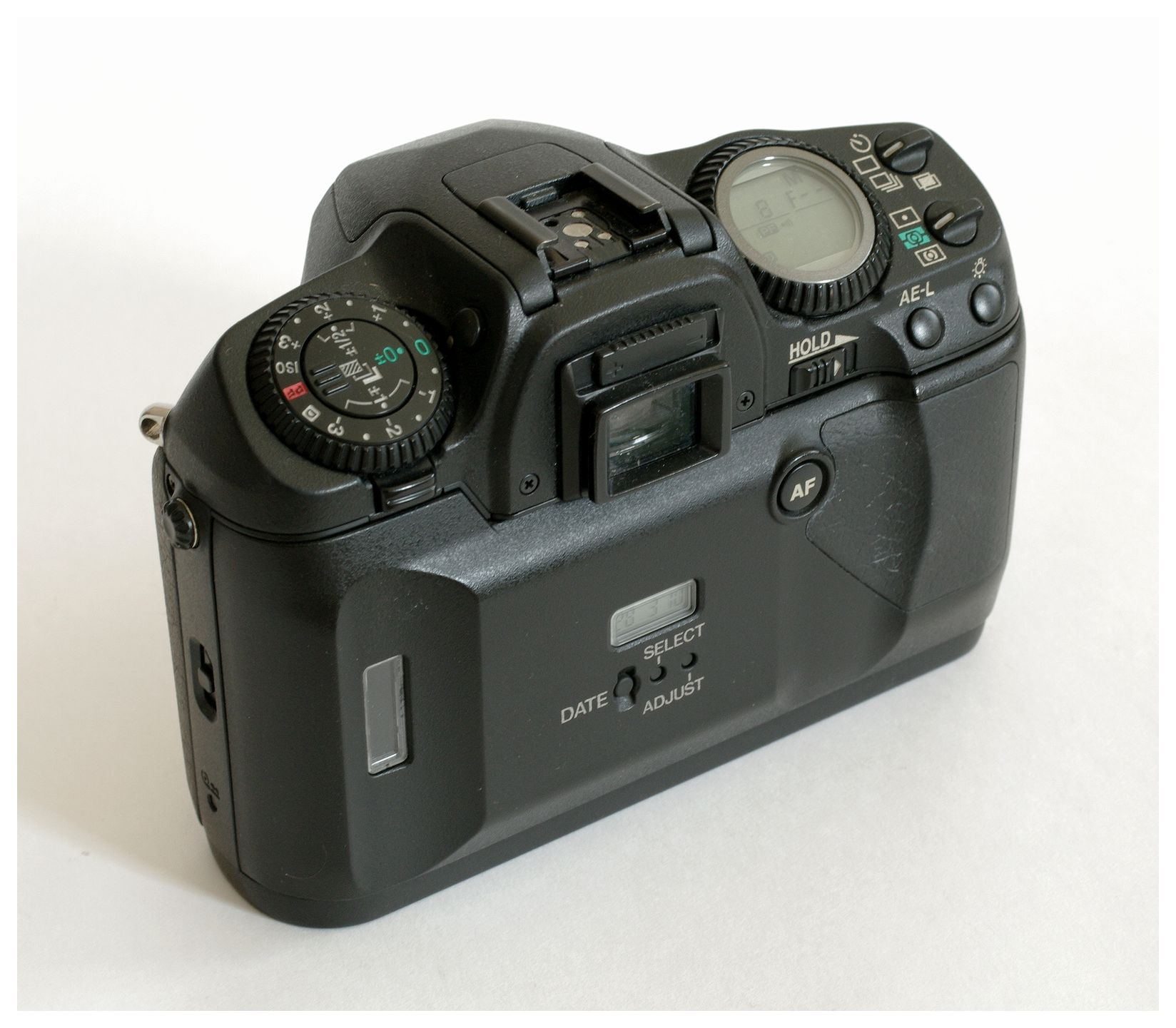
Rear of Pentax MZ-S

- Pentax MZ-5/ZX-5 (1996)
- Pentax MZ-10/ZX-10 (1996)
- Pentax MZ-3 (1997)
- Pentax MZ-5n/ZX-5n (1997)
- Pentax MZ-50/ZX-50 (1998)
- Pentax MZ-M/ZX-M (1998)
- Pentax MZ-7/ZX-7 (1999)
- Pentax MZ-30/ZX-30 (2000)
- Pentax MZ-S (2001-2006)
- Pentax MZ-6/ZX-L (2001)
- Pentax MZ-60/ZX-60 (2002)

===== *ist series =====
- Pentax *ist (2003–2006)

=== 35 mm compact cameras ===
==== Pentax Espio ====
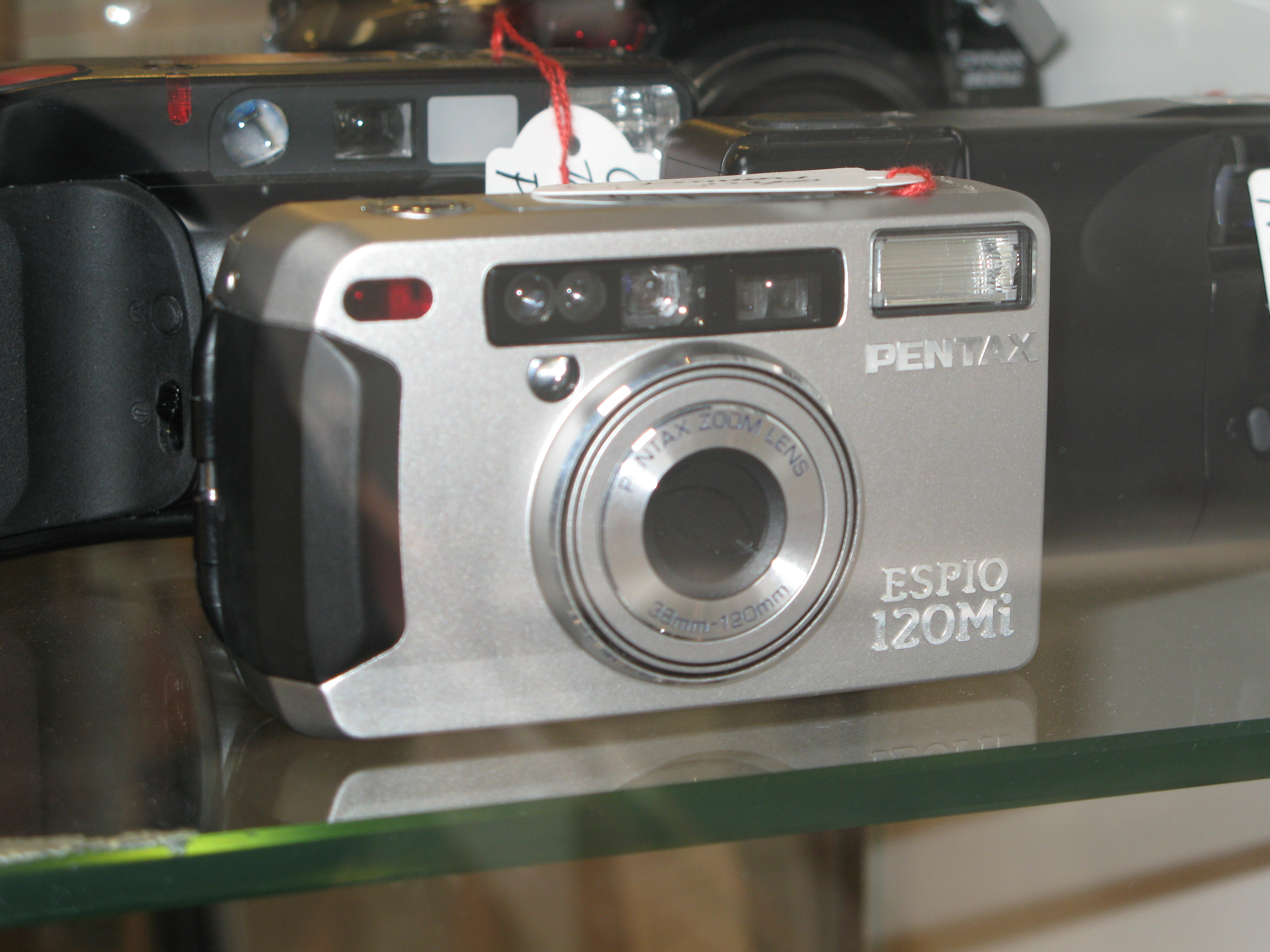
Pentax IQ-Zoom/Espio 120Mi

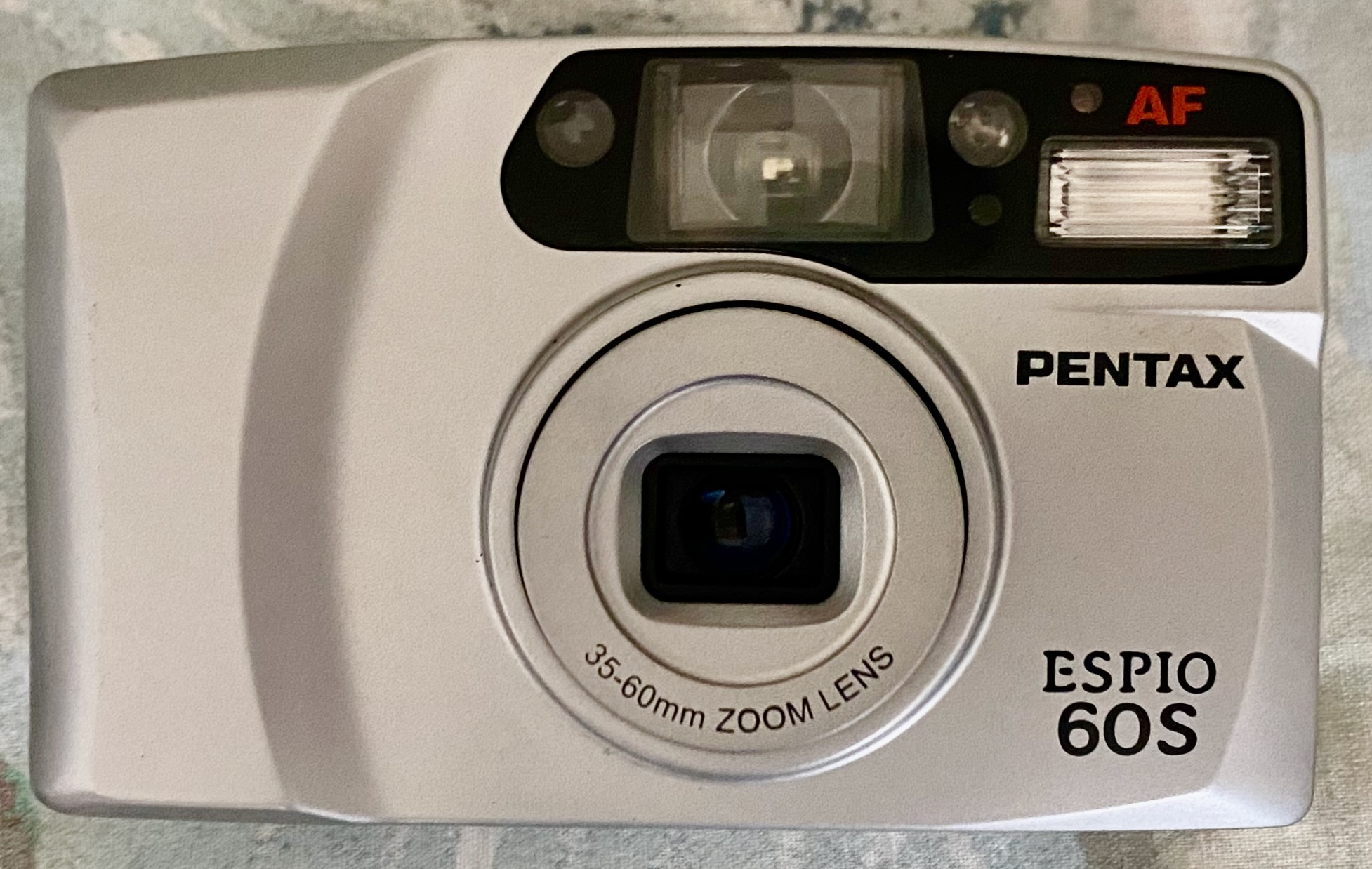
Espio 60S

These cameras are known as IQ-Zoom in the North American market. Model numbers and specifications are the same in several cases. The Espio was introduced in 1992.

- Espio 24EW
- Espio 60S/60V
- Espio 70/70E
- Espio 80/80E
- Espio 90MC
- Espio 95S
- Espio 105G/105Mi/105S/105SW/105WR
- Espio 110
- Espio 115/115G/115M
- Espio 120SW/120SW II
- Espio 130M
- Espio 135M
- Espio 140/140M/140V
- Espio 145M Super
- Espio 150SL
- Espio 160
- Espio 170SL
- Espio 200
- Espio 628
- Espio 738/738G/738S
- Espio 838/838G/838S
- Espio 928/928M
- Espio Junior
- Espio Mini
- Espio P
- Espio W

==== Pentax IQ-Zoom ====
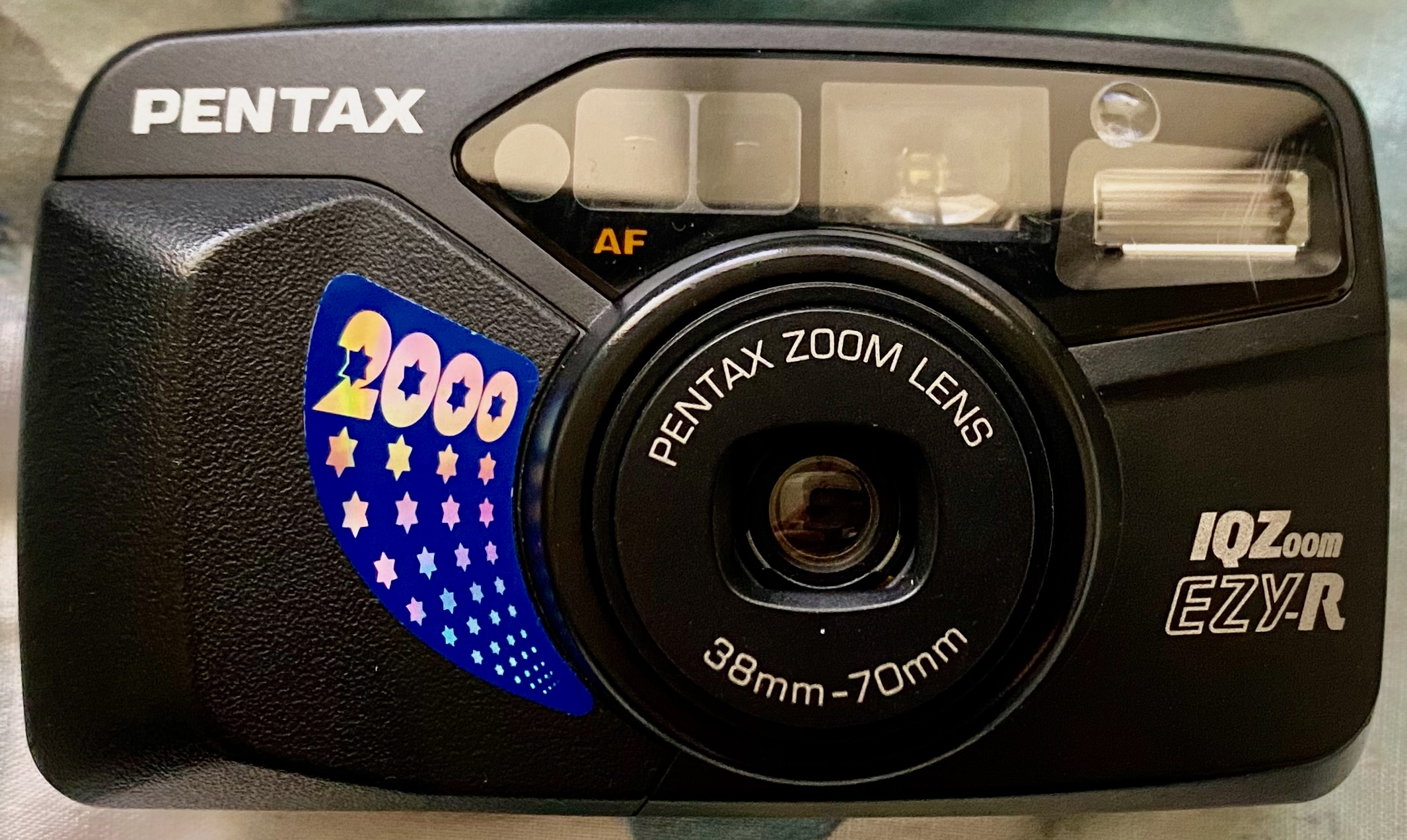
IQZoom EZY-R with promotional year 2000 sticker

North American market models

- IQ-Zoom 28W
- IQ-Zoom 60/60R/60S
- IQ-Zoom 70/70XL
- IQ-Zoom 80E/80G/80S
- IQ-Zoom 90MC/90WR
- IQ-Zoom 95S/95WR
- IQ-Zoom 105 Super/105R/105S/105SW/105WR
- IQ-Zoom 110
- IQ-Zoom 115/115G/115M/115S
- IQ-Zoom 120/120Mi/120SW
- IQ-Zoom 130M
- IQ-Zoom 135M
- IQ-Zoom 140/140M/140M Super
- IQ-Zoom 150SL
- IQ-Zoom 160
- IQ-Zoom 170SL
- IQ-Zoom 200
- IQ-Zoom 700
- IQ-Zoom 735
- IQ-Zoom 835
- IQ-Zoom 900
- IQ-Zoom 928/928M
- IQ-Zoom EZY/EZY-80/EZY-R/EZY-S

==== Pentax PC ====
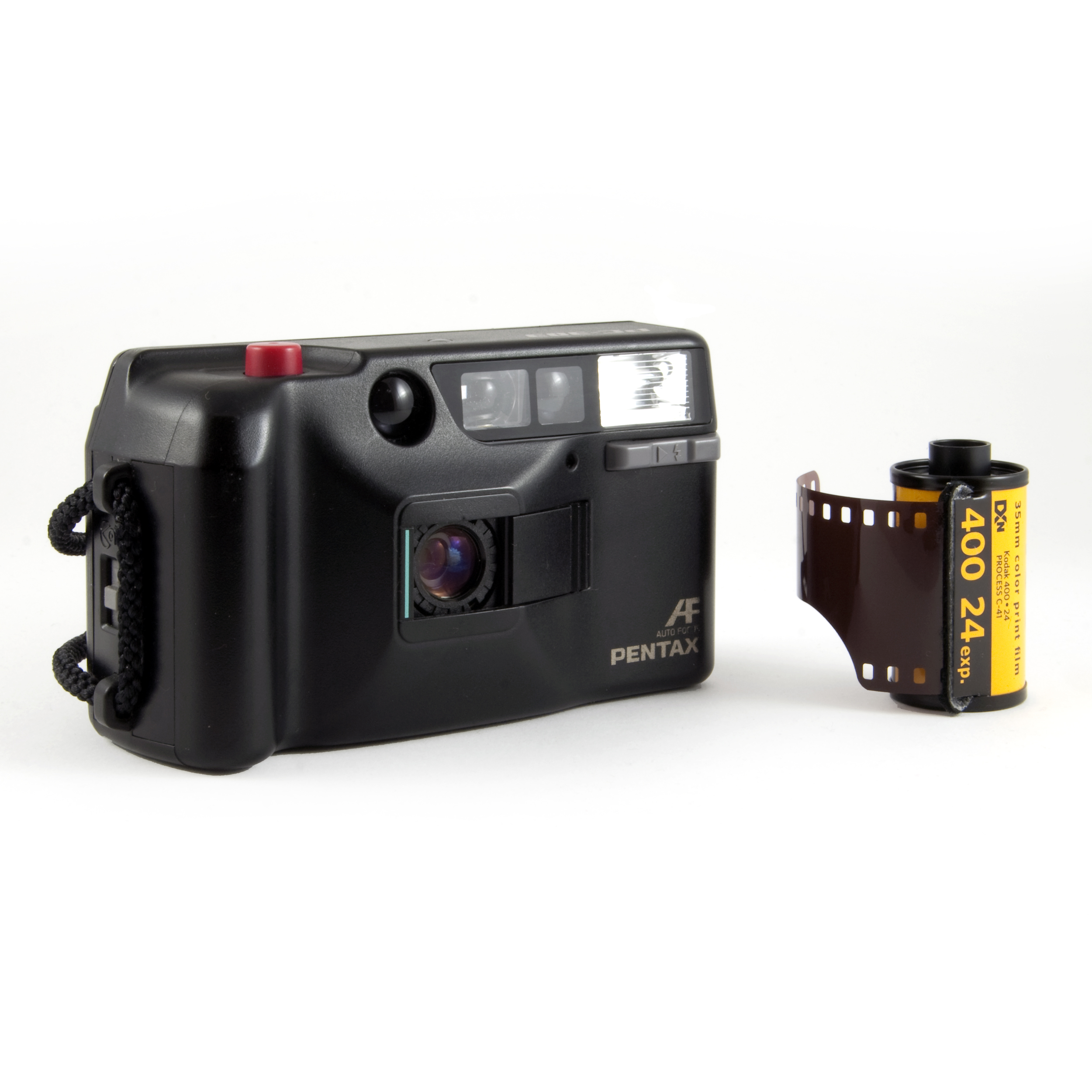
PC-303 camera

- PC 30
- PC 33
- PC 35AF/35AFM/35R
- PC 50
- PC 55
- PC 100
- PC 300
- PC 303
- PC 313
- PC 330
- PC 333
- PC 500
- PC 505
- PC 550
- PC 555
- PC 606 W
- PC 700
- PC 3000 (2001)
- PC 5000 (2001)

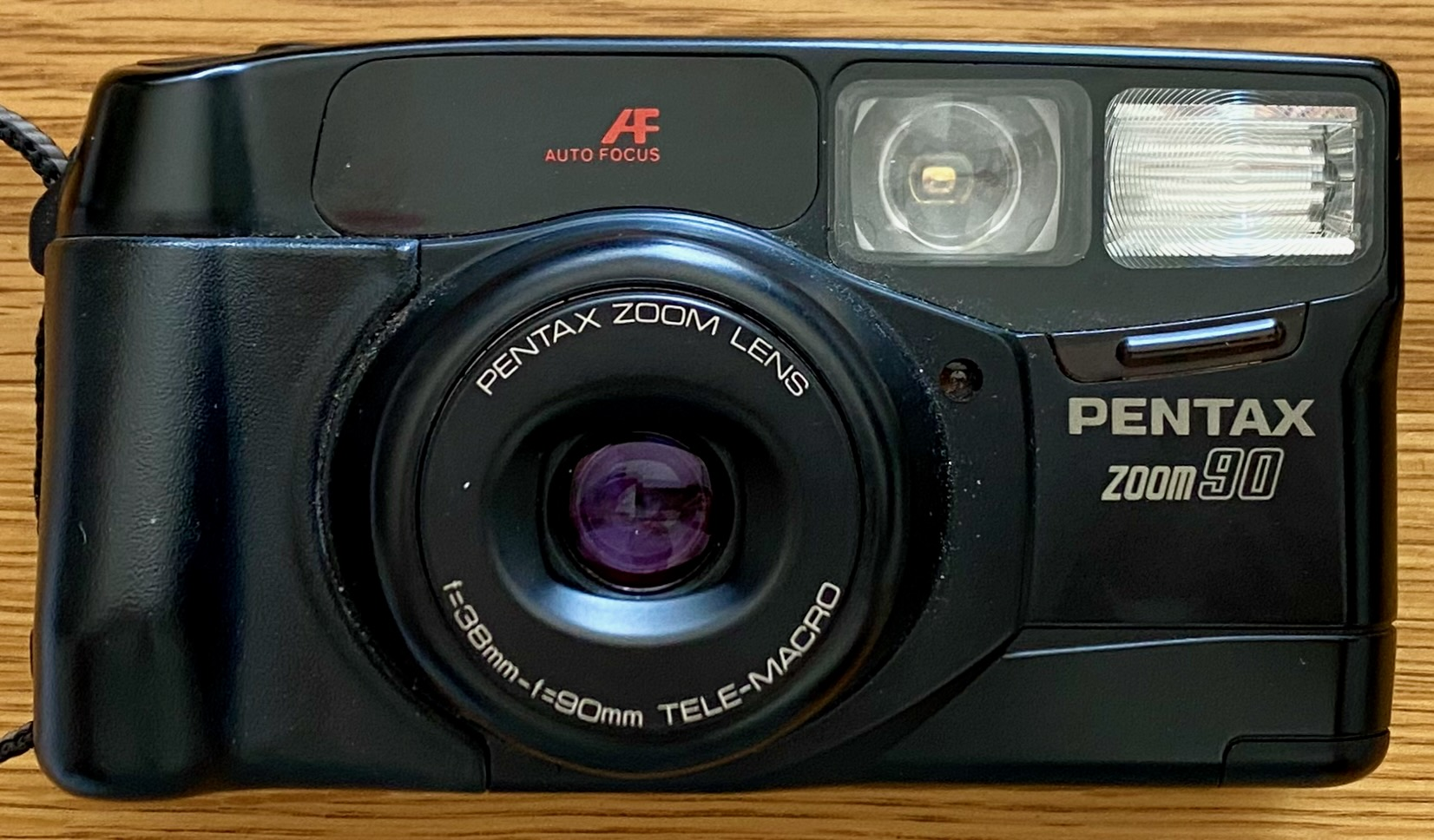
Pentax Zoom 90

==== Pentax Zoom ====
- Zoom 105R/105 Super
- Zoom 280P
- Zoom 60/60X
- Zoom 70/70R/70S/70X
- Zoom 90/90R/90WR

==== Other point-and-shoot cameras ====
- Mini Sport 35 I/II/AF/M
- Pino 35/35M
- Sport 35 Motor/Sport 35 Motor Date
- Sport/Sport Date
- UC-1
- Pentax 17

=== APS cameras ===
- Pentax efina (1997)
- Pentax efina AF50 (1999)
- Pentax efina J (2000)
- Pentax efina T (1999)

=== 110 film SLR cameras ===
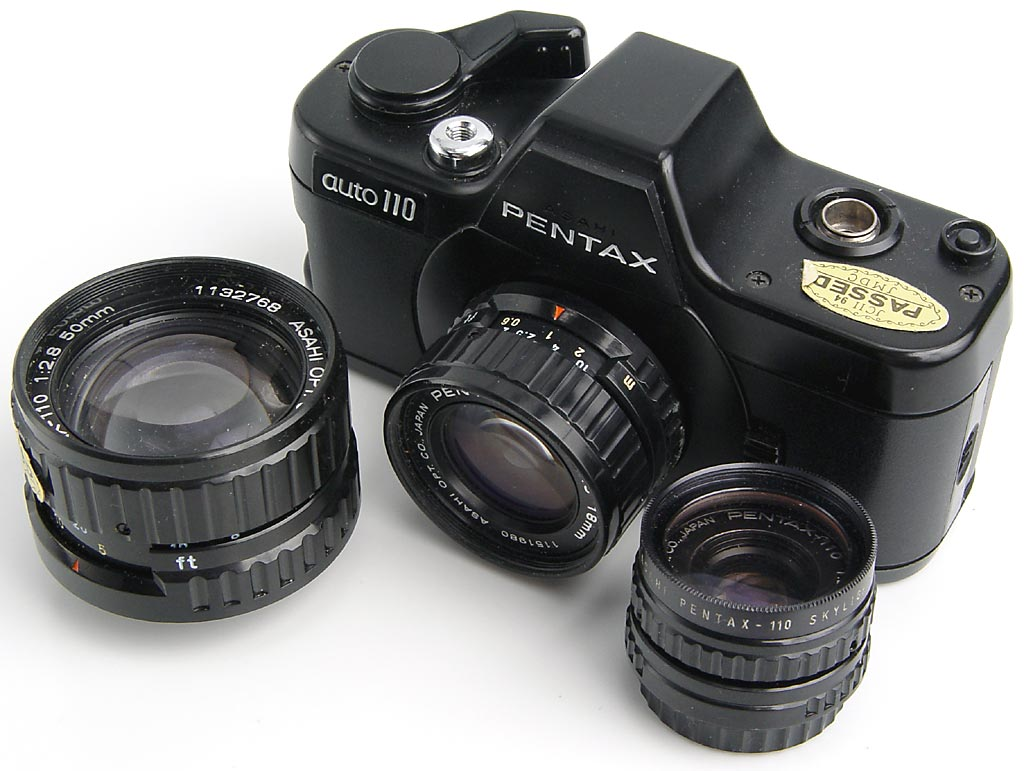
Pentax Auto 110 and lenses

- Pentax Auto 110 (1979)
- Pentax Auto 110 Super (1982)

=== Medium-format cameras ===
- Pentax 6x7 (1969)
- Pentax 67 (1990)
- Pentax 67II (1999)
- Pentax 645 (1984)
- Pentax 645N (1997)
- Pentax 645NII (2001)

== Digital cameras ==
=== Digital SLR cameras ===
==== Early Pentax DSLRs ====
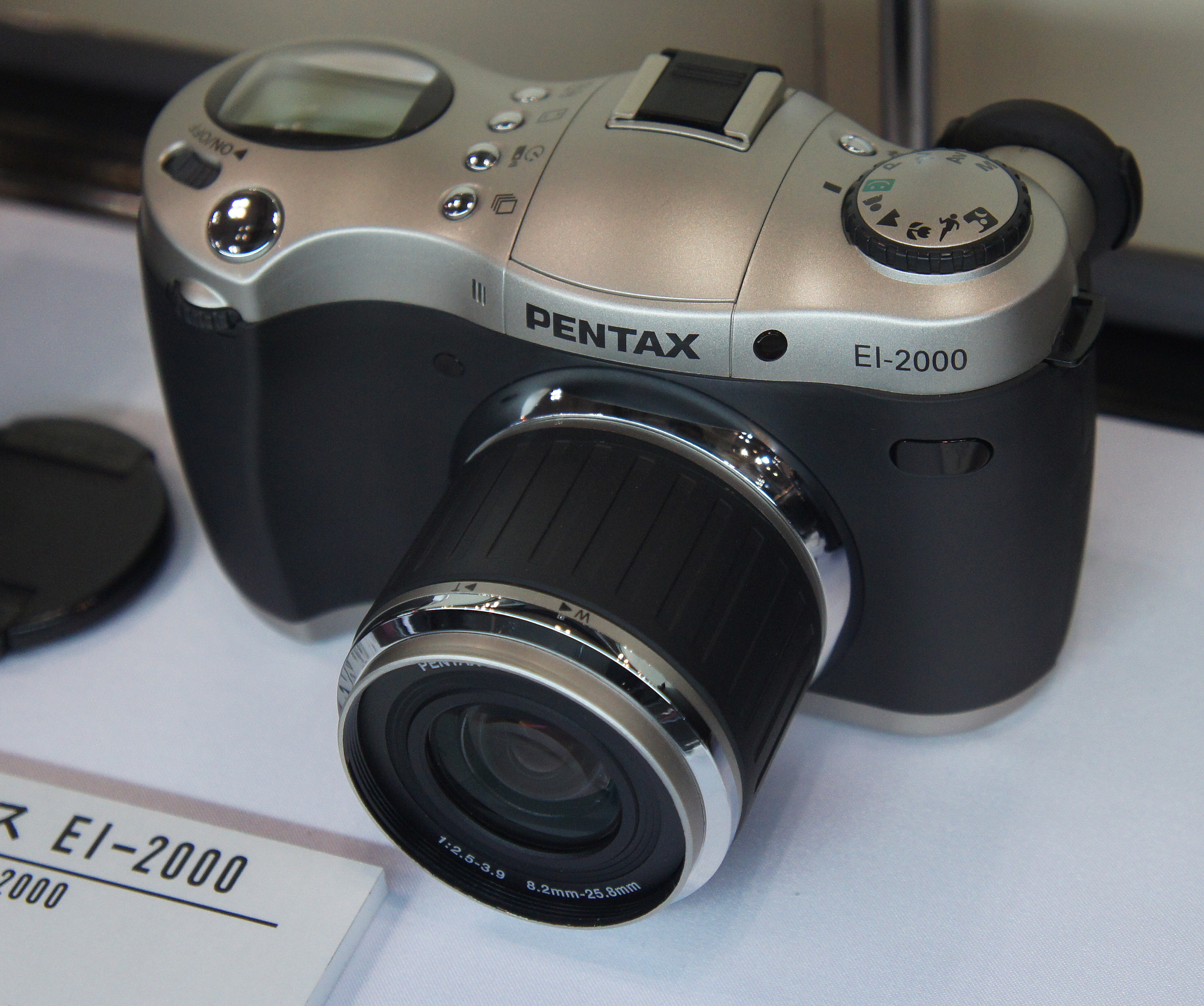
EI-2000 at CP+ 2011

- EI-2000 (2000) — identical to the HP PhotoSmart C912
- EI-3000 (2001) — prototype only

==== K-mount DSLRs ====
As of March 2018, 32 different models have been released. All K-series bodies (except the full-frame K-1) have APS-C 1.5x crop sensors and Pentax K lens mounts.

===== MZ series =====
- Pentax MZ-D (2000) — prototype, did not reach production

===== *ist series =====
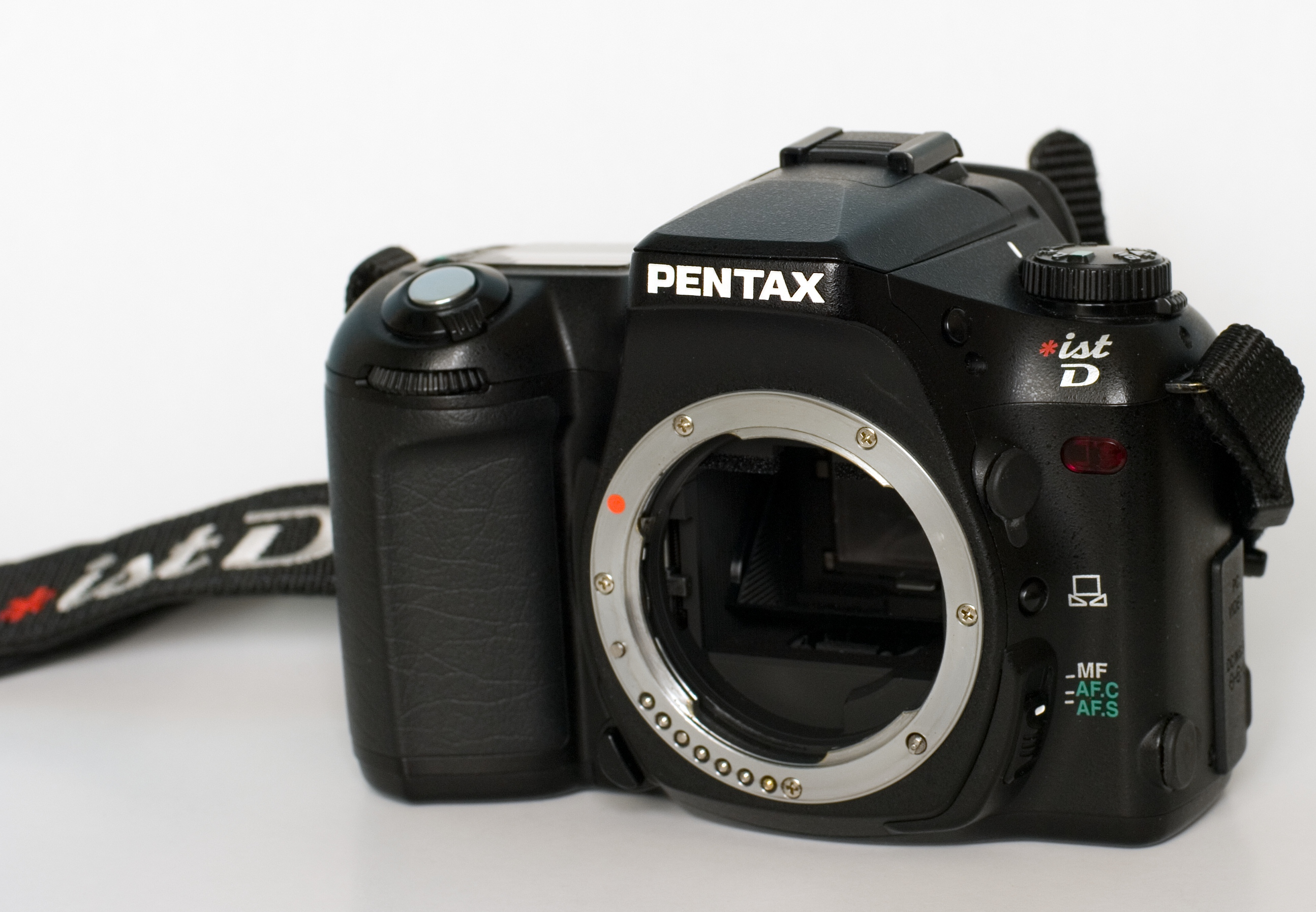
Pentax *ist D

- Pentax *ist D (2003)
- Pentax *ist DS (2004)
- Pentax *ist DL (2005)
- Pentax *ist DS2 (2004)
- Pentax *ist DL2 (2005)

===== K series =====
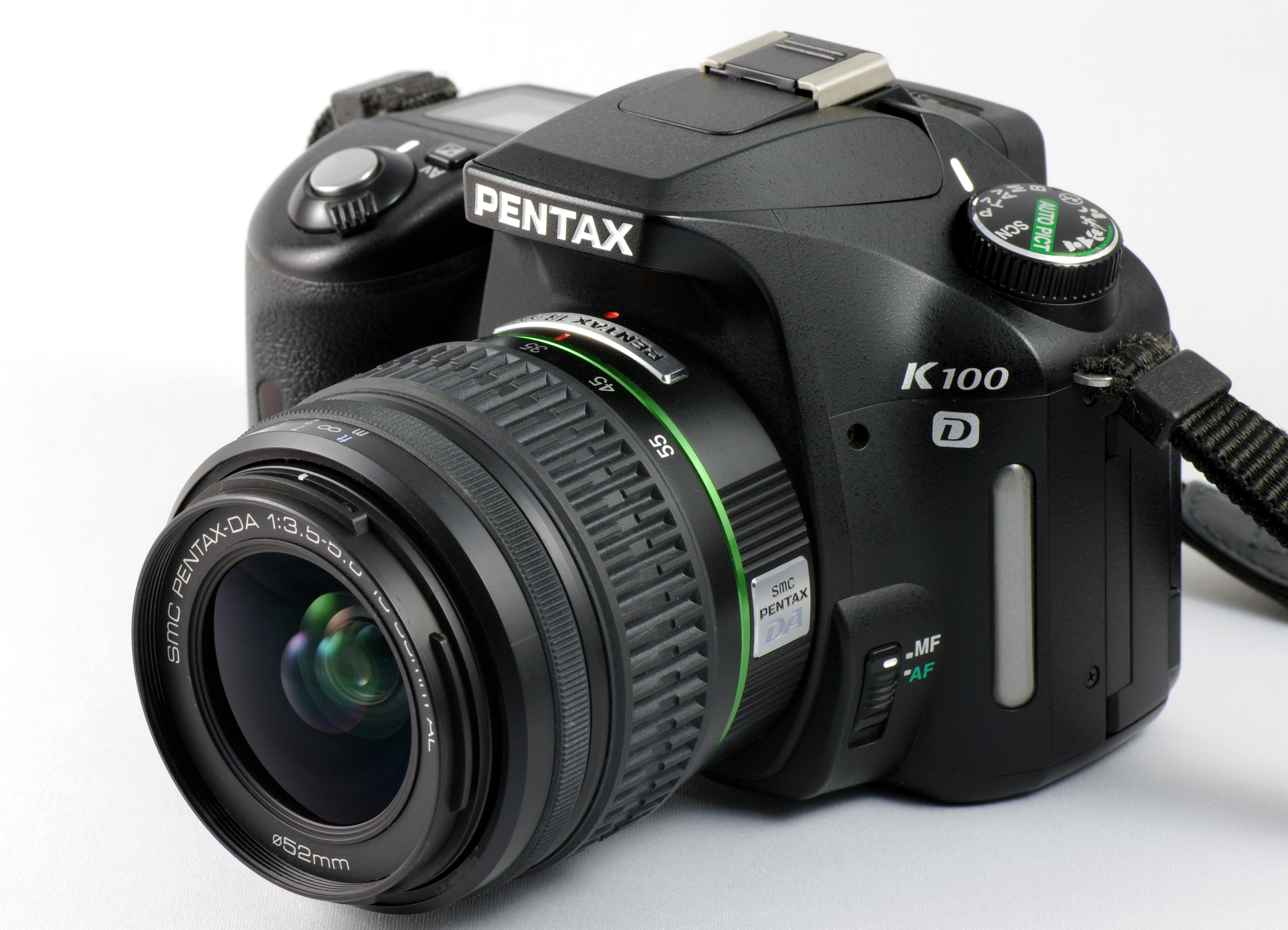
Pentax K100D with 18-55 mm zoom lens

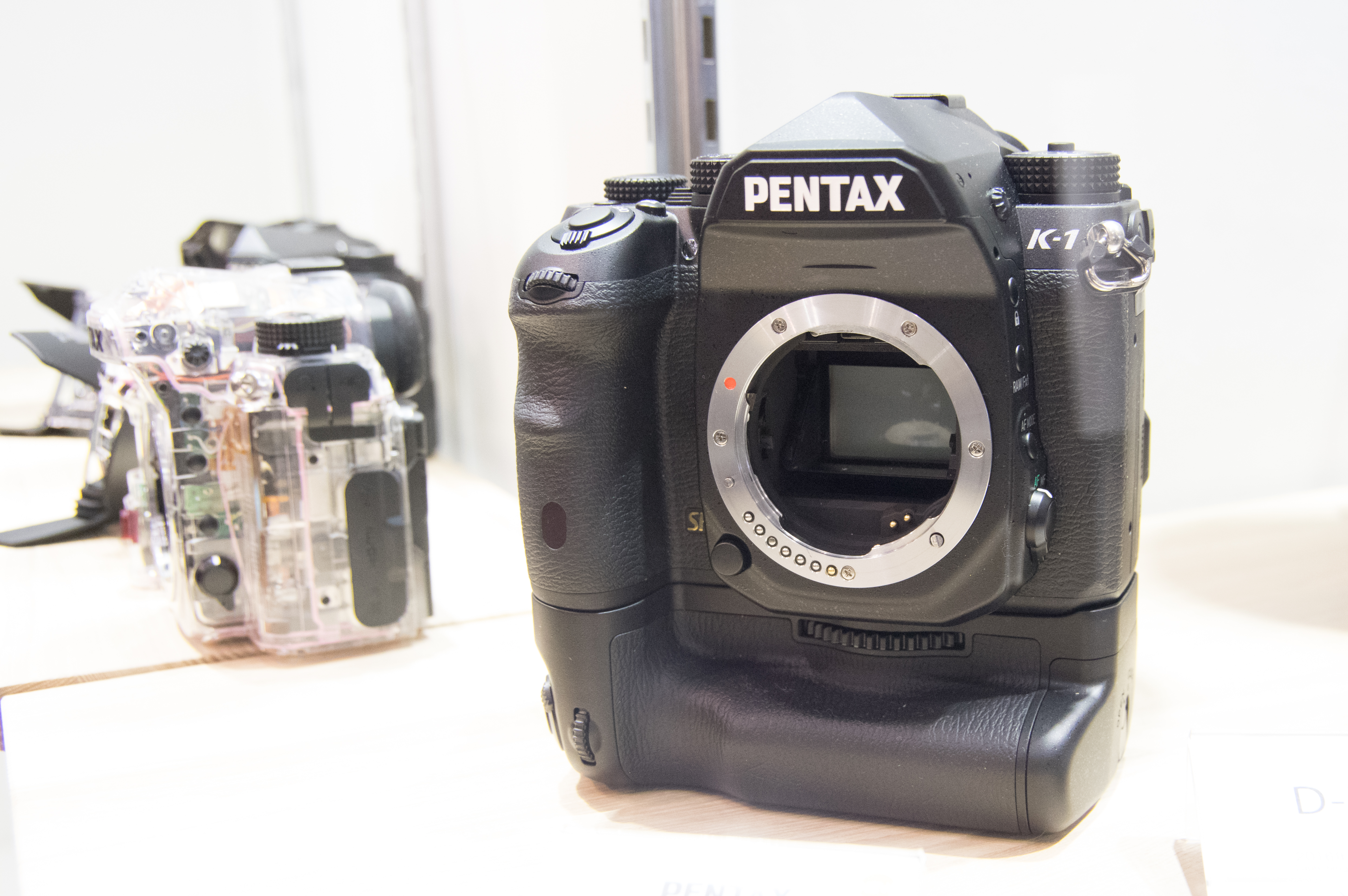
Pentax K-1 with D-BG6 battery grip

- Pentax K100D (2006)
- Pentax K110D (2006)
- Pentax K10D (2006)
- Pentax K100D Super (2007)
- Pentax K200D (2008)
- Pentax K20D (2008)
- Pentax K-m (K2000) (2008)
- Pentax K-7 (2009)
- Pentax K-x (2010)
- Pentax K-r (2010)
- Pentax K-5 (2010)
- Pentax K-30 (2012)
- Pentax K-5 II (2012) — replacement for the enthusiast-level K-5
- Pentax K-5 IIs (2012) — similar to the K-5 II, except that the sensor lacks an anti-aliasing filter
- Pentax K-3 (2013) — high-end APS-C model above the K-5 series
- Pentax K-50 (2013) — replacement for the mid-range K-30
- Pentax K-500 (2013) — entry level
- Pentax K-S1 (2014) — mid-level compact APS-C DSLR
- Pentax K-S2 (2015) — mid-level compact APS-C DSLR
- Pentax K-3 II (2015) — high-end APS-C model, enhanced K-3 (GPS, Astrotracer and Pixel Shift Resolution)
- Pentax K-1 (2016) — brand's first full-frame model
- Pentax K-70 (2016) — replacement for the mid-range K-50
- Pentax KP (2017) — higher-end APS-C model
- Pentax K-1 II (2018) — replacement for the K-1
- Pentax K-3 III (2021) — high-end APS-C model, enhanced K-3 (AF, ISO and optical viewfinder)
- Pentax KF (2022) — replacement for the mid-range K-70

==== Medium-format DSLRs ====
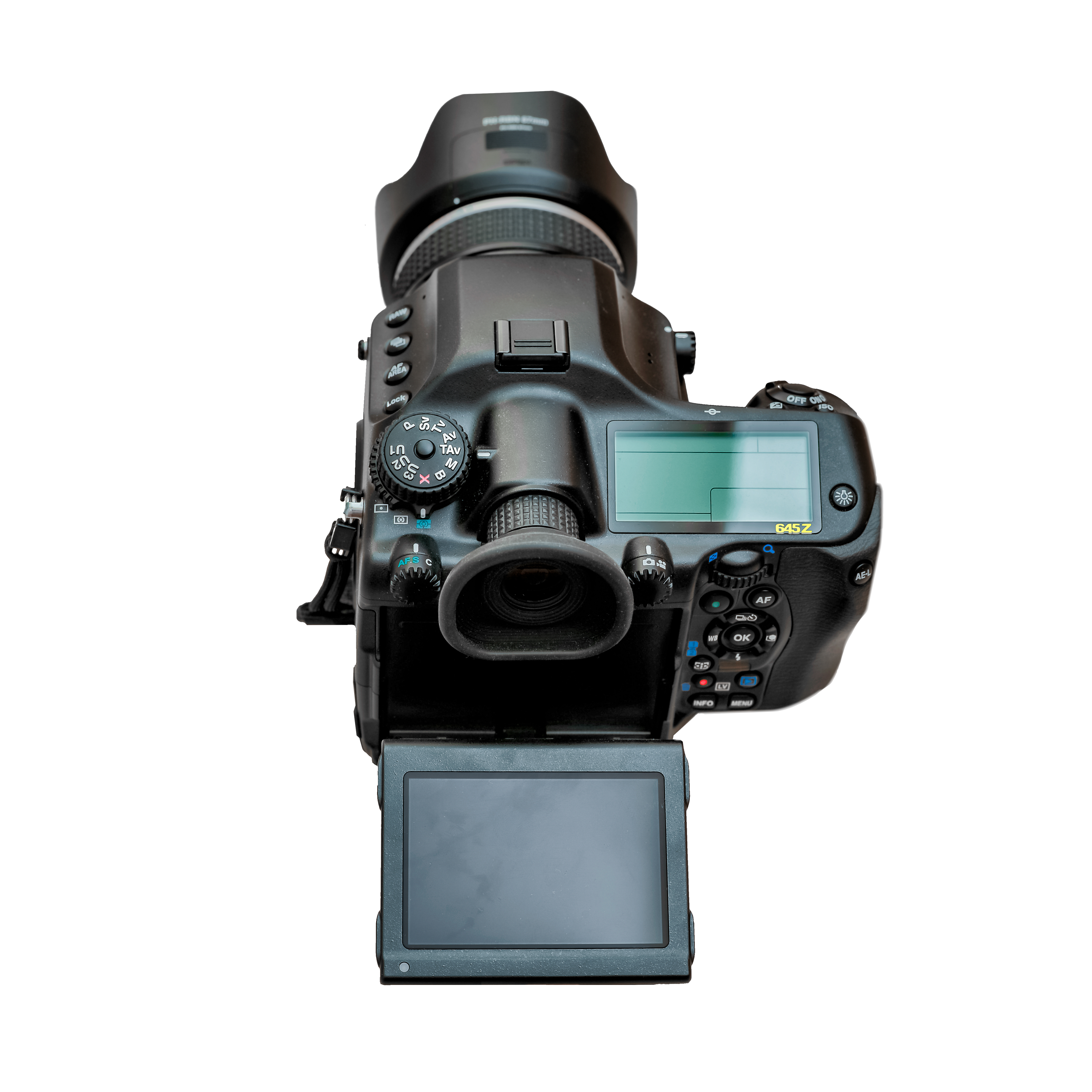
Pentax 645Z

- Pentax 645D (2010)
- Pentax 645D IR (2013) - IR-modified, only in Japan
- Pentax 645Z (2014)
- Pentax 645Z IR (2016) - IR-modified, only in Japan

=== Mirrorless interchangeable lens cameras ===
- Pentax Q (2011)
- Pentax Q10 (2012)
- Pentax Q7 (2013), similar to Pentax Q10, but has larger sensor (1/1.7")
- Pentax Q-S1 (2014), updated Q7
- Pentax K-01 (2012)

=== Digital compact cameras ===
==== Early Pentax compact digital cameras ====
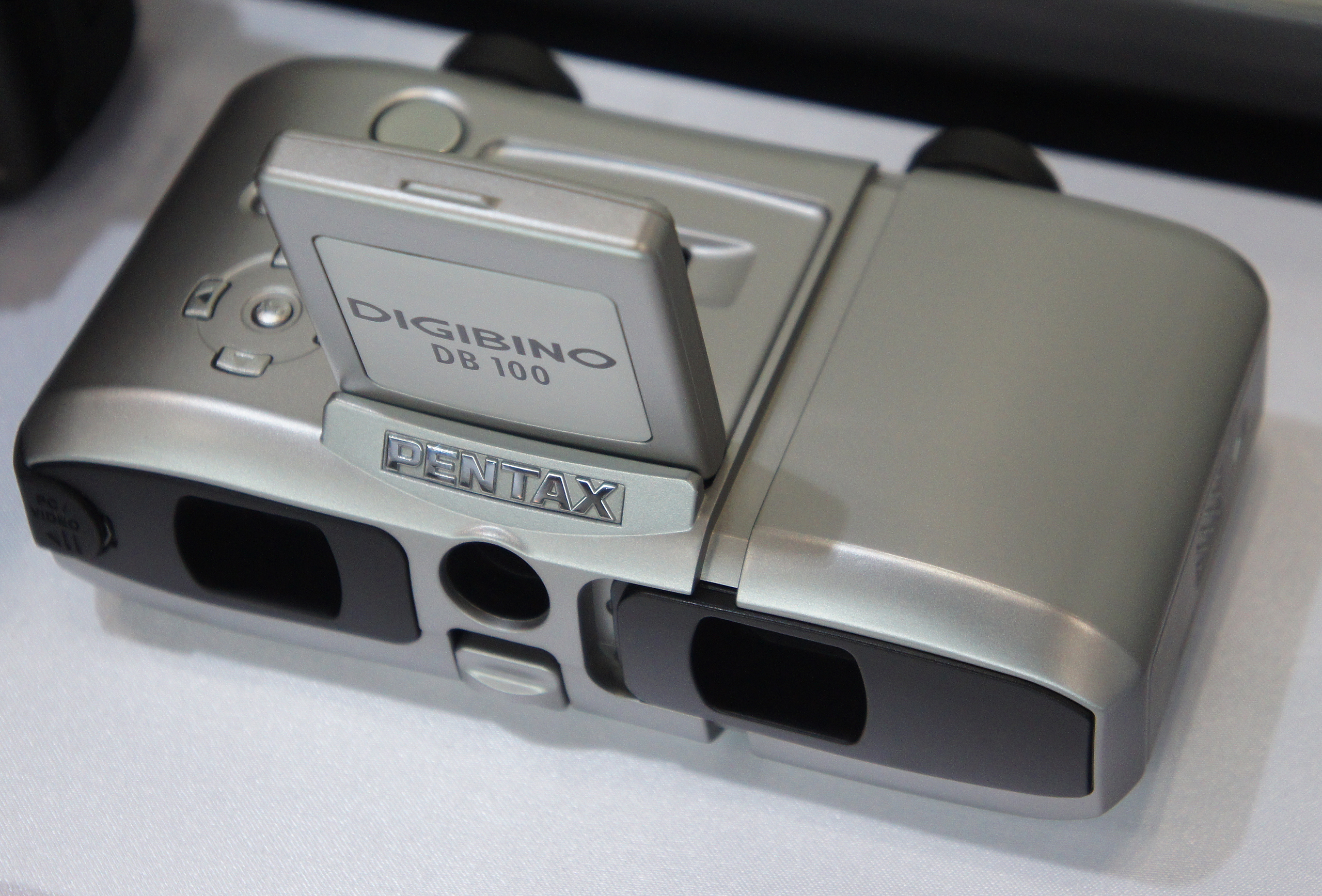
DB-100 binoculars/camera

- EI-C90 (1996) — detachable EI-L90 LCD screen
- EI-200 (2000) — Identical to the HP PhotoSmart C618
- EI-100 (2001)
- DB-100 (2002) — digital camera binoculars (note: single not stereo images)

==== Bridge cameras ====
- X70
- X90 (2010)
- X-5 (2012)
- XG-1 (2014)

== Lenses ==
=== K-mount lenses ===
K-mount lenses such as the original K and the M, A, F, FA, DA and DA* series.

==== Digital era prime lenses ====
- SMC Pentax-DA 14mm F2.8 ED [IF]
- HD Pentax-DA 15mm F4 ED AL Limited
- SMC Pentax-DA 15mm F4 ED AL Limited
- HD Pentax-DA 21mm F3.2 Limited
- SMC Pentax-DA 21mm F3.2 Limited
- SMC Pentax-DA 35mm F2.4 AL
- HD Pentax-DA 35mm F2.8 Limited Macro
- SMC Pentax-DA 35mm F2.8 Limited Macro
- HD Pentax-DA 40mm F2.8 Limited
- SMC Pentax-DA 40mm F2.8 Limited
- SMC Pentax-DA 50mm F1.8
- SMC Pentax-DA* 55mm F1.4 SDM
- HD Pentax-DA 70mm F2.4 Limited
- SMC Pentax-DA 70mm F2.4 Limited
- SMC Pentax-DA* 200mm F2.8 ED [IF] SDM
- SMC Pentax-DA* 300mm F4 ED [IF] SDM
- HD Pentax-DA 560mm F5.6 ED AW

==== Digital era zoom lenses ====
- HD Pentax-DA 10-17mm F3.5-4.5 Fish-Eye ED
- HD Pentax-DA 16-85mm F3.5-5.6 ED DC WR
- HD Pentax-DA 18-50mm F4-5.6 DC WR RE
- HD Pentax-DA 20-40mm F2.8-4 Limited DC WR
- HD Pentax-DA 55-300mm F4.5-6.3 ED PLM WR RE
- HD Pentax-DA 55-300mm F4-5.8 ED WR
- HD Pentax-DA* 11-18mm F2.8 ED DC AW
- SMC Pentax-DA 10-17mm F3.5-4.5 Fish-Eye ED [IF]
- SMC Pentax-DA 12-24mm F4 ED AL [IF]
- SMC Pentax-DA 16-45mm F4
- SMC Pentax-DA 17-70mm F4 AL [IF] SDM
- SMC Pentax-DA 18-135mm F3.5-5.6 ED AL [IF] DC WR
- SMC Pentax-DA 18-250mm F3.5-6.3 ED AL [IF]
- SMC Pentax-DA 18-270mm F3.5-6.3 ED SDM
- SMC Pentax-DA 18-55mm F3.5-5.6 AL
- SMC Pentax-DA 18-55mm F3.5-5.6 AL II
- SMC Pentax-DA 18-55mm F3.5-5.6 AL WR
- SMC Pentax-DA 50-200mm F4-5.6 ED
- SMC Pentax-DA 50-200mm F4-5.6 ED WR
- SMC Pentax-DA 55-300mm F4-5.8 ED
- SMC Pentax-DA* 16-50mm F2.8 ED AL [IF] SDM
- SMC Pentax-DA* 50-135mm F2.8 ED [IF] SDM
- SMC Pentax-DA* 60-250mm F4 ED [IF] SDM

==== Digital era kit zoom lenses ====
- SMC Pentax-DA L 18-50mm F4-5.6 DC WR RE
- SMC Pentax-DA L 18-55mm F3.5-5.6 AL
- SMC Pentax-DA L 18-55mm F3.5-5.6 AL WR
- SMC Pentax-DA L 50-200mm F4-5.6 ED
- SMC Pentax-DA L 50-200mm F4-5.6 ED WR
- SMC Pentax-DA L 55-300mm F4-5.8 ED

==== Full frame (35mm) film and digital era prime lenses ====
- HD Pentax-D FA 21mm F2.4 ED Limited DC WR
- HD Pentax-D FA* 50mm F1.4 SDM AW
- SMC Pentax-D FA 50mm F2.8 Macro
- HD Pentax-D FA* 85mm F1.4 SDM AW
- SMC Pentax-D FA 100mm F2.8 Macro
- SMC Pentax-D FA 100mm F2.8 Macro WR

==== Full frame (35mm) film and digital era zoom lenses ====
- HD Pentax-D FA 150-450mm F4.5-5.6 ED DC AW
- HD Pentax-D FA 15-30mm F2.8 ED SDM WR
- HD Pentax-D FA 24-70mm F2.8 ED SDM WR
- HD Pentax-D FA 28-105mm F3.5-5.6 ED DC WR
- HD Pentax-D FA 70-210mm F4 ED SDM WR
- HD Pentax-D FA* 70-200mm F2.8 ED DC AW

==== Compact lenses designed for K-01 camera ====
- SMC Pentax-DA 40mm F2.8 XS

==== Film era auto focus prime lenses ====
Compatible with all Pentax DSLRs

- SMC Pentax-FA 20mm F2.8
- SMC Pentax-FA* 24mm F2 AL [IF]
- SMC Pentax-FA 28mm F2.8 AL
- SMC Pentax-FA 28mm F2.8 Soft
- SMC Pentax-FA 31mm F1.8 AL Limited
- SMC Pentax-FA 35mm F2 AL
- HD Pentax-FA 35mm F2
- SMC Pentax-FA 43mm F1.9 Limited
- SMC Pentax-FA 50mm F1.4
- SMC Pentax-FA 50mm F1.7
- SMC Pentax-FA 50mm F2.8 Macro
- SMC Pentax-FA 77mm F1.8 Limited
- SMC Pentax-FA 85mm F2.8 Soft
- SMC Pentax-FA* 85mm F1.4 [IF]
- SMC Pentax-FA 100mm F2.8 Macro
- SMC Pentax-FA 100mm F3.5 Macro
- SMC Pentax-FA 135mm F2.8 [IF]
- SMC Pentax-FA* 200mm F2.8 ED [IF]
- SMC Pentax-FA* 200mm F4 Macro ED [IF]
- SMC Pentax-FA* 300mm F2.8 ED [IF]
- SMC Pentax-FA* 300mm F4.5 ED [IF]
- SMC Pentax-FA* 400mm F5.6 ED [IF]
- SMC Pentax-FA* 600mm F4 ED [IF]

==== Film era auto focus zoom lenses ====
Compatible with all Pentax DSLRs

- SMC Pentax-FA 100-300mm F4.5-5.6
- SMC Pentax-FA 100-300mm F4.7-5.8
- SMC Pentax-FA 20-35mm F4 AL
- SMC Pentax-FA 24-90mm F3.5-4.5 AL [IF]
- SMC Pentax-FA 28-105mm F3.2-4.5 AL [IF]
- SMC Pentax-FA 28-105mm F4-5.6 [IF]
- SMC Pentax-FA 28-200mm F3.8-5.6 AL [IF]
- SMC Pentax-FA 28-70mm F4 AL
- SMC Pentax-FA 28-80mm F3.5-4.7
- SMC Pentax-FA 28-80mm F3.5-5.6
- SMC Pentax-FA 28-80mm F3.5-5.6 AL
- SMC Pentax-FA 28-90mm F3.5-5.6
- SMC Pentax-FA 35-80mm F4-5.6
- SMC Pentax-FA 70-200mm F4-5.6
- SMC Pentax-FA 80-200mm F4.7-5.6
- SMC Pentax-FA 80-320mm F4.5-5.6
- SMC Pentax-FA* 250-600mm F5.6 ED [IF]
- SMC Pentax-FA* 28-70mm F2.8 AL
- SMC Pentax-FA* 80-200mm F2.8 ED [IF]
- SMC-Pentax FA 28-105mm F4-5.6

==== Film era auto focus budget zoom lenses ====
Compatible with all Pentax DSLRs

- SMC Pentax-FA J 18-35mm F4-5.6
- SMC Pentax-FA J 28-80mm F3.5-5.6 AL
- SMC Pentax-FA J 75-300mm F4.5-5.8 AL

==== Film era auto focus prime lenses ====
Compatible with all Pentax DSLRs

- SMC Pentax-F 28mm F2.8
- SMC Pentax-F 50mm F1.4
- SMC Pentax-F 50mm F1.7
- SMC Pentax-F 50mm F2.8 Macro
- SMC Pentax-F 85mm F2.8 Soft
- SMC Pentax-F 100mm F2.8 Macro
- SMC Pentax-F 135mm F2.8 [IF]
- SMC Pentax-F* 300mm F4.5 ED [IF]
- SMC Pentax-F* 600mm F4 ED [IF]

==== Film era auto focus zoom lenses ====
Compatible with all Pentax DSLRs

- SMC Pentax-F 100-300mm F4.5-5.6
- SMC Pentax-F 17-28mm F3.5-4.5 Fish-Eye
- SMC Pentax-F 24-50mm F4
- SMC Pentax-F 28-80mm F3.5-4.5
- SMC Pentax-F 35-105mm F4-5.6
- SMC Pentax-F 35-135mm F3.5-4.5
- SMC Pentax-F 35-70mm F3.5-4.5
- SMC Pentax-F 35-80mm F4-5.6
- SMC Pentax-F 70-210mm F4-5.6
- SMC Pentax-F 80-200mm F4.7-5.6
- SMC Pentax-F* 250-600mm F5.6 ED [IF]

==== Film era manual focus, auto aperture, prime lenses ====
Compatible with all Pentax DSLRs

- SMC Pentax-A 15mm F3.5
- SMC Pentax-A 16mm F2.8 Fish-Eye
- SMC Pentax-A 20mm F2.8
- SMC Pentax-A 24mm F2.8
- SMC Pentax-A 28mm F2
- SMC Pentax-A 28mm F2.8
- Takumar-A 28mm F2.8
- SMC Pentax-A 35mm F2
- SMC Pentax-A 35mm F2.8
- SMC Pentax-A 50mm F1.2
- SMC Pentax-A 50mm F1.4
- SMC Pentax-A 50mm F1.7
- SMC Pentax-A 50mm F2
- SMC Pentax-A 50mm F2.8 Macro
- SMC Pentax A* 85mm F1.4
- SMC Pentax-A 100mm F2.8
- SMC Pentax-A 100mm F2.8 Macro
- SMC Pentax-A 100mm F4 Macro
- SMC Pentax-A 135mm F2.8
- SMC Pentax-A* 135mm F1.8
- SMC Pentax A* 200mm F2.8 ED
- SMC Pentax-A 200mm F4
- SMC Pentax-A* 200mm F4 Macro ED
- SMC Pentax-A* 300mm F2.8 ED [IF]
- SMC Pentax-A* 300mm F4
- SMC Pentax-A 400mm F5.6
- SMC Pentax-A* 400mm F2.8 ED [IF]
- SMC Pentax-A* 600mm F5.6 ED [IF]
- SMC Pentax-A* 1200mm F8 ED [IF]

==== Film era manual focus, auto aperture, zoom lenses ====
Compatible with all Pentax DSLRs

- SMC Pentax-A 24-50mm F4
- SMC Pentax-A 28-135mm F4
- SMC Pentax-A 28-80mm F3.5-4.5
- SMC Pentax-A 35-105mm F3.5
- SMC Pentax-A 35-135mm F3.5-4.5
- SMC Pentax-A 35-210mm F3.5-4.5
- SMC Pentax-A 35-70mm F3.5-4.5
- SMC Pentax-A 35-70mm F4
- SMC Pentax-A 35-80mm F4-5.6
- SMC Pentax-A 70-210mm F4
- SMC Pentax-A 80-200mm F4.7-5.6

==== Film era manual prime lenses ====
Compatible with all Pentax DSLRs

- SMC Pentax-M 20mm F4
- SMC Pentax-M 28mm F2
- SMC Pentax-M 28mm F2.8
- Takumar 28mm F2.8 Bayonet
- SMC Pentax-M 28mm F3.5
- SMC Pentax-M 35mm F1.4
- SMC Pentax-M 35mm F2
- SMC Pentax-M 35mm F2.8
- SMC Pentax-M 40mm F2.8
- SMC Pentax-M 50mm F1.4
- SMC Pentax-M 50mm F1.7
- SMC Pentax-M 50mm F2
- SMC Pentax-M 50mm F4 Macro
- SMC Pentax-M 85mm F2
- SMC Pentax-M 100mm F2.8
- SMC Pentax-M 100mm F4 Macro
- SMC Pentax-M 120mm F2.8
- SMC Pentax-M 135mm F3.5
- Takumar 135mm F2.8 Bayonet
- Takumar 135mm F2.5 Bayonet
- SMC Pentax-M 150mm F3.5
- SMC Pentax-M 200mm F4
- SMC Pentax-M* 300mm F4
- SMC Pentax-M 400mm F5.6
- SMC Pentax-M Reflex 2000mm F13.5

==== Film era manual zoom lenses ====
Compatible with all Pentax DSLRs

- SMC Pentax-AF 35-70mm F2.8
- SMC Pentax-M 24-35mm F3.5
- SMC Pentax-M 24-50mm F4
- SMC Pentax-M 28-50mm F3.5-4.5
- SMC Pentax-M 35-70mm F2.8-3.5
- SMC Pentax-M 40-80mm F2.8-4
- SMC Pentax-M 75-150mm F4
- SMC Pentax-M 80-200mm F4.5

==== Original manual K-mount prime lenses ====
Compatible with all Pentax DSLRs

- SMC Pentax 15mm F3.5
- SMC Pentax 17mm F4 Fish-Eye
- SMC Pentax 18mm F3.5
- SMC Pentax 20mm F4
- SMC Pentax 24mm F2.8
- SMC Pentax 24mm F3.5
- SMC Pentax 28mm F2
- SMC Pentax 28mm F3.5
- SMC Pentax 28mm F3.5 Shift
- SMC Pentax 30mm F2.8
- SMC Pentax 35mm F2
- SMC Pentax 35mm F3.5
- SMC Pentax 50mm F1.2
- SMC Pentax 50mm F1.4
- SMC Pentax 50mm F4 Macro
- SMC Pentax 55mm F1.8
- SMC Pentax 55mm F2
- SMC Pentax 85mm F1.8
- SMC Pentax 85mm F2.2 Soft
- SMC Pentax 100mm F4 Bellows
- SMC Pentax 100mm F4 Macro
- SMC Pentax 105mm F2.8
- SMC Pentax 120mm F2.8
- SMC Pentax 135mm F2.5
- SMC Pentax 135mm F3.5
- SMC Pentax 150mm F4
- SMC Pentax 200mm F2.5
- SMC Pentax 200mm F4
- SMC Pentax 300mm F4
- SMC Pentax 400mm F5.6
- SMC Pentax 500mm F4.5
- SMC Pentax 1000mm F8
- SMC Pentax Reflex 1000mm F11
- SMC Pentax Reflex 2000mm F13.5

==== Original manual K-mount zoom lenses ====
Compatible with all Pentax DSLRs

- SMC Pentax 28-50mm F3.5-4.5
- SMC Pentax 45-125mm F4
- SMC Pentax 80-200mm F4.5
- SMC Pentax 85-210mm F3.5
- SMC Pentax 85-210mm F4.5
- SMC Pentax 135-600mm F6.7
- SMC Pentax 400-600mm Reflex

==== Pentax K-mount Teleconverters and Adapters ====
- HD Pentax-DA 1.4x AW AF Rear Converter
- Pentax Adapter K for 645 Lens (645 to K mount)
- Pentax Adapter K for 6x7 Lens (6x7 to K Mount)
- Pentax Mount Adapter K (M42 Screwmount to K Mount)
- Rear Converter K T6-2X
- Rear Converter-A 1.4x-L
- Rear Converter-A 1.4x-S
- Rear Converter-A 2x-L
- Rear Converter-A 2x-S
- SMC Pentax-F 1.7x AF Adapter
- Takumar-A 2x Tele-Converter

=== M37 screw mount lenses ===
Lenses for the Asahiflex series cameras.

- Asahi Kogaku Takumar 50 mm f/3.5 (1952)
- Asahi Kogaku Takumar 58 mm f/2.4 (1954)
- Asahi Kogaku Takumar 83 mm f/1.9 (1953)
- Asahi Kogaku Takumar 100 mm f/3.5 (1952)
- Asahi Kogaku Tele-photo 135 mm f/3.5 (1953)
- Asahi Kogaku Tele-photo Takumar 500 mm f/5.0 (1955)

=== M42 screw mount lenses ===
Lenses for the Asahi Pentax and Pentax Spotmatic series cameras.

- Takumar 35 mm f/4.0 (1957)
- Takumar 55 mm f/2.2 (1957)
- Takumar 58 mm f/2.0 (1957)
- Takumar 58 mm f/2.4 (1957)
- Takumar 100 mm f/3.5 (1957)
- Takumar 500 mm f/5.0 (1957)
- Takumar 55 mm f/1.8 (1958)
- Takumar 58 mm f/1.8 (1958)
- Auto-Takumar 55 mm f/1.8 (1958)
- Auto-Takumar 55 mm f/1.9 (1958) - Sears model (?)
- Auto-Takumar 55 mm f/2.0 (1958)
- Takumar 83 mm f/1.9 (1958)
- Takumar 105 mm f/2.8 (1958)
- Takumar 135 mm f/3.5 (1958)
- Takumar 300 mm f/4.0 (1958)
- Auto-Takumar 35 mm f/2.3 (1959)
- Auto-Takumar 35 mm f/3.5 (1959)
- Auto-Takumar 105 mm f/2.8 (1959)
- Takumar 200 mm f/3.5 (1959)
- Auto-Takumar 55 mm f/1.8 (1960)
- Auto-Takumar 85 mm f/1.8 (1960)
- Auto-Takumar 135 mm f/3.5 (1960)
- Auto-Takumar 55 mm f/2.2 (1961)
- Takumar 1000 mm f/8.0 (1961)
- Super Takumar 28 mm f/3.5 (1962)
- Super Takumar 35 mm f/3.5 (1962)
- Super Takumar 55 mm f/1.8 (1962)
- Super Takumar 55 mm f/2.0 (1962)
- Super Takumar 85 mm f/1.9 (1962)
- Takumar 105 mm f/2.8 (1962)
- Super Takumar 105 mm f/2.8 (1962)
- Takumar 135 mm f/3.5 (1962)
- Super Takumar 135 mm f/3.5 (1962)
- Takumar 200 mm f/3.5 (1962)
- Tele-Takumar 200 mm f/5.6 (1962)
- Tele-Takumar 300 mm f/6.3 (1962)
- Takumar 1000 mm f/8.0 (1962)
- f/ish-Eye Takumar 18 mm f/11 (1963)
- Super Takumar 55 mm f/1.8 (1963)
- Super Takumar 55 mm f/2.0 (1963)
- Takumar 135 mm f/3.5 (1963)
- Super Takumar 35 mm f/3.5 (1964)
- Super Takumar 50 mm f/1.4 (1964)
- Super Takumar 55 mm f/1.8 (1964)
- Super Takumar 55 mm f/2.0 (1964)
- Takumar 100 mm f/2.0 (1964)
- Super Takumar 105 mm f/2.8 (1964)
- Super Takumar 28 mm f/3.5 (1965)
- Super Takumar 85 mm f/1.9 (1965)
- Tele-Takumar 1000 mm f/8.0 (1965)
- Super Takumar 19 mm f/5.0 (1966)
- Super Takumar 28 mm f/3.5 (1966)
- Super Takumar 35 mm f/3.5 (1966)
- Macro Takumar 50 mm f/4 (1966)
- Super Takumar Zoom 70–150 mm f/4.5 (1966)
- Quartz Takumar 85 mm f/3.5 (1966) - UV bellows lens with a quartz-fluoride element
- Ultra-Achromatic Takumar 85 mm f/4.5 (1966) - UV lens with a quartz-fluoride element
- Bellows-Takumar 100 mm f/4 (1966)
- Super Takumar 135 mm f/3.5 (196)
- Takumar 300 mm f/4.0 (1966)
- Takumar 500 mm f/4.5 (1966)
- Super Takumar 50 mm f/1.4 (1967)

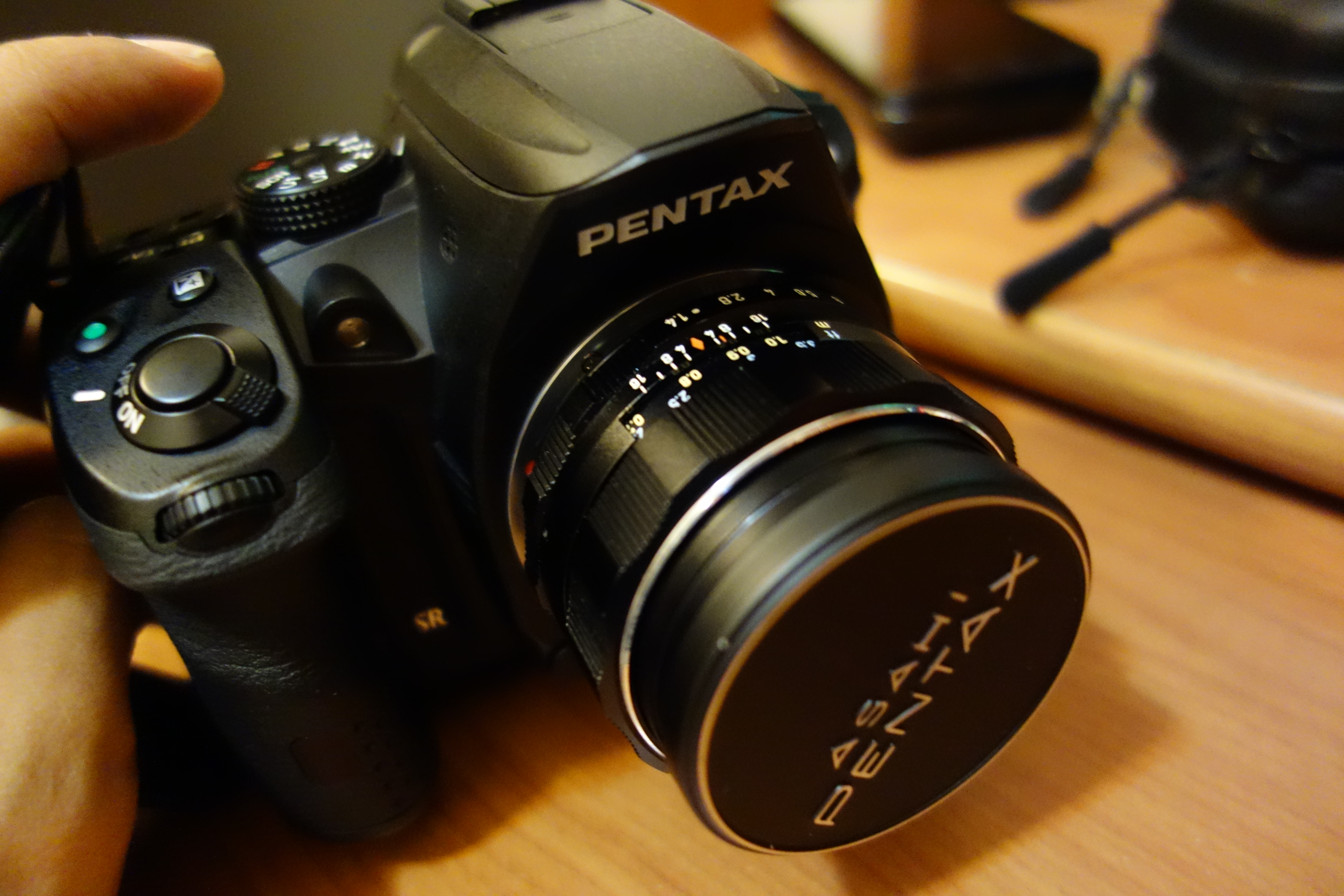
Pentax K-30 with a Super-Takumar 50 mm f/1.4 lens

- Super f/ish-Eye-Takumar 17 mm f/4.0 (1968)
- Super Takumar 35 mm f/2.0 (1968)
- Super Takumar 135 mm f/2.5 (1968)
- Super Takumar 150 mm f/4.0 (1968)
- Super Takumar 200 mm f/4.0 (1968)
- Super Takumar 24 mm f/3.5 (1969)
- Super Macro-Takumar 50 mm f/4.0 (1969)
- Super Takumar 300 mm f/4.0 (1969)
- Tele-Takumar 400 mm f/5.6 (1969)
- Super Takumar 20 mm f/4.5 (1971)
- S-M-C Takumar 28 mm f/3.5 (1971)
- S-M-C Takumar 35 mm f/3.5 (1971)
- S-M-C Takumar 50 mm f/1.4 (1971)
- S-M-C Macro-Takumar 50 mm f/4.0 (1971)
- S-M-C Takumar 55 mm f/1.8 (1971)
- S-M-C Takumar 85 mm f/1.9 (1971)
- S-M-C Takumar Zoom 85–210 mm f/4.5 (1971)
- S-M-C Takumar 105 mm f/2.8 (1971)
- S-M-C Takumar 135 mm f/2.5 (1971)
- S-M-C Takumar 135 mm f/3.5 (1971)
- S-M-C Takumar 150 mm f/4.0 (1971)
- S-M-C Takumar 200 mm f/4.0 (1971)
- S-M-C Bellows Takumar 100 mm f/4 (1971)
- S-M-C Takumar 400 mm f/5.6 (1971)
- S-M-C Takumar 500 mm f/4.5 (1971)
- S-M-C Takumar 1000 mm f/8 (1971)
- S-M-C Takumar 35 mm f/2.0 (1972)
- S-M-C Takumar 300 mm f/4.0 (1972)
- SMC Takumar 50 mm f/1.4 (1972)
- SMC Takumar 55 mm f/1.8 (1972)
- S-M-C f/ish-Eye-Takumar 17 mm f/4 (1973)
- S-M-C Takumar 20 mm f/4.5 (1973)
- S-M-C Takumar 24 mm f/3.5 (1973)
- S-M-C Takumar 50 mm f/1.4 (1973)
- S-M-C Takumar 55 mm f/1.8 (1973)
- S-M-C Takumar 55 mm f/2.0 (1973)
- S-M-C Takumar 85 mm f/1.8 (1973)
- Ultra-Achromatic Takumar 85 mm f/4.5 (1973) - UV lens with a quartz-fluoride element
- S-M-C Takumar 120 mm f/2.8 (1973)
- Super Takumar 135 mm f/2.5 (1973)
- Super-Achromatic Takumar 300 mm f/5.6 (1973) - UV lens with a quartz-fluoride element
- SMC Takumar 55 mm f/2.0 (1974)
- SMC Takumar 15 mm f/3.5 (1975)
- SMC Takumar Zoom 45–125 mm f/4.0 (1975)
- S-M-C Macro Takumar 100 mm f/4.0 (1975)
- S-M-C Takumar Zoom 135–600 mm f/6.7 (1975)

=== Q-mount lenses ===
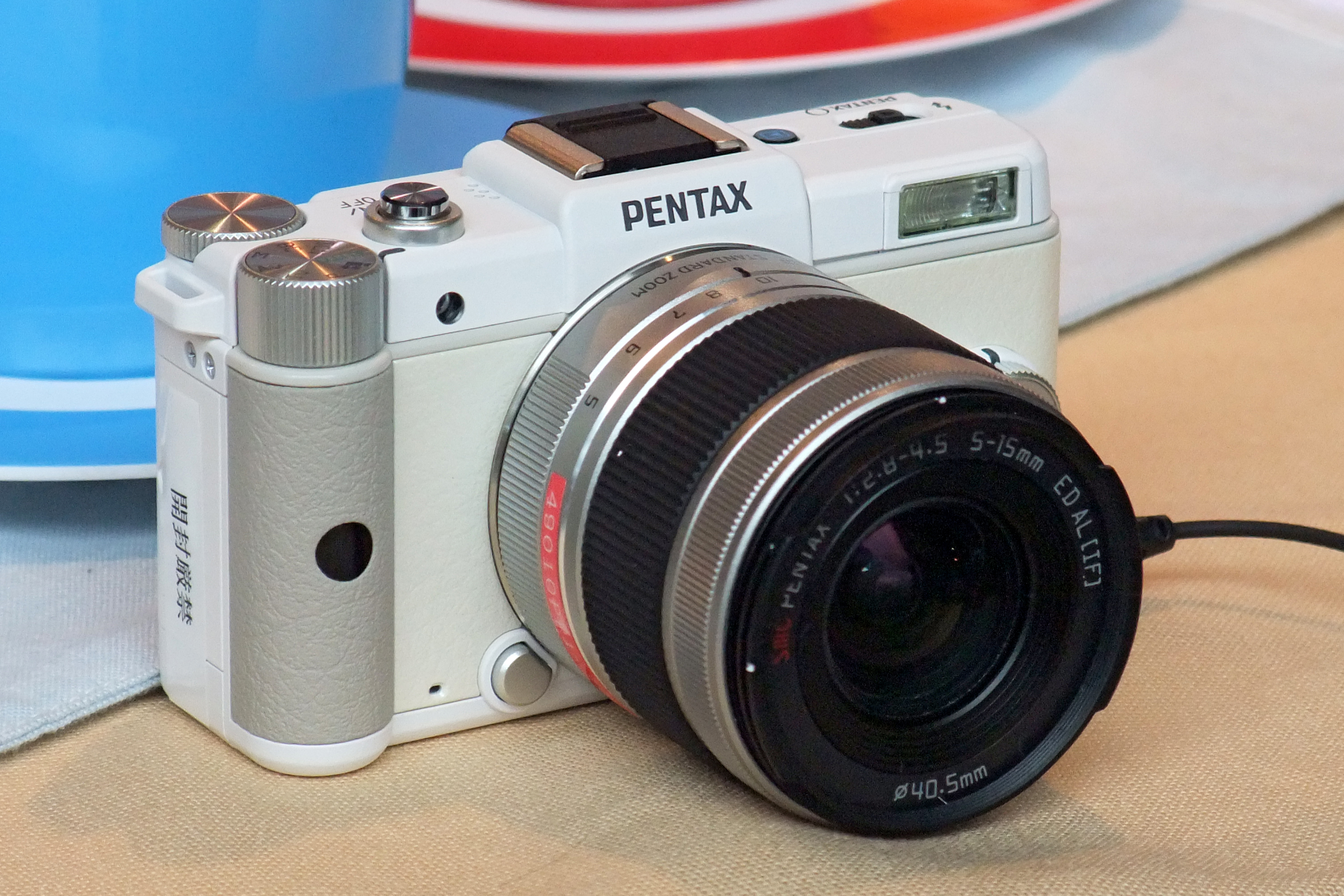
Pentax Q with 02 Standard Zoom

Five lenses have been released for the Pentax Q. A sixth lens and an adapter were announced in September, 2012.

- Pentax 01 Standard Prime (2011) — 47 mm equivalent
- Pentax 02 Standard Zoom (2011) — 28–80 mm equivalent
- Pentax 03 Fisheye (2011) — 17.5 mm equivalent
- Pentax 04 Toy Lens Wide (2011) — 35 mm equivalent
- Pentax 05 Toy Lens Telephoto (2011) — 100 mm equivalent
- Pentax 06 Telephoto Zoom (announced in 2012) — 83–249 mm equivalent
- Pentax Adapter Q for K-Mount Lens (announced in 2012)

== Camera accessories ==
=== Flashes ===
==== Pentax AF Series ====
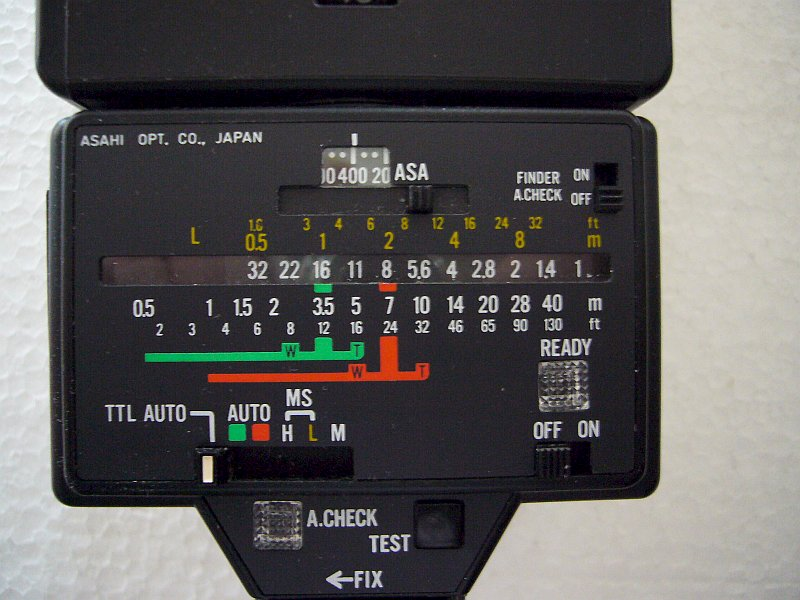
Rear of Pentax AF-280T

- Takumar AF-14
- Asahi Pentax AF-16
- Pentax AF-080C — ring flash
- Pentax AF-100P - for the Auto 110 series
- Pentax AF-130P - for the Auto 110 series
- Pentax AF-140C — ring flash
- Pentax AF-160FC — ring flash
- Asahi Pentax AF-160A
- Pentax AF-160S
- Pentax AF-200FG
- Pentax AF-200S
- Pentax AF-200Sa
- Pentax AF-200T
- Pentax AF-201SA
- Pentax AF-220T
- Pentax AF-240Z
- Pentax AF-260a
- Pentax AF-280T
- Pentax AF-330FTZ
- Pentax AF-360FGZ
- Pentax AF-400FTZ
- Pentax AF-400T
- Pentax AF-500FTZ
- Pentax AF-540FGZ
- Asahi Pentax Autorobo Auto Electronic Flash

=== Data transmission ===
Pentax offers the Pentax FluCard for adding Wireless data transmission to the DSLR cameras 645Z, K-3 and K-S1.

== Other Pentax products ==
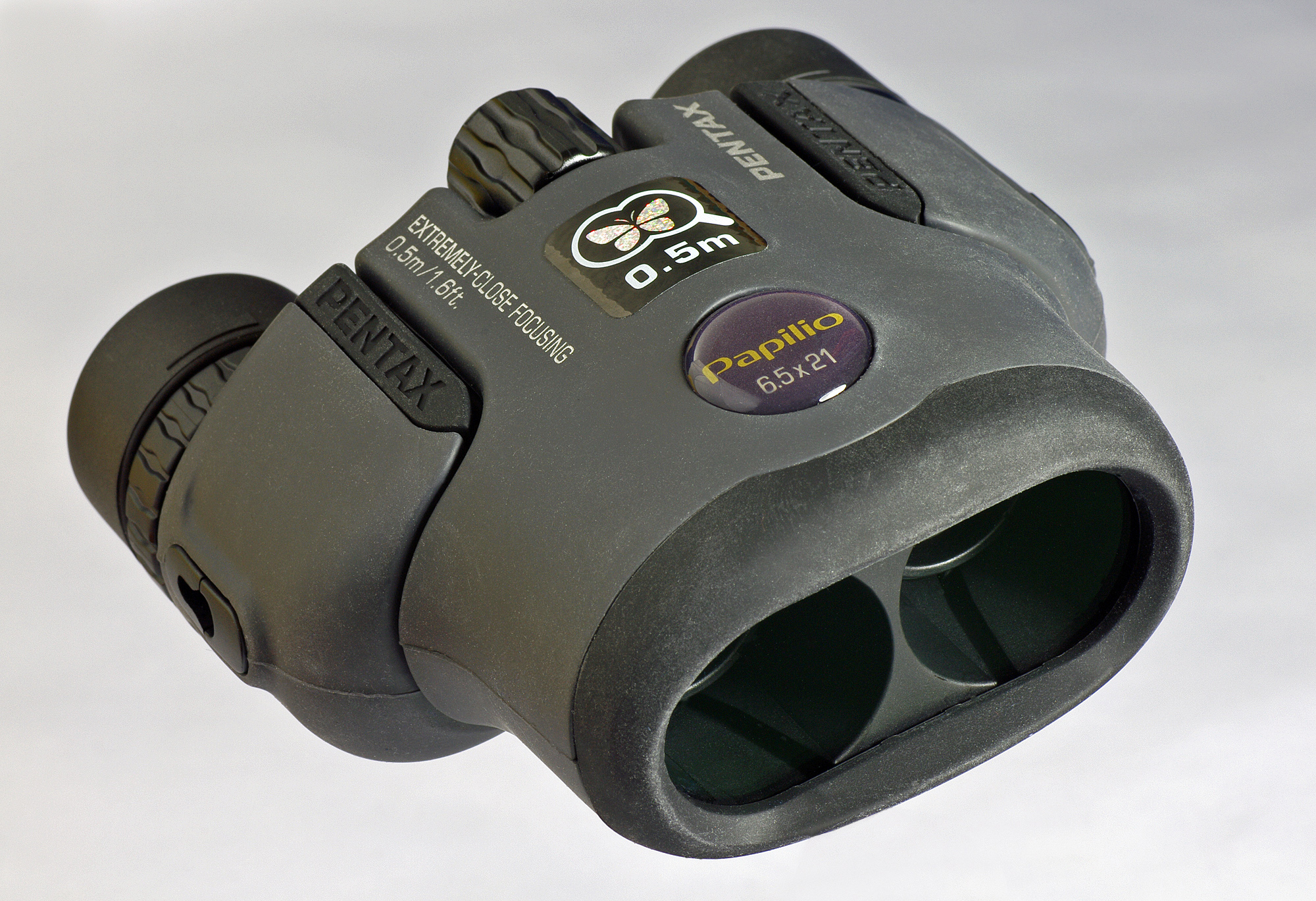
Pentax Papilio 6.5 x 21

Pentax currently makes a variety of sport optics, including binoculars.

The Pentax line of medical imaging devices was retained by Hoya Corporation when the camera business was sold to Ricoh.

The Pentax line of surveying instruments was sold to a Taiwanese company.

Type	Sensor	Class	2003	2004	2005	2006		2007	2008	2009	2010	2011	2012	2013	2014	2015	2016	2017	2018	2019	2020	2021	2022	2023	2024	2025
DSLR	MF	Professional										645D				645Z										
DSLR	FF	Professional																K-1		K-1 II						
DSLR	APS-C	High-end															K-3 II						K-3 III			
DSLR	APS-C	High-end													K-3											
DSLR	APS-C	Advanced									K-7	K-5		K-5 II / K-5 IIs												
DSLR	APS-C	Advanced		*ist D			K10D		K20D									KP								
DSLR	APS-C	Midrange					K100D	100DS	K200D					K-30	K-50			K-70						KF		
DSLR	APS-C	Entry-level			*ist DS	*ist DS2						K-r			K-500	K-S2										
DSLR	APS-C	Entry-level			*ist DL	DL2	K110D			K-m/K2000	K-x					K-S1										
MILC	APS-C	K-mount											K-01													
MILC	1/1.7"	Q-mount													Q7											
MILC	1/1.7"	Q-mount														Q-S1										
MILC	1/2.3"	Q-mount											Q	Q10												
DSLR	Prototypes		MZ-D (2000); 645D Prototype (2006); AP 50th Anniv. (2007)																							
Type	Sensor	Class																								
Type	Sensor	Class	2003	2004	2005	2006		2007	2008	2009	2010	2011	2012	2013	2014	2015	2016	2017	2018	2019	2020	2021	2022	2023	2024	2025

Type	Sensor	2011	2012	2013	2014	2015	2016	2017	2018	2019	2020	2021
K-mount	APS-C		K-01									
Q-mount	1/1.7"				Q7	Q-S1						
Q-mount	1/2.3"		Q	Q10								

Kind	Type	Focal length	Aperture	87	88	89	1990	91	92	93	94	95	96	97	98	99	2000	01	02	03	04	05	06	07	08	09	2010	11	12	13	14	15	16	17	18	19	2020	21	22	23	24	25
Prime	UWA	14	2.8																		DA 14mm f/2.8 ED AL																					
Prime	UWA	15	4.0																							DA 15mm f/4 Limited				HD DA 15mm f/4 ED AL Limited												
Prime	UWA	20	2.8									FA 20mm f/2.8 AL																														
Prime	UWA	21	2.4																																			HD D FA 21mm Limited DC				
Prime	UWA	21	3.2																				DA 21mm f/3.2 AL Limited								HD DA 21mm f/3.2 AL Limited											
Prime	WA	24	2.0					FA* 24mm f/2 AL																																		
Prime	WA	31	1.8															FA 31mm f/1.8 Limited																				HD FA 31mm 1.8 Limited				
Prime	WA	35	2.0													FA 35mm f/2 AL																				HD FA 35mm f/2 WR						
Prime	WA	35	2.4																								DA 35mm f/2.4 AL															
Prime	WA	35	2.8																							DA 35mm f/2.8 Limited Macro					HD DA 35mm f/2.8 Limited Macro											
Prime	normal	40	2.8																		DA 40mm f/2.8 Limited									HD DA 40mm f/2.8 Limited												
Prime	normal	40	2.8																										DA 40mm f/2.8 XS													
Prime	normal	43	1.9											FA 43mm f/1.9 Limited																								HD FA 43mm 1.9 Limited				
Prime	normal	50	1.4	F 50mm f/1.4				FA 50mm f/1.4																																Classic		
Prime	normal	50	1.4																																					HD FA		
Prime	normal	50	1.4																																HD FA* 50 f/1.4 SDM AW							
Prime	normal	50	1.8																										DA 50mm f/1.8 AL													
Prime	normal	50	2.8		F 50 Macro		FA 50mm f/2.8 Macro															D FA 50mm f/2.8 Macro																				
Prime	normal	55	1.4																						DA* 55mm f/1.4 SDM																	
Prime	Short Tele	70	2.4																				DA 70mm f/2.4 Limited								HD DA 70mm f/2.4 Limited											
Prime	Short Tele	77	1.8													FA 77mm f/1.8 Limited																						HD FA 77mm 1.8 Limited				
Prime	Short Tele	85	1.4						FA* 85mm f/1.4																													HD D FA* 85mm 1.4 SDM AW				
Prime	Tele	100	2.8	F 100mm f/2.8 Macro				FA 100mm f/2.8 Macro													D FA 100mm f/2.8 Macro					D FA 2.8 Macro Macro WR														HD D FA AW		
Prime	Tele	135	2.8	F 135mm 2.8					FA 135mm 2.8																																	
Prime	Tele	200	2.8							FA* 200mm f/2.8 ED															DA* 200mm f/2.8 SDM																	
Prime	4.0	200														FA* 200mm f/4 Macro ED																										
Prime	Super tele	300	2.8								FA* 300mm f/2.8 ED																															
Prime	Super tele	300	4.x	F* 300mm f/4.5 ED				FA* 300mm f/4.5 ED																	DA* 300mm f/4 SDM																	
Prime	Super tele	400	5.6											FA* 400mm f/5.6 ED																												
Prime	Ultra tele	560	5.6																										HD DA 560mm f/5.6 ED AW													
Prime	Ultra tele	600	4.0		F* 600mm f/4 ED			FA* 600mm f/4 ED																																		
Zoom	Fisheye		3.5-4.5									F 17-28mm f/3.5-4.5 Fish-Eye														DA 10-17mm f/3.5-4.5 Fish-Eye											HD DA 10-17mm 3.5-4.5 Fish-Eye					
Zoom	UWA	11-18	2.8																																	HD DA* 11-18 f/2.8 ED DC AW						
Zoom	UWA	12-24	4.0																			DA 12-24mm f/4 ED AL																				
Zoom	UWA	15-30	2.8																														D FA 15-30mm f/2.8 ED SDM WR									
Zoom	UWA	20-35	4.0												FA 20-40mm f/4 AL																											
Zoom	WA	16-45	4.0																	DA 16-45mm 4 ED AL																						
Zoom	WA	16-50	2.8																					DA* 16-50mm f/2.8 ED AL SDM														HD DA* 2.8 ED PLM AW				
Zoom	WA	16-85	3.5-5.6																												HD DA 16-85mm f/3.5-5.6 ED DC WR											
Zoom	WA	18-50	4-5.6																													HD DA 18-50 f/4-5.6 DC WR RE										
Zoom	WA	18-135	3.5-5.6																								DA 18-135mm f/3.5-5.6 ED AL DC WR															
Zoom	WA	20-40	2.8-4																												HD DA 20-40mm f/2.8-4 Limited DC WR											
Zoom	WA	24-50	4.0	F 24-50mm f/4																																						
Zoom	WA	24/28-70	2.8								FA* 28-70mm f/2.8 AL																						D FA 24-70mm f/2.8									
Zoom	Univ.	28-80	3.5-4.7					FA 28-80 f/3.5-4.7																																		
Zoom	Univ.	28-105	3.5/4-5.6						FA 28-105 f/4-5.6																									D FA 28-105 f/3.5-5.6 ED DC WR								
Zoom	Tele	50-135	2.8																					DA* 50-135mm f/2.8 ED SDM																		
Zoom	Tele	50-200	4-5.6																			DA 50-200mm f/4-5.6 ED				DA 50-200mm f/4-5.8 ED WR																
Zoom	Tele	55-300	4-5.8																						DA 55-300mm f/4-5.8 ED					DA 55-300mm f/4-5.8 ED WR												
Zoom	Tele	55-300	4.5-6.3																														HD DA 55-300mm f/4.5-6.3 ED PLM WR RE									
Zoom	Tele	60-250	4.0																						DA* 60-250mm f/4 ED SDM																	
Zoom	Tele	70/80-2x0	2.8								FA* 80-200mm f/2.8 ED																						HD D FA* 70-200mm f/2.8 ED DC AW									
Zoom	Tele	70/80-2x0	4.0																																		HD D FA 70-210 4 ED SDM WR					
Zoom	Tele	70/80-2x0	4-5.6	F 70-210mm f/4-5.6							FA 70-200mm f/4-5.6 ED																															
Zoom	Tele	100-300	4.5-5.6						FA 100-300mm f/4.5-5.6																																	
Zoom	Tele	150-450	4.5-5.6																														D FA 150-450mm f/4.5-5.6 ED DC AW									
Zoom	Tele	250-600	5.6		F* 250-600 ED			FA* 250-600 f/5.6 ED																																		
Teleconverter				F 1.7X AF																											HD DA 1.4X AW											
Kind	Type	Focal length	Aperture	87	88	89	1990	91	92	93	94	95	96	97	98	99	2000	01	02	03	04	05	06	07	08	09	2010	11	12	13	14	15	16	17	18	19	2020	21	22	23	24	25
