= X90 =

X90 may refer to

Car models

- Proton X90
- Jetour X90
- Suzuki X-90
- X90, the Toyota Cresta model from 1992 to 1996
- X90, the Toyota Mark II model sold in Japan from 1992 to 1996

Bus routes

- X90, an Oxford to London coach route, England
- X90 (New York City bus)

Other

- Pentax X90, predecessor to the Pentax X-5 camera
- Vivo X90, smartphone by Vivo
