= Pentax MG =

35mm single-lens reflex camera

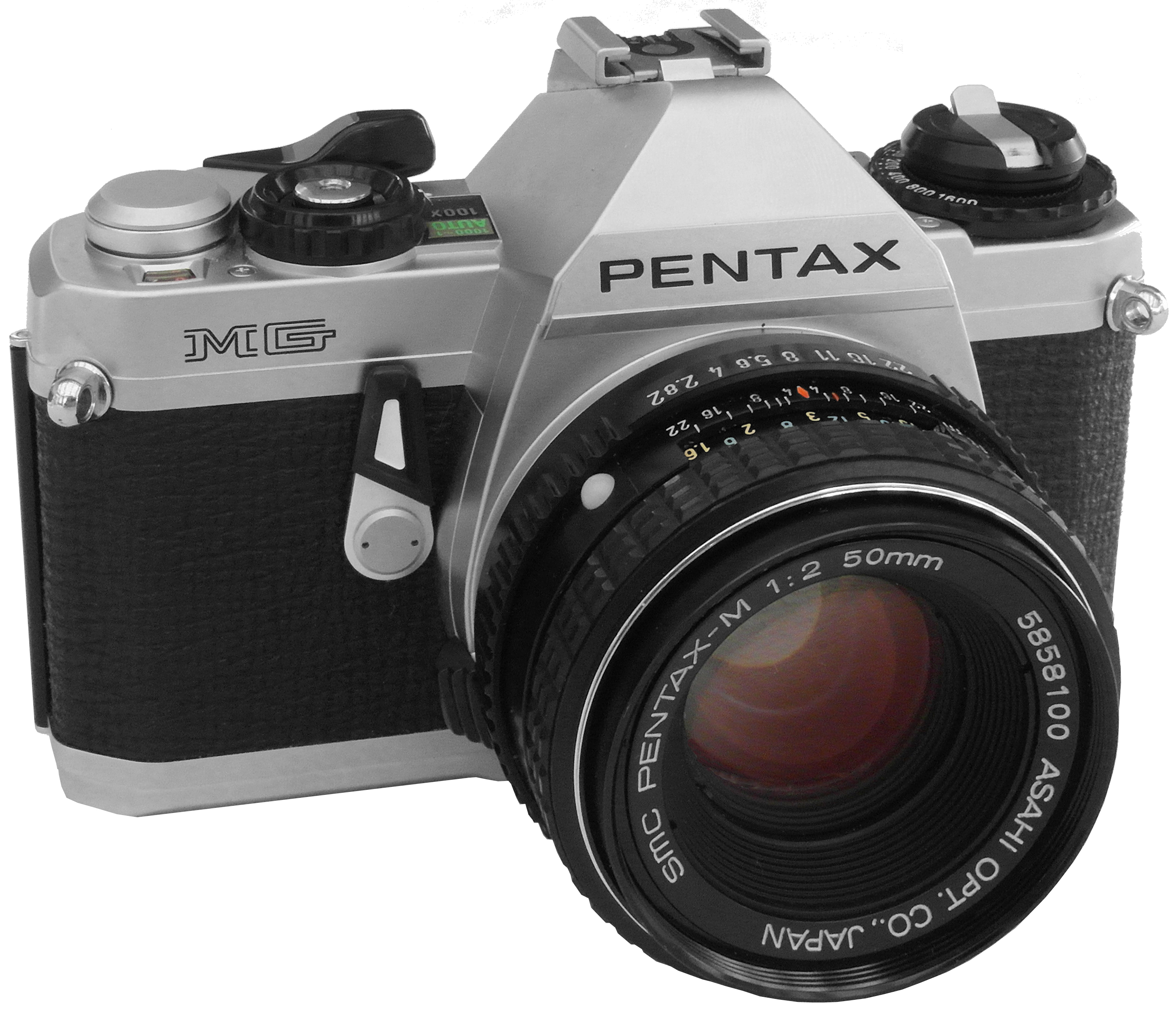
- Chrome-finish Pentax MG with an SMC Pentax-M 50/2 lens

Overview
- Maker: Asahi Optical Co., Ltd.
- Type: 35 mm SLR
- Production: 1981–1985

Lens
- Lens mount: Pentax K bayonet mount

Focusing
- Focus: Manual focus

Flash
- Flash: Hot shoe

General
- Battery: 2 x 1.5V (SR44/LR44 or equivalent)
- Made in: Japan, Hong Kong, China

Chronology
- Predecessor: Pentax MV, MV1
- Successor: Pentax A3; Pentax P3

The Pentax MG is an entry-level, interchangeable lens, 35mm film, single-lens reflex (SLR) camera manufactured by Asahi Optical Co., Ltd. from 1981 to 1985. It was introduced as the successor to the Pentax MV and MV1 cameras.

== Description ==
The Pentax MG is a manual focus, aperture priority camera. It has an electronic focal-plane shutter from 1s to 1/1000, synchronized at 1/100. If the batteries fail, the camera can still be operated at a shutter speed of 1/100 or bulb. The exposure meter is center-weighted TTL type. The lenses are interchangeable with the Pentax K bayonet mount. Other features include a self-timer and a hot shoe with an additional contact for dedicated Pentax flash units. Battery power is provided by 2x LR-44/SR-44 cells (or equivalent).

The MG has a 0.87x viewfinder, covering 92% of the field. The finder screen is fixed, with a split image and a microprism ring in the centre. The shutter speed chosen by the camera is displayed in the finder by LEDs, with red indicating over/under exposure and green indicating that the camera has selected an adequate speed for hand-held shooting. The camera also has exposure compensation from +2 to -2 EV.

The body shares a resemblance with the wider M-Family of cameras such as the ME, MX and MV. As such, it is compatible with the external Winder ME (1.5 frame/s) or the later Winder ME II (2 frame/s). The Pentax MG is capable of using the Dial Data ME databack with an adapter to slide in to the hot shoe, or it can make direct use of the Digital Data M databack.

The Pentax MG was available in chrome or black finish.

== See also ==
- List of Pentax products

Class	1970s										1980s										1990s										2000s									
Class	0	1	2	3	4	5	6	7	8	9	0	1	2	3	4	5	6	7	8	9	0	1	2	3	4	5	6	7	8	9	0	1	2	3	4	5	6	7	8	9
Flagship																						PZ-1 (Z-1)			PZ-1p (Z-1p)							MZ-S								
Flagship																									PZ-5p (Z-5p)															
Flagship											LX																													
Flagship							MX																																	
Flagship						K2 DMD																																		
Flagship						K2																																		
Midrange																		SFX (SF-1)			SFXn (SF-1n)							MZ-3 (ZX-3)				MZ-6 (ZX-L, MZ-L)								
Midrange																	P5 (P50)									MZ-5 (ZX-5)		MZ-5n (ZX-5n)												
Midrange														Super-A (Super Program)										PZ-20p (Z-20p)						MZ-7 (ZX-7)										
Midrange														Program-A (Program Plus)										Z-50p				MZ-50 (ZX-50)			MZ-30 (ZX-30)		MZ-60 (ZX-60)							
Midrange						KX						ME F														PZ-70p (Z-70p)														
Midrange							ME			ME Super																														
Entry-level																			SF7 (SF10)								MZ-10 (ZX-10)							*ist						
Entry-level																							PZ-20 (Z-20)			PZ-70 (Z-70)														
Entry-level																						PZ-10 (Z-10)																		
Entry-level																P3 (P30)			P3n (P30n)		P3t (P30t)								MZ-M (ZX-M)											
Entry-level						KM				MV	MV 1		MG			A3 (A3000)																								
Entry-level							K1000																																	
