= Pentax ZX-50 =

35mm single-lens reflex camera

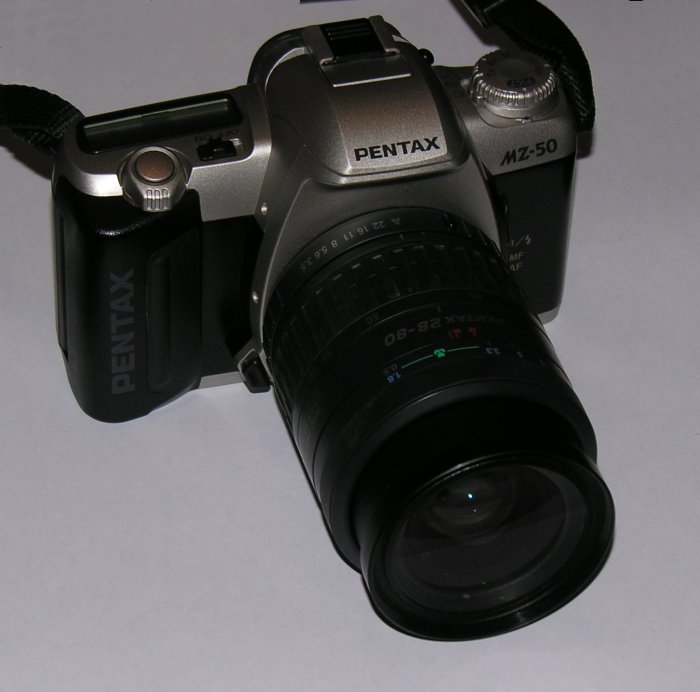
Pentax MZ-50

The Pentax ZX-50, also known as the Pentax MZ-50, is a 35mm film SLR camera.

| Class | 1970s | | | | | | | | | | 1980s | | | | | | | | | | 1990s | | | | | | | | | | 2000s | | | | | | | | | |
| Class | 0 | 1 | 2 | 3 | 4 | 5 | 6 | 7 | 8 | 9 | 0 | 1 | 2 | 3 | 4 | 5 | 6 | 7 | 8 | 9 | 0 | 1 | 2 | 3 | 4 | 5 | 6 | 7 | 8 | 9 | 0 | 1 | 2 | 3 | 4 | 5 | 6 | 7 | 8 | 9 |
| Flagship | | | | | | | | | | | | | | | | | | | | | | PZ-1 (Z-1) | | | PZ-1p (Z-1p) | | | | | | | MZ-S | | | | | | | | |
| Flagship | | | | | | | | | | | | | | | | | | | | | | | | | PZ-5p (Z-5p) | | | | | | | | | | | | | | | |
| Flagship | | | | | | | | | | | LX | | | | | | | | | | | | | | | | | | | | | | | | | | | | | |
| Flagship | | | | | | | MX | | | | | | | | | | | | | | | | | | | | | | | | | | | | | | | | | |
| Flagship | | | | | | K2 DMD | | | | | | | | | | | | | | | | | | | | | | | | | | | | | | | | | | |
| Flagship | | | | | | K2 | | | | | | | | | | | | | | | | | | | | | | | | | | | | | | | | | | |
| Midrange | | | | | | | | | | | | | | | | | | SFX (SF-1) | | | SFXn (SF-1n) | | | | | | | MZ-3 (ZX-3) | | | | MZ-6 (ZX-L, MZ-L) | | | | | | | | |
| Midrange | | | | | | | | | | | | | | | | | P5 (P50) | | | | | | | | | MZ-5 (ZX-5) | | MZ-5n (ZX-5n) | | | | | | | | | | | | |
| Midrange | | | | | | | | | | | | | | Super-A (Super Program) | | | | | | | | | | PZ-20p (Z-20p) | | | | | | MZ-7 (ZX-7) | | | | | | | | | | |
| Midrange | | | | | | | | | | | | | | Program-A (Program Plus) | | | | | | | | | | Z-50p | | | | MZ-50 (ZX-50) | | | MZ-30 (ZX-30) | | MZ-60 (ZX-60) | | | | | | | |
| Midrange | | | | | | KX | | | | | | ME F | | | | | | | | | | | | | | PZ-70p (Z-70p) | | | | | | | | | | | | | | |
| Midrange | | | | | | | ME | | | ME Super | | | | | | | | | | | | | | | | | | | | | | | | | | | | | | |
| Entry-level | | | | | | | | | | | | | | | | | | | SF7 (SF10) | | | | | | | | MZ-10 (ZX-10) | | | | | | | *ist | | | | | | |
| Entry-level | | | | | | | | | | | | | | | | | | | | | | | PZ-20 (Z-20) | | | PZ-70 (Z-70) | | | | | | | | | | | | | | |
| Entry-level | | | | | | | | | | | | | | | | | | | | | | PZ-10 (Z-10) | | | | | | | | | | | | | | | | | | |
| Entry-level | | | | | | | | | | | | | | | | P3 (P30) | | | P3n (P30n) | | P3t (P30t) | | | | | | | | MZ-M (ZX-M) | | | | | | | | | | | |
| Entry-level | | | | | | KM | | | | MV | MV 1 | | MG | | | A3 (A3000) | | | | | | | | | | | | | | | | | | | | | | | | |
| Entry-level | | | | | | | K1000 | | | | | | | | | | | | | | | | | | | | | | | | | | | | | | | | | |
