= Pentax PC35AF =

35mm film camera

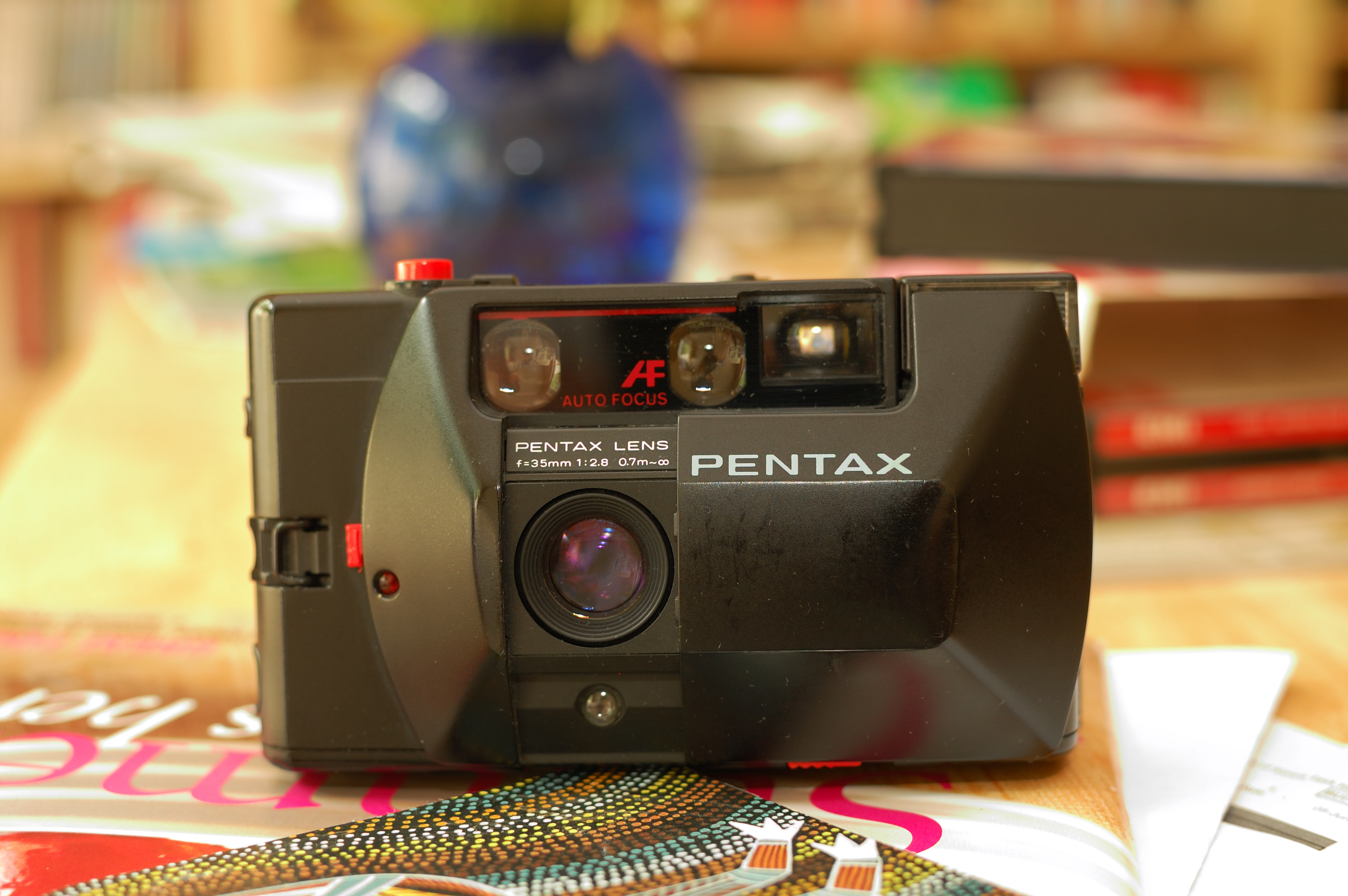

The Pentax PC35AF is a family of 35mm film point-and-shoot cameras by Pentax.

== Features ==
The camera features a self timer, flash (GN 11), automatic exposure with manual compensation of ± 1.5 EV and infrared autofocus system (minimum focusing distance 0.7 metres (2.3 ft)). The camera is powered by 2 AAA-size batteries. A winder is offered as an optional accessory.

The PC35AF-M offers an automatic film speed setting by means of the DX code (ISO 25 to 1600), with a manual setting (ISO 100, 200, 400, 1000) provided for when using film in a cartridge that lacks the DX code, and built-in winder. The camera is powered by 2 AA-size batteries.

The PC35AF-M DATE is equipped with a data-recording back that allows imprinting on the photograph of either the date (using the ymd format) or the time (using the HH mm format, ie. 24-hour clock, no seconds). The back is separately powered by two LR44 or SR44 button batteries.
