= Pentax X-5 =

Digital camera model

Overview
- Maker: Pentax
- Type: Bridge digital camera

Lens
- Lens: 4mm-104mm (22.3-580mm 35mm equivalent; 26x optical zoom) f/3.1 to f/5.9

Sensor/medium
- Sensor: 1/2.33" (6.08 x 4.56 mm) BSI-CMOS
- Maximum resolution: 4608x3456 (15.9 megapixels)
- Film speed: ISO 100-6400
- Recording medium: Secure Digital Card; SDHC; SDXC

Focusing
- Focus areas: 9 focus points

Exposure/metering
- Exposure metering: Manual

Flash
- Flash: Built-in pop up

Shutter
- Shutter: Manual
- Shutter speed range: 1/1500 sec up to 4 sec
- Continuous shooting: 10 frame/s

Viewfinder
- Viewfinder: EVF and 3.0 inch colour LCD (460,000 pixels)

General
- Battery: 4 AA batteries (alkaline, lithium, nickel, or NiMH rechargeables)
- Weight: 595 g (21 oz)

The Pentax X-5 is a digital "bridge" and superzoom camera from Japanese camera maker Pentax, featuring a 16 megapixel sensor and 26 times zoom for a final 35mm focal length equivalent of 580mm, as well as 1080p video capability. It was announced in August 2012 and became available in September 2012. The previous X-designated camera in Pentax' line-up was the Pentax X90.

The Pentax X-5 furthermore includes a tiltable LCD, uses standard AA batteries (four at a time for an estimated 330 images per battery charge) and shoots continuous images at up to 10 frames per second.

== Video modes ==
The Pentax X-5 allows recording 1080p video at 30 frames per second as well as a high-speed mode (120 frames per second, VGA, for maximum 15 seconds duration). It also has inbuilt functionality to record time-lapse video at 15 frames per second and VGA resolution (25 minutes maximum duration).

== Reception ==
DigitalCameraInfo.com says the Pentax X-5 may be "the most comfortable ultrazoom ever" (to hold), and lauds its "half-sized price tag". However, it also suggests that the X-5's image stabilisation is ineffective at longer focal lengths, and criticises the lack of controls on the lens barrel, which puts focus adjustment under automatic or camera-menu control.^{a} In closing, the reviewer requests that Pentax should "stick with that K-5 body shape no matter what".

ePhotoZine describes the camera as "stylish", and mentions the "ample rubber grips". Steve's Digicams cites "low noise up to 6400 ISO" and macro down to 0.4 inches (1 cm) as features of the camera.

== Notes ==
a. Zoom is controlled by a dedicated lever surrounding the shutter button.
