= Pentax XG-1 =

Overview
- Maker: Ricoh

Lens
- Lens: 24-1248mm equivalent
- F-numbers: f/2.8-f/5.6 at the widest

Sensor/medium
- Sensor type: BSI-CMOS
- Sensor size: 6.17 x 4.55mm (1/2.3 inch type)
- Maximum resolution: 4608 x 3456 (16 megapixels)
- Film speed: 100-3200
- Recording medium: SD or SDHC memory card

Shutter
- Shutter speeds: 1/2000s to 4s
- Continuous shooting: 9 frames per second

Image processing
- White balance: Yes

General
- LCD screen: 3 inches with 460,000 dots
- Dimensions: 119 x 89 x 98mm (4.69 x 3.5 x 3.84 inches)
- Weight: 567 g (20 oz) including battery

The Pentax XG-1 is a DSLR-like ultrazoom bridge camera announced by Pentax on July 15, 2014. At the time of its release, it had the third longest reach of any compact camera, with a maximum of 1248mm equivalent focal length, after the Nikon Coolpix P600 at 1440mm, and the Sony Cyber-shot DSC-H400 at 1550mm, both announced in February of the same year. A fourth camera, the Kodak Pixpro Astro Zoom AZ651, announced in January with a maximum focal length of 1560mm, has yet to make it to market, as of February 2015.
