= Pentax X90 =

Overview
- Maker: Pentax

Lens
- Lens: 26-676mm equivalent
- F-numbers: f/2.8-f/5.0 at the widest

Sensor/medium
- Sensor type: CCD
- Sensor size: 6.08 x 4.56mm (1/2.33 inch type)
- Maximum resolution: 4000 x 3000 (12 megapixels)
- Recording medium: SD or SDHC card; internal memory

Focusing
- Focus areas: 9 focus points

Shutter
- Shutter speeds: 1/4000s to 4s

Image processing
- Image processor: "Prime"
- White balance: Yes

General
- LCD screen: 2.7 inches with 230,000 dots
- Dimensions: 111 x 85 x 110mm (4.37 x 3.35 x 4.33 inches)
- Weight: 428 g (15 oz) including battery

The Pentax X90 is a superzoom bridge camera announced by Pentax on February 24, 2010.
