= Pentax ME F =

1981 35mm single-lens reflex camera

Pentax ME-F
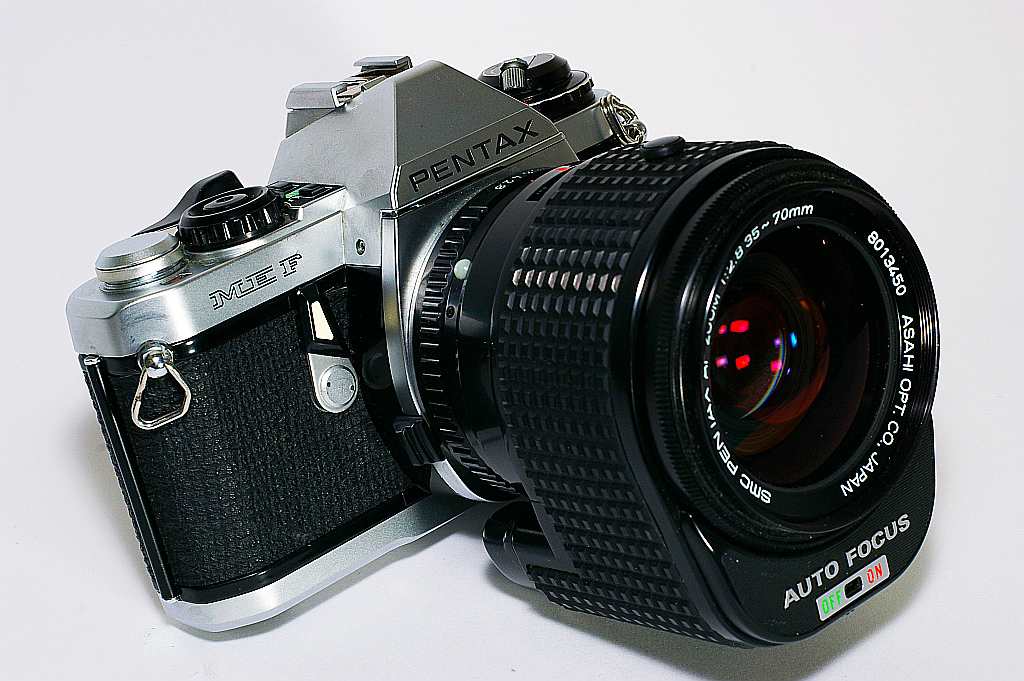
- ME F with autofocus lens

Overview
- Maker: Asahi Optical Co., Ltd.
- Type: SLR
- Production: 1981–1984

Lens
- Lens mount: Pentax K-F mount

Sensor/medium
- Recording medium: 135 film

Focusing
- Focus: Autofocus

Exposure/metering
- Exposure: Aperture priority, manual

Flash
- Flash: Hot shoe

Shutter
- Shutter speeds: 4 – 1/2000 s, Bulb

General
- Dimensions: 132×87.5×49 mm (5.20×3.44×1.93 in)
- Weight: 480 g (17 oz) (1.06 lb)

The Pentax ME F was an amateur level, interchangeable lens, 35 mm film, single-lens reflex (SLR) camera. It was manufactured by Asahi Optical Co., Ltd. of Japan from November 1981 to 1984. The ME F was a heavily modified version of the Pentax ME-Super, and a member of the Pentax M-series family of SLRs (see List of Pentax products). It was the first mass-produced SLR camera to come with an autofocus system.

== Significance and market position ==
The ME F is a historically significant camera. It was the first autofocus (AF) 35 mm SLR camera to reach production. It had a built-in through-the-lens (TTL) electronic contrast detection system to automatically determine proper subject focus and drive a lens to that focus point. Although it autofocused poorly and was a commercial failure, the pioneering ME F was a major milestone in the history of camera technology that pointed the way to all present day AF SLRs. Most new cameras today, whether film, video or digital, have some sort of autofocusing system.

Note that the ME F was not the first AF still camera, or even the first AF SLR camera, to reach consumers. Those honors go to the Konica C35 AF 35 mm point-and-shoot, with an electronic rangefinder system, of 1977 and the Polaroid SX-70 Sonar instant film SLR, with a sonar echo-ranging system, of 1978, respectively.

The 35 mm–70 mm AF Zoom was not the first autofocus lens of any kind to reach consumers. In addition to the trivial examples of the fixed lenses on the AF cameras mentioned above, interchangeable 35 mm SLR AF lenses had come out just before it from Canon, Ricoh and Chinon with self-contained non-TTL AF sensors, computer and motor.

The ME F, a heavily modified version of the Pentax ME Super of 1979, was a member of the Pentax M-series SLRs, along with the Pentax ME (1976), MX (1977), MV (1979), MV-1 (1980), and MG (1982). They all used the same basic ultra-compact aluminium alloy chassis (except for the MX, which had a different chassis but used similar styling). They differed in feature levels, internal electronics, and external controls and cosmetics. The M-series remain among the smallest and lightest full-frame 35 mm film SLRs ever made.

The introductory list price for the ME F body only (no lens) was $402 in the United States. The ME F with SMC Pentax AF 35mm-70mm f/2.8 Zoom Lens autofocus lens (required for autofocus operation; see below) had a list price of $994. Note that SLRs usually sold for 30 to 40 percent below list price.

== Features and operation ==
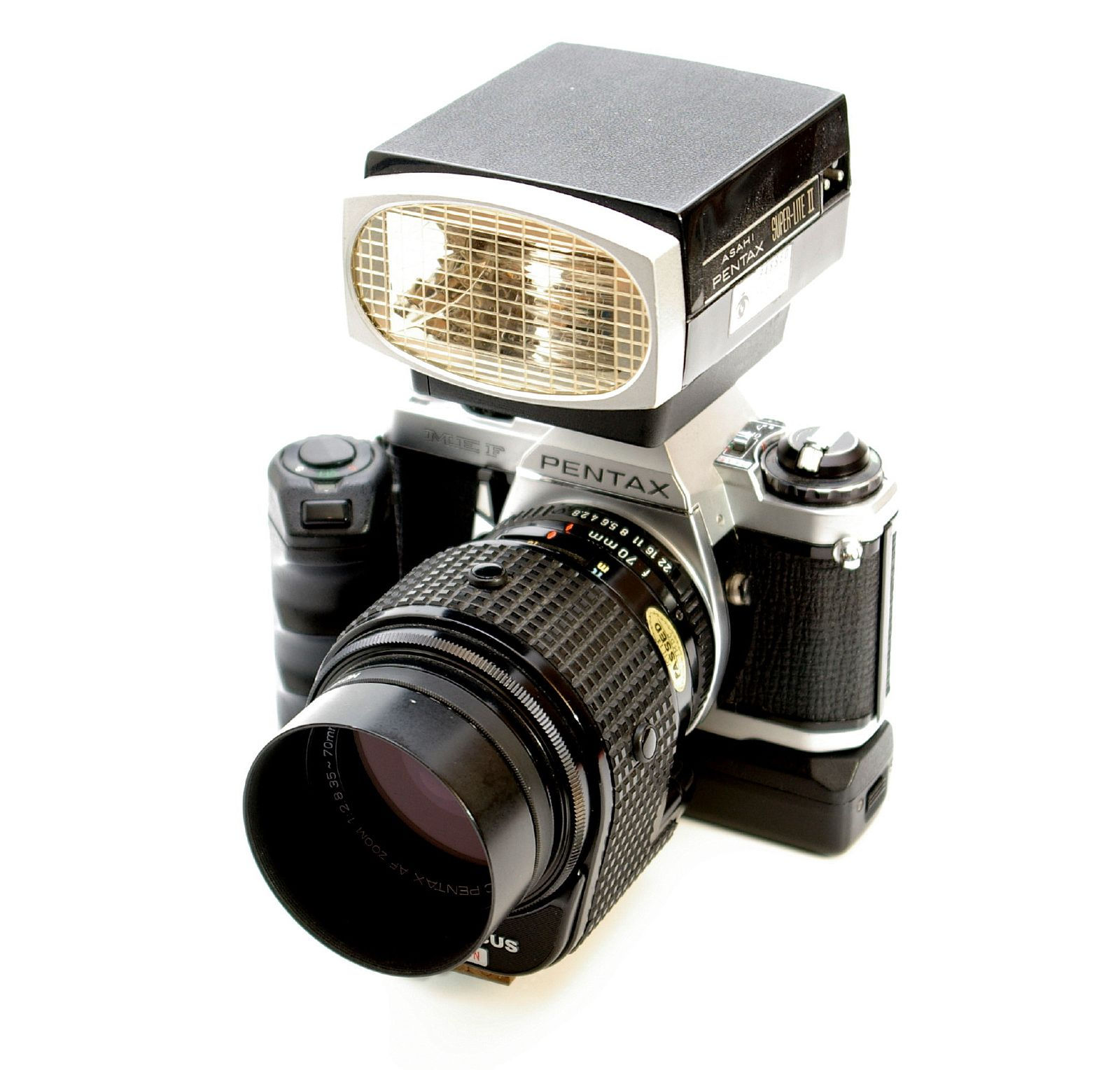
ME-F with the 35-70mm autofocus lens, auto winder and flash

The camera used a Seiko MFC-E2 vertical travel, metal bladed focal plane shutter with a speed range of 4 to 1/2000th second plus Bulb and flash X-sync of 1/125th second. It was 87.5 millimetres (3.44 in) high, 132 millimetres (5.2 in) wide, 49 millimetres (1.9 in) deep and weighed 480 grams (1.06 lb). It was finished in satin crome or black. Although the ME F was an interchangeable lens camera (the photographer could remove and exchange its lens for another), its AF function required the unique SMC Pentax AF 35 mm–70 mm f/2.8 Zoom Lens autofocus lens using a special Pentax K-F lens mount. Unlike all later Pentax AF SLRs, the ME F did not have the focusing drive motor and keying shaft built into the camera body. The drive motor was in the lens instead. This lens also had a bulky underslung battery compartment that held four 1.5 Volt AAA alkaline batteries (1.2 Volt rechargeables not compatible) to power the motor. It had 7 elements in 7 groups, was 76.5 mm long, 73 mm in diameter, 87 mm high through the battery compartment, weighed 580 g, had a minimum focusing distance of 1.2 m and was threaded for 58 mm accessories. This lens was also one of the earliest attempts to supersede the heretofore standard 50 mm "normal" lens with today's ubiquitous zoom lens.

The Pentax K-F mount added five electrical contact pins protruding through the lens mount flange at the 5 o'clock position (when viewing the ME F body from the front) to the original Pentax K mount (introduced 1975) to pass focus control information between the camera and the lens. The Pentax K-AF and K-AF2 autofocus lens mounts (introduced 1987 and 1991, respectively) have contacts of different number, position and function, and therefore the 35mm-70mm AF Zoom cannot autofocus on any other Pentax SLR.

Almost all other Pentax K mount bayonet lenses will function properly under manual focusing, with the AF system providing focus indication – Asahi Optical called this TTL Electronic Focus. This includes lenses with the Pentax K-A mount (introduced 1983) and the K-AF/AF2 mounts. However, the newest SMC-Pentax FA J (1997) and SMC-Pentax DA (2004) types, lacking an aperture control ring, have severely restricted functionality. There were over thirty contemporary manual focus Asahi Optical made lenses of the SMC Pentax-M and SMC Pentax-A types.

The ME F had its autofocus sensor inside the bottom of the mirror box. Twenty-five percent of the light from the lens' central image was siphoned through a semi-transparent reflex mirror and reflected off a piggy-backed secondary mirror to the AF module. In the module, beam splitter mirrors sent the light to fall on a two row, segmented, linear metal oxide semiconductor (MOS) silicon sensor. A microcomputer analyzed the sensor's subject contrast readings. Modern AF SLRs use similar, though much evolved, AF hardware; however, their AF software no longer analyze contrast.

To autofocus, the AF function had to be switched ON on both the ME F and 35 mm–70 mm AF Zoom lens. When the photographer pressed either of two AF buttons on the barrel of the lens, the computer would signal the lens' motor to turn the lens' focusing helical until it sensed equal contrast between the sensor's two rows. This meant that each row was reading the subject as equally out of focus. Since one row was mounted slightly in front of the film plane, while the other was an equal distance behind, this equated to highest subject contrast in between the rows and a sharp, in-focus subject on the film. The lens would stop turning and the camera would sound a (cancelable) beeper.

Focus indication also came in the form of a green hexagonal in-focus light-emitting diode (LED) flanked by two red arrowhead shaped, out-of-focus, turning direction LED indicators visible at the bottom of the viewfinder. If both red LEDs lit, the ME F could not determine correct focus. In that case, the 35mm-70mm lens had a backup manual focus ring.

These LEDs were also used for TTL Electronic Focus assisted manual focus. After lightly pressing the shutter button, the photographer would turn Pentax brand manual focus lenses in the direction of whichever red arrow LED lit until the green LED lit to indicate sharp focus. Again, if both red LEDs lit, the ME F could not determine correct focus. Note that many independent manufacturer K mount lenses focus by turning in the opposite direction of Asahi Optical made lenses and that the focus direction LEDs will point the "wrong" way for them.

Except for the AF system, the ME F was very similar to the ME Super: an almost all metal, electromechanically (much electronics, but many springs, gears and levers) controlled manual focus SLR with manual exposure control or aperture priority autoexposure. The ME F required four 1.5 Volt S76 or SR44 silver oxide batteries (two more than the ME Super; alkaline not recommended; 3 Volt lithium not compatible) to power its electronically controlled shutter and autofocus system.

The batteries also powered the ME F's exposure control system. This system lit LEDs alongside a vertical shutter speed scale on the left side of the viewfinder. In aperture priority mode, a steadily lit LED indicated the shutter speed automatically set by the electronic microprocessor in response to the light reaching the built-in, open aperture, through-the-lens (TTL), centre-weighted gallium arsenide phosphide photodiode (GPD) light meter and the set lens aperture. The LEDs for the speeds between 1/2000th and 1/60th second were green, while those for 1/30th to 4 seconds were yellow to warn of possible picture blur at the slower speeds. A steadily lit red OVER or UNDER LED came on if the scene was out of the meter's exposure range.

In manual mode, a green M LED came on. The OVER or UNDER LED would blink to indicate the exposure adjustment recommended by the meter, while a steadily lit LED showed the actual camera set shutter speed. The photographer would adjust the shutter speed and/or the lens aperture f-stop until the OVER or UNDER LED went out. Unlike most other SLRs of the era, the ME F used two push buttons to increase or decrease shutter speeds instead of the traditional dial and this LED scale is the only display of the set shutter speed. What appeared to be a shutter speed dial on autoexposure M-series SLRs was actually the exposure mode dial: AUTO meant aperture priority and M was for manual.

Note that exposure control was initiated by lightly pressing the shutter release button — separate from AF initiation. This made control of the ME F a two-step, two-handed operation. Asahi Optical recommended left hand AF first, then right hand metering.

The viewfinder also had a fixed focusing screen with Asahi Optical's standard split image rangefinder and microprism collar manual focusing aids. The split image rangefinder was a good indication of the width of the AF sensor field of view.

Major accessories for the ME F included the Pentax Winder ME II autowinder (automatic film advance up to 2 frames per second), Pentax Dial Data ME databack (date stamping on the film), and the Pentax AF 200S (guide number 66/20 (feet/meters) at ASA 100) and AF 280T (guide number 90/28 (feet/meters) at ASA 100) electronic flashes.

Although the ME F was a highly electronic camera normally dependent on battery power, it had a backup ability to operate without batteries, though in a very limited fashion: completely manual mechanical control with two shutter speeds (1/125th second, marked 125X, and Bulb; both accessed from the mode dial) and without the light meter or AF. This ability was shared with other ME-series cameras.

== Design history ==
The 1970s and 1980s were an era of intense competition between the major SLR brands: Pentax, Nikon, Canon, Minolta and Olympus. Between circa 1975 to 1985, there was a dramatic shift away from heavy all-metal manual mechanical camera bodies to much more compact camera bodies modularly built with substantial amounts of lightweight plastics. In addition, because of rapid advances in electronics, the brands continually leap frogged each other with models having new or more automatic features. The introduction of integrated circuit (IC) microprocessors made it easy for SLRs to provide convenience features like electronically timed shutters, electronic autoexposure, electronic information displays (using LEDs or LCDs) and use electronic computer calculated zoom lenses. The industry was trying to expand out from the saturated high-end professional and advanced amateur market and appeal to the large mass of low-end amateur photographers itching to move up from compact automatic leaf shutter rangefinder (RF) cameras to the more versatile and glamorous SLR but were intimidated by the need to learn all the gritty details of operating a traditional SLR.

Asahi Optical was an early and enthusiastic participant in this competition. The Asahi Pentax Electro Spotmatic (Honeywell Pentax Spotmatic ES in the USA) of 1971 was the first 35 mm SLR with electronic aperture priority autoexposure and the Pentax ME was the first electronic autoexposure-only 35 mm SLR. Asahi Optical was also the first company to offer publicly available anti-reflection multicoated photographic lenses with their SMC Takumar lenses in 1971.

By 1981, almost every part of the classic mount lens/load film/compose/focus/meter/f-stop/shutter speed/shoot/wind sequence of SLR operation could be automated – although no single production SLR or even single brand of SLRs possessed all existing features. Even the normally complex control of flash exposure for auxiliary light in dim situations had been completely automated. Automatic focusing was the one major feature missing.

The ME F represented a major advance in camera technology. It and the other first generation autofocus or focus indication 35 mm SLRs (such as the Canon AL-1 of 1982, the 1983 Olympus OM-30 (called the Olympus OM-F in the USA), or the Nikon F3 AF, also of 1983) were the beginning of a dominant breed of camera.

However, none of these cameras were commercial successes as AF technology was in its infancy in 1981. The ME F (and its ilk) could be expected to autofocus only under near-ideal conditions – brightly lit, high-contrast, well-centred and stationary subjects – that could be manually focused with ease. In more typical conditions, the ME F would focus imprecisely, or simply fail to focus. Instead, it might continuously but hopelessly turn its lens; "hunting" in vain for proper focus but succeeding in wasting limited battery power. In addition, since the ME F was compatible with only one autofocus lens, its flexibility as an interchangeable lens camera was almost negated. Photographers saw the ME F as little more than a curiosity, not worth its initial 50% price premium over the equivalent manual focus ME Super.

The selling price of the ME F crashed by a third in early 1983 as photographers made it obvious that the time for autofocus had not yet come and dealers scrambled to clear out stock. Asahi Optical turned away from AF and came out with the Pentax Super-A (Super Program in the USA), a less radical SLR also built upon the M-series chassis, but offering the much more mainstream features of programmed autoexposure and TTL autoflash, in mid-1983. The Super-A broke the tradition of being capable of batteryless operation. The ME F was quietly dropped from the Pentax lineup in 1984.

It would not be until the introduction of the landmark Minolta Maxxum 7000 (Alpha 7000 in Japan) in 1985, with its superior and better integrated phase comparison AF system and far wider lens and accessory selection, that autofocusing captured the 35 mm SLR buying public's imagination and the AF SLR camera revolution truly began. Asahi Optical's second AF SLR, the Pentax SFX (SF1 in the USA), introduced in 1987, owed its configuration more to the Maxxum than to the ME F; one that modern Pentax (and Samsung) digital SLRs continue to use today.

== See also ==
- List of Pentax products

Class	1970s										1980s										1990s										2000s									
Class	0	1	2	3	4	5	6	7	8	9	0	1	2	3	4	5	6	7	8	9	0	1	2	3	4	5	6	7	8	9	0	1	2	3	4	5	6	7	8	9
Flagship																						PZ-1 (Z-1)			PZ-1p (Z-1p)							MZ-S								
Flagship																									PZ-5p (Z-5p)															
Flagship											LX																													
Flagship							MX																																	
Flagship						K2 DMD																																		
Flagship						K2																																		
Midrange																		SFX (SF-1)			SFXn (SF-1n)							MZ-3 (ZX-3)				MZ-6 (ZX-L, MZ-L)								
Midrange																	P5 (P50)									MZ-5 (ZX-5)		MZ-5n (ZX-5n)												
Midrange														Super-A (Super Program)										PZ-20p (Z-20p)						MZ-7 (ZX-7)										
Midrange														Program-A (Program Plus)										Z-50p				MZ-50 (ZX-50)			MZ-30 (ZX-30)		MZ-60 (ZX-60)							
Midrange						KX						ME F														PZ-70p (Z-70p)														
Midrange							ME			ME Super																														
Entry-level																			SF7 (SF10)								MZ-10 (ZX-10)							*ist						
Entry-level																							PZ-20 (Z-20)			PZ-70 (Z-70)														
Entry-level																						PZ-10 (Z-10)																		
Entry-level																P3 (P30)			P3n (P30n)		P3t (P30t)								MZ-M (ZX-M)											
Entry-level						KM				MV	MV 1		MG			A3 (A3000)																								
Entry-level							K1000																																	
