= Pentax LX =

1980 model of camera

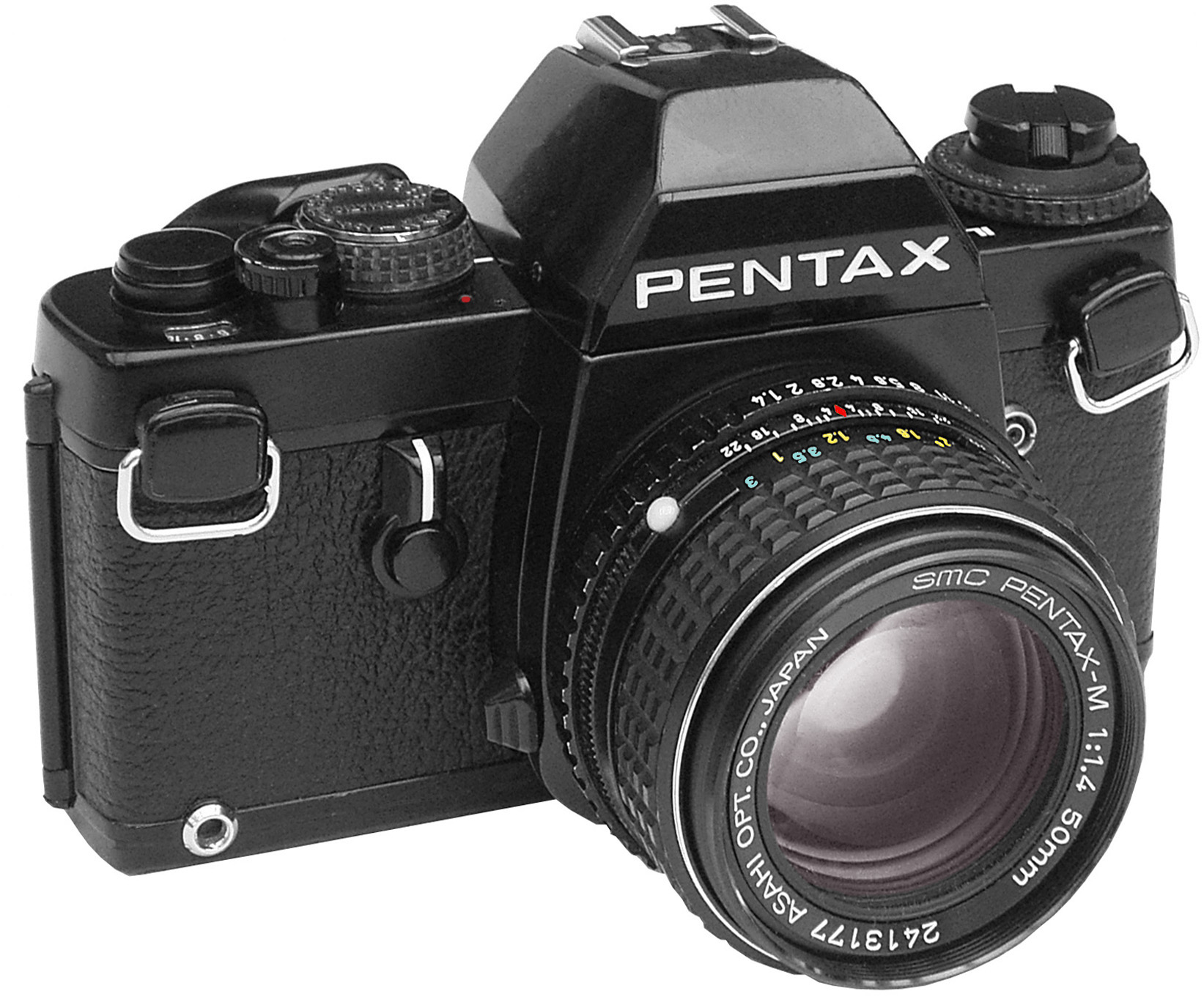
- Pentax LX with 50 mm f/1.4 lens

Overview
- Maker: Pentax
- Type: 35mm single-lens reflex (SLR)
- Released: 1980
- Production: 1980–2001

Lens
- Lens mount: Pentax K
- Lens: Interchangeable lens

Sensor/medium
- Film format: 35mm
- Film speed: 6-3200 ISO
- Film advance: manual; automatic with motor drive
- Film rewind: manual; automatic with motor drive

Focusing
- Focus: Manual

Exposure/metering
- Exposure modes: Aperture priority (A_{v}), Manual (M), Bulb (B)
- Exposure metering: Off-the-film (OTF) TTL

Flash
- Flash: Hot shoe, PC socket
- Flash synchronization: 1/75s, variable with dedicated flash

Shutter
- Frame rate: 2 fps with winder, 5 fps with motor drive
- Shutter: Horizontal-running titanium shutter, mechanical or electronic operation
- Shutter speed range: 1/2000 ~ 4s (manual), 1/2000 ~ 125s (automatic)

Viewfinder
- Viewfinder: Interchangeable eye-level pentaprism viewfinder

General
- Battery: 2×SR44 or 1×CR11108
- Body features: Fully weather and dust-sealed
- Dimensions: 144.5×90.5×50 mm (5.69×3.56×1.97 in) with standard FA-1 finder
- Weight: 570 g (20 oz) (1.26 lb)
- Made in: Japan

The Pentax LX is a professional 35mm single-lens reflex camera produced by Pentax in Japan. It was introduced in 1980 to commemorate the 60th anniversary of Asahi Optical Co. (hence the Roman numerals LX), and was produced until 2001. It is the top-of-the-line professional, or "system", camera in the Pentax manual focus range, with manual and aperture priority automatic exposure modes and an advanced light metering system. The LX uses the K mount, which is the Pentax proprietary bayonet lens mount, and has a large body of accessories. The camera has several unique or uncommon features, and compared with contemporary professional camera bodies from rival manufacturers, like the Canon New F-1 or Nikon F3, the LX body is smaller and lighter, weighing in at 570 grams (1.26 pounds) (Note: Compared with 795 grams and 700 grams for the Canon New F-1 and Nikon F3 camera bodies, respectively.) with its standard FA-1 finder.

Due to the peculiar font used for the Pentax LX logo, the model is sometimes misspelled as 'ILX'.

== Construction and features ==
Pentax LX logo, on top deck next to rewind knob

The LX is constructed of a solid metal alloy cast frame and metal covering plates, intended to be more durable than entry-level and mid-range cameras. Underneath the satin black finish is black chrome, meant to avoid a brassy look on the underlying metal as the surface finish wore through from use. All buttons and dials are fully weather and dust sealed, the LX being the first camera to have this feature, even among professional-grade contemporaries. This weather sealing made it suitable for photography in mechanically-difficult coastal environments with salt in the air.

The camera has an uncommon frame counter, being able to keep track of the frame number in either direction, whether advancing or rewinding the film. This feature aids in taking "random-access" multiple exposures anywhere along the film strip, as the counter only advances when the film does. (Note: In contrast to those of other cameras, including the Nikon F3 and Canon New F-1, which advance each time the shutter is cocked.) The camera's self-timer lever is multi-functional, allowing for mirror lock-up and depth of field preview. The film take-up spool is of the "Magic-Needles" type, as found on the Pentax M Series cameras, which simplified loading. Both the viewfinder and focusing screen are interchangeable to suit the task at hand, with a large choice of alternatives available.

These features made the LX highly sought-after among professionals both during and after production, with prices on e-commerce sites like eBay in the range of $200 to $400.

=== Shutter and metering ===
The light metering system of the LX featured 'Off-The-Film' metering, previously patented by Olympus and unique to the Olympus OM-2 series since 1975. While heavily touted as 'new' by Pentax in 1980, the LX's OTF was largely copied from Olympus. Among Pentax' claimed refinements over the Olympus implementation, LX OTF metering extended the maximum automatic exposure time from the OM-2n's 120 seconds to 125 seconds.

The horizontally-running titanium shutter curtains are mechanically operated at all shutter speeds faster than, and including, the 1/75 second flash sync ('X') speed, and electronically for all speeds slower than it. Because the upper range is entirely mechanical, all speeds within are available without batteries in the camera, albeit without any light metering. The first shutter curtain had a reflective white dot pattern (also used in the 1974 Olympus design) visible when the shutter is cocked, which assists in the light metering process.

The film speed dial can be set from 6 to 3200 ASA, and co-axially doubles as an exposure compensation dial (used to correct exposure metering in unevenly-lit environments). Operating with a range of ±2 EV in 1/3 EV steps, the co-axial design was yet another feature found on earlier Olympus models.

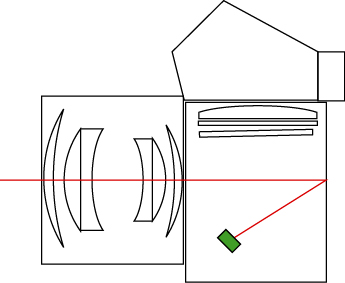
Diagram of the Integrated Direct Metering system with the mirror up

The LX metering system is branded Integrated Direct Metering (IDM), which is a dynamic aperture-priority, center-weighted metering system which measures light off-the-film-plane, through the lens. In operation, it is essentially a "refined" version of the Olympus OM-2's metering system. Pre-release exposure information is obtained from light passing through a semi-silvered area of the reflex mirror and then reflected down by a small secondary mirror to a silicon metering cell in the base of the camera—in contrast to the OM-2's need for a second cell in the viewfinder for the same task. Once the shutter is released, the light reflected off the first shutter curtain and the film itself continues to be measured by the same photocell as the exposure takes place, continuously adjusting the exposure time to match the varying light level of the subject. A shutter speed prediction is then calculated and given to the user through a vertical row of LEDs visible in the viewfinder, seen as an advance of the display row in the ME Super from 1979.

In the automatic mode, the speed indicated is only an approximation of the actual speed the camera will use, which is completely variable, a feature broadly distinct to professional auto-exposure cameras. (Note: For instance, with Pentax's own ME Super, a mid-range K-mount SLR from the year prior, shutter speeds in the automatic mode are fixed to the ones visible in the viewfinder.) The mode's exposure metering ranges from -6.5 EV to +20 EV. Shutter speeds in the automatic mode range from 1/2000 second to 125 seconds, making the camera excellent for available light photography. In contrast, the 8-second maximum of both the Nikon F3 and Canon New F-1's automatic modes make the exceptionally long exposure time only achievable with bulb photography.

In the manual mode, the predicted shutter speed is still displayed in the viewfinder as a recommendation, allowing the user to choose the speed indicated, or any other speed, by turning the shutter speed dial to align a translucent blue flag along the LED row. The blue flag, together with the aperture f-stop window, meant that manual exposure settings are still visible in the viewfinder without batteries, unlike the LCD screens seen in the F3. Shutter speeds on the dial are fixed between 1/2000 second and 4 seconds. The manual exposure metering has a range from +1 EV to +19 EV.

Like the Nikon F3 and the Canon New F-1, the viewfinders do not play a role in the metering process, since the metering is done entirely within the body of the camera. The Pentax LX functions fully with any of the interchangeable viewfinders, or even without one. Unlike either, however, as the exposure information is actually displayed on the camera body itself, the electrical contacts on the viewfinders are not necessary for showing exposure, and are instead only present in some for the hot shoe on the top. The system also removes any necessity for a viewfinder window blind, which would be necessary in other SLRs to prevent light from coming in the eyepiece and adversely affecting the exposure.

TTL flash control is also available using Pentax and certain third-party dedicated units in the hot shoe (e.g. the Pentax AF280T), which are controlled by the camera taking measurements from the IDM during the exposure. The TTL capabilities are extended to dedicated external flash units (such as the Pentax AF400T hammerhead unit) via a special lead which connects to the conventional PC socket and additional contacts adjacent to it. The hot shoe and PC socket can also be used with non-dedicated flash units.

== Interchangeable accessories ==
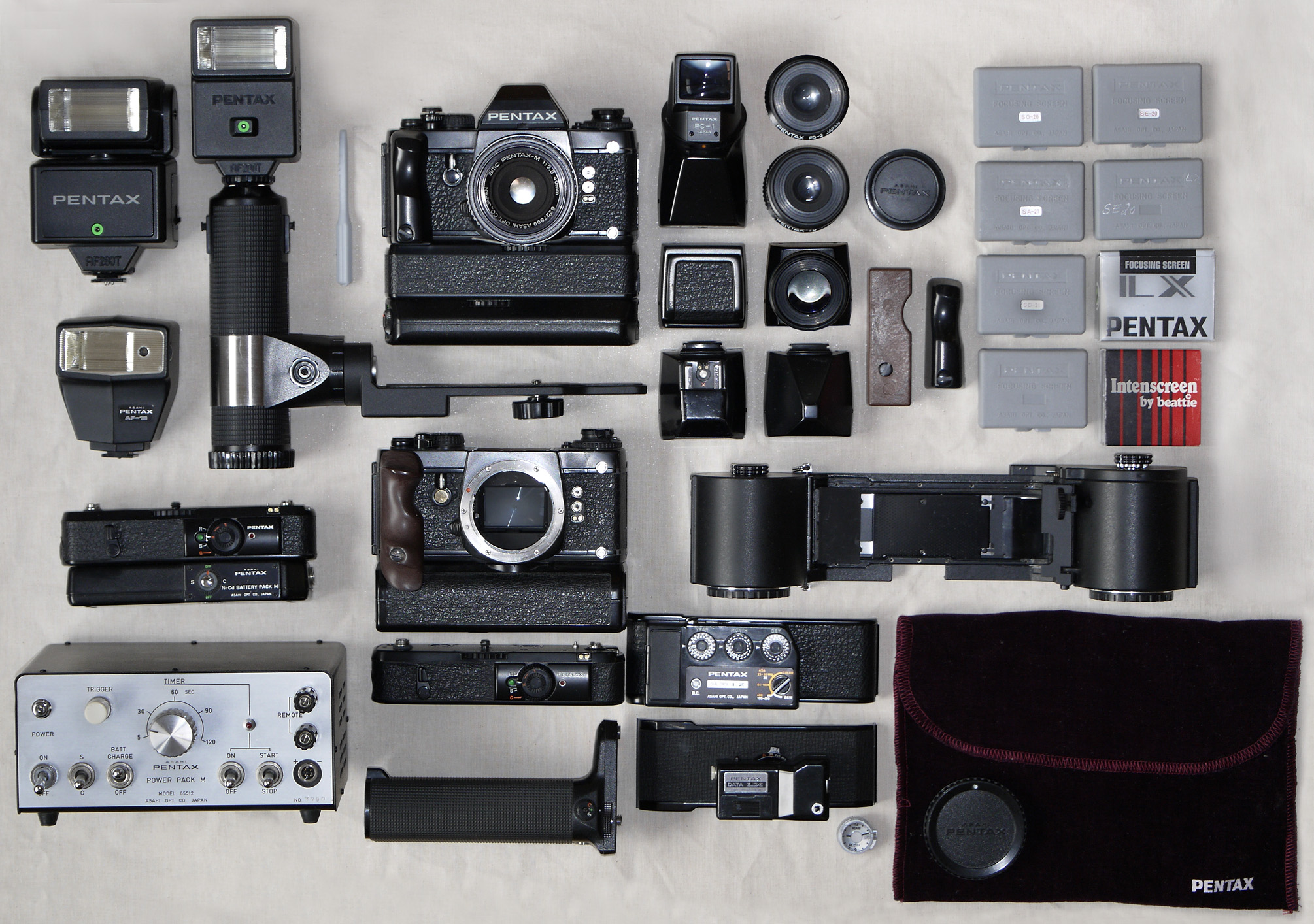
Pentax LX with available system accessories

A number of professional accessories were made available for the LX, in addition to the conventional hot shoe flashes, including interchangeable viewfinders and focusing screens, a specialized winder and motor drive, a few detachable camera backs, and other miscellaneous accessories.

=== Viewfinders ===
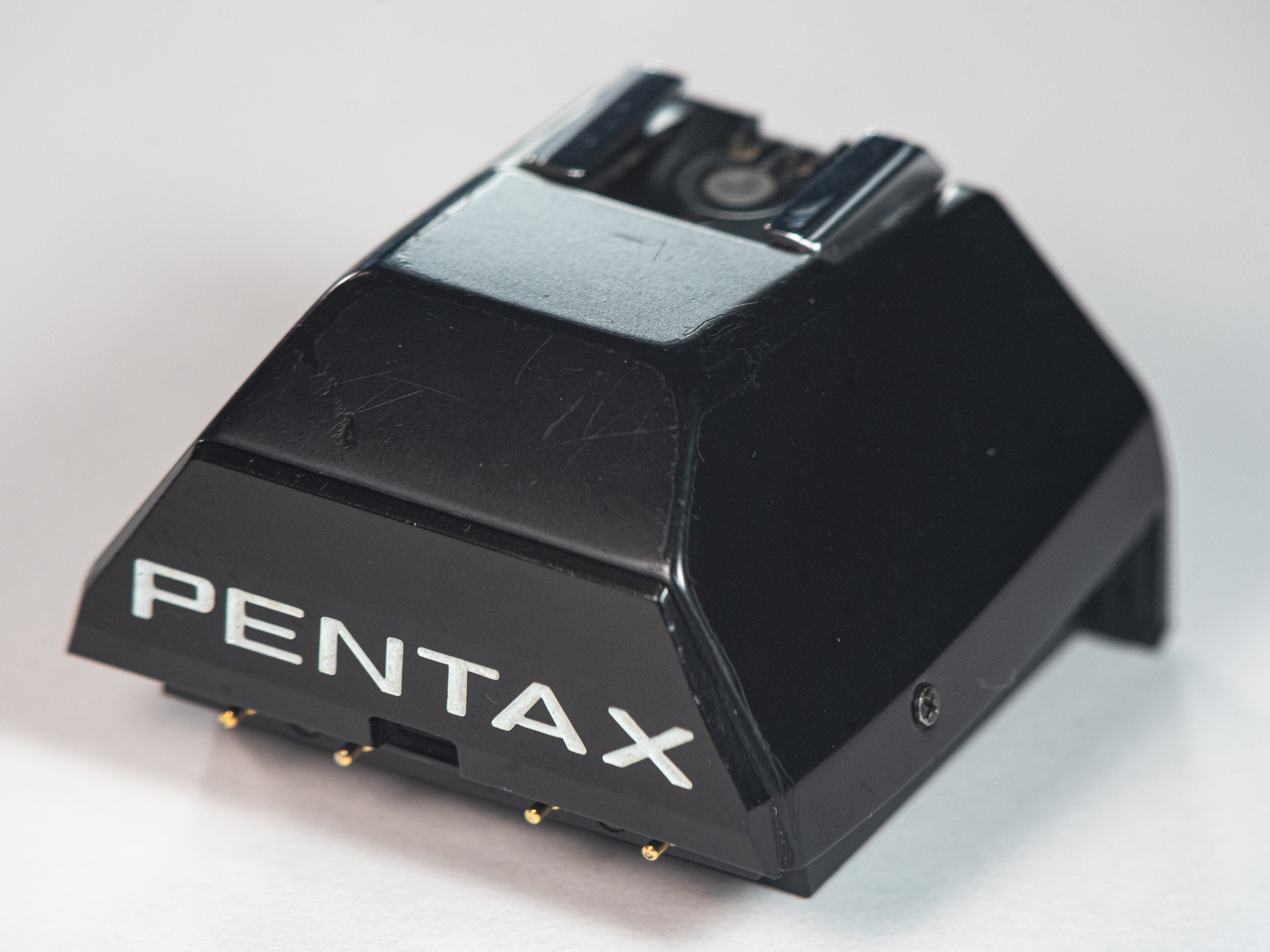
Standard FA-1 viewfinder

The LX has six interchangeable viewfinders, some of which show the lens aperture f-stop via a small window within them. The available viewfinders are:

- The standard FA-1 eye-level pentaprism finder, which has a hot shoe and built-in adjustable diopter correction from 0 to 1.5 for users with corrective lenses. The aperture f-stop is visible at the top of the finder window.
- The FA-1W eye-level pentaprism finder; the same as the FA-1, but with a diopter correction range of 1 to 3.
- The FA-2 eye-level pentaprism finder intended to be compact and lightweight; the same as the FA-1, but without the hot shoe or the f-stop window.
- The FE-1 waist-level "Magni-Finder" intended for close-up photography or situations where magnification is needed for accurate focusing. The f-stop is not visible through the viewfinder, and it has no hot shoe.
- The FF-1 waist-level finder can fold to be almost flat when not in use. There is no hot shoe, and the aperture f-stop is not visible.
- The FB-1 system finder base, which is used with any of three separate bayonet-mounted eyepieces:
  - The FC-1 action eyepiece, which can rotate 180° to provide either an eye-level view with a high eyepoint or a waist-level view.
  - The FD-1 "Magni-Eyepiece" which magnifies the view through the lens at a 45° viewing angle. The eyepiece features a diopter correction range of -4.5 to +3.5.
  - The FD-2 standard eyepiece, which has a 45° viewing angle, ideal for microscopy. Aperture f-stop is not visible in the viewfinder.

To switch viewfinders, a small lever is pushed to release the current one, allowing it to be removed and replaced with another. The task of changing can be performed with one hand. Both the LX and the Canon New F-1 use a more secure rail system to attach viewfinders, as opposed to the Nikon F3's dual latch system.

=== Focusing screens ===
The LX has a total of 17 focusing screens (originally 9 with the early model) that are specially coated to appear brighter than the screens in other cameras. The 9 focusing screens designed for the earlier Pentax MX system can also be used in the LX, as they have the same dimensions, though are not as bright. To switch focusing screens, a small "pincette", supplied with each new screen, is used to remove the current one from the focusing screen frame through the lens mount, and then to insert the new screen in its place.

The original 9 screens include:

- The standard SC-21 ground-glass focusing screen with a split-image and microprism collar center.
- SA-21, a simplified version of the SC-21 with only the microprism center (without the split-image component).
- SA-23, similar to the SA-21, but modified to aid in focusing high-speed lenses (lenses with maximum apertures wider than f/2.8).
- SB-21, a simplified version of the SC-21 without the microprism collar.
- SD-21 all-matte focusing screen with crosshairs in the center, intended for astrophotography and macrophotography.
- SD-11, similar to the SD-21 but with a clear background.
- SE-20 all-matte focusing screen intended for use with macro and telephoto lenses.
- SG-20, similar to the SE-20 but with an etched 6mm grid pattern intended for aligning architectural subjects or multiple exposure composition.
- SI-20, similar to the SE-20 but with an engraved axial scale intended for determining subject size in microscope and bellows photography.

Five screens were added in the late model, most of which were variations of previous screens redesigned for long telephoto lenses:

- SA-26, similar to the SA-23, but designed for lenses with focal lengths greater than 300mm.
- SA-32 all-microprism field screen with finer microprism center.
- SA-37, similar to the SA-32, but intended for use with telephoto lenses or close-up photography.
- SC-26, similar to the SC-21, but designed for lenses with focal lengths greater than 300mm.
- SE-25, similar to the SE-20, but designed for lenses with focal lengths greater than 300mm.

Three additional focusing screens were added for the limited release of the LX 2000, which were about 1/6 EV brighter than original LX screens:

- SC-69, the same as the late-model SC-26.
- SE-60 plain all-matte field screen designed for use with mirror lenses and Pentax "Star" lenses.
- SG-60 all-matte field screen with a grid, designed for use with mirror lenses and Pentax "Star" lenses.

=== Winder and motor drive ===
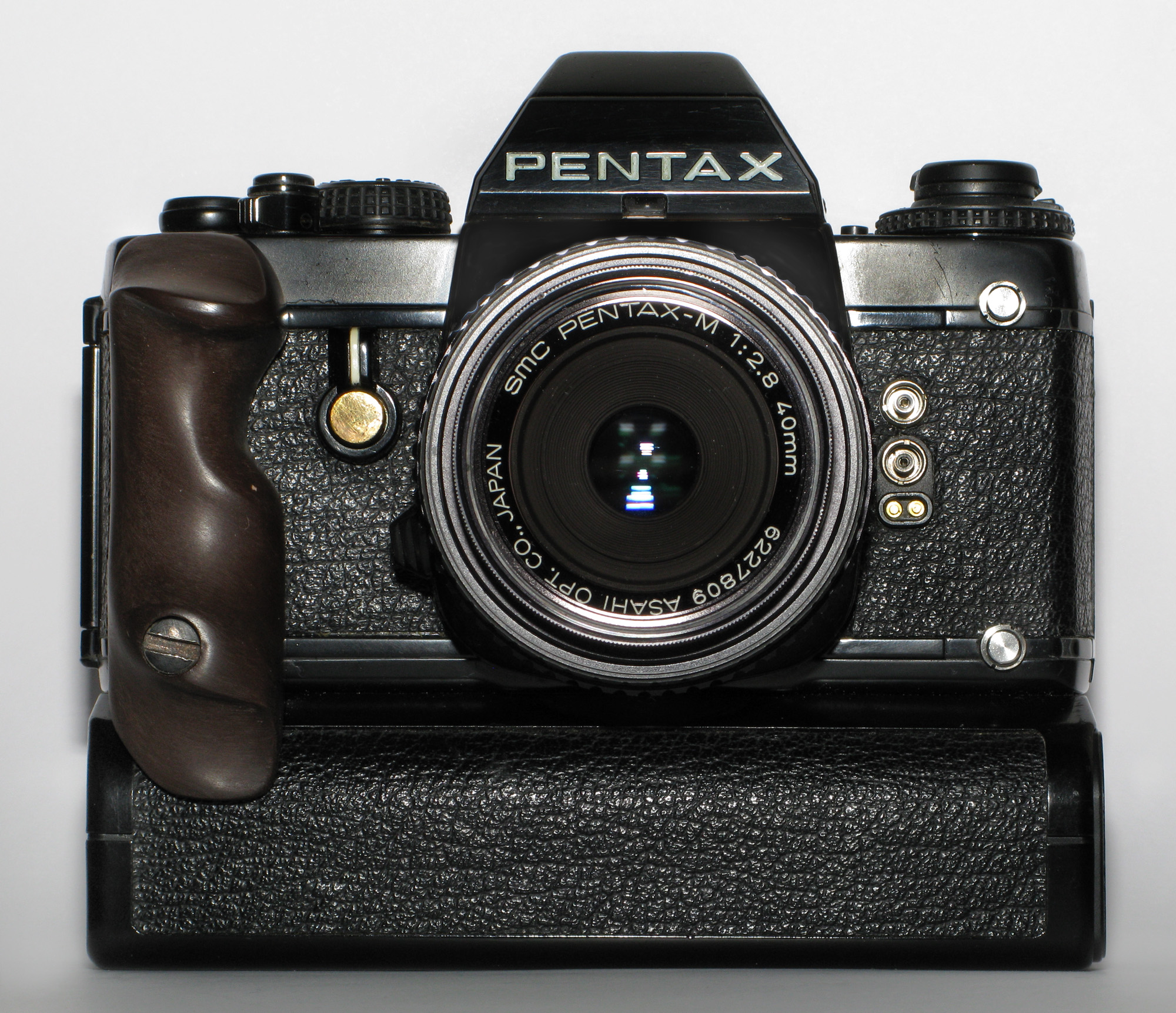
LX with winder attached

Both a dedicated winder and motor drive were made for the camera, allowing for automatic film advance as well as film rewind, utilizing the two winder coupling ports on the bottom of the camera. The coupling port caps, once removed using a screwdriver or a nickel, could be stored on the top of the winder or motor drive during use to prevent losing them. Both film advance options, unlike those of competing models, could operate at all available shutter speeds (except "B") and could be triggered with the camera's own shutter button. Neither have their own hand grips, but two accessory grips could be independently mounted on the LX body.

The Motor Drive LX was available for photography in situations where a fast framerate is needed (like sports photography), featuring a stepless variable speed of 0.5 to 5 fps—a unique feature among competitors (Note: Nikon later made the MK-1 variable firing rate converter for the MD-4, the sole winder option for the Nikon F3, because this feature was not included in the motor drive itself like in the LX's own.)—and a smaller, lighter construction, weighing in at 240 grams (0.53 pounds) on its own, and can rewind a 36-exposure roll of film in 8 seconds. The Motor Drive LX is powered by one of three external power source options: a slim, rechargeable Ni-Cd battery pack (Ni-Cd Battery Pack LX), a 12 AA battery grip (Battery Grip M) (both of which attach directly to the bottom), or a household AC convertor (Power Pack M) which powers the motor drive via the 4-pin remote control port on the side. A trigger cord can be attached to the 4-pin control port to fire the shutter remotely. The battery grips have their own shutter release trigger, working separately from the camera's own, as well as a drive mode switch independent from the switch on the motor drive.

For simplicity, the Winder LX was also offered as a lighter, more self-contained alternative to the motor drive system, weighing in at 285 grams (0.628 pounds). (Note: The motor drive itself weighs less, at 240 grams, but is compounded with the weight of the external power sources.) The winder is slower than the motor drive, with a fixed continuous shooting speed of 2 fps and a 15-second rewind, but is smaller and self-powered with 4 AA batteries. The winder features its own 3-pin remote control port, and accessories for the Motor Drive are not compatible with the Winder. A separate 3-pin 5m remote cable release was available, as well as a combined remote power source and shutter release (Remote Battery Pack), using the same port and battery tray.

=== Detachable back ===
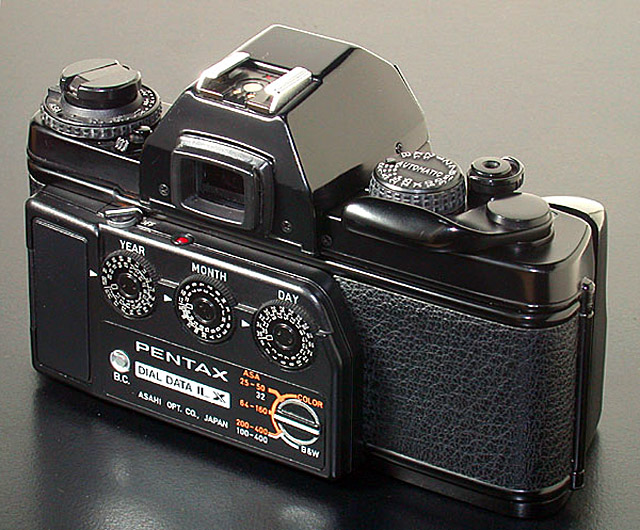
Dial Data LX

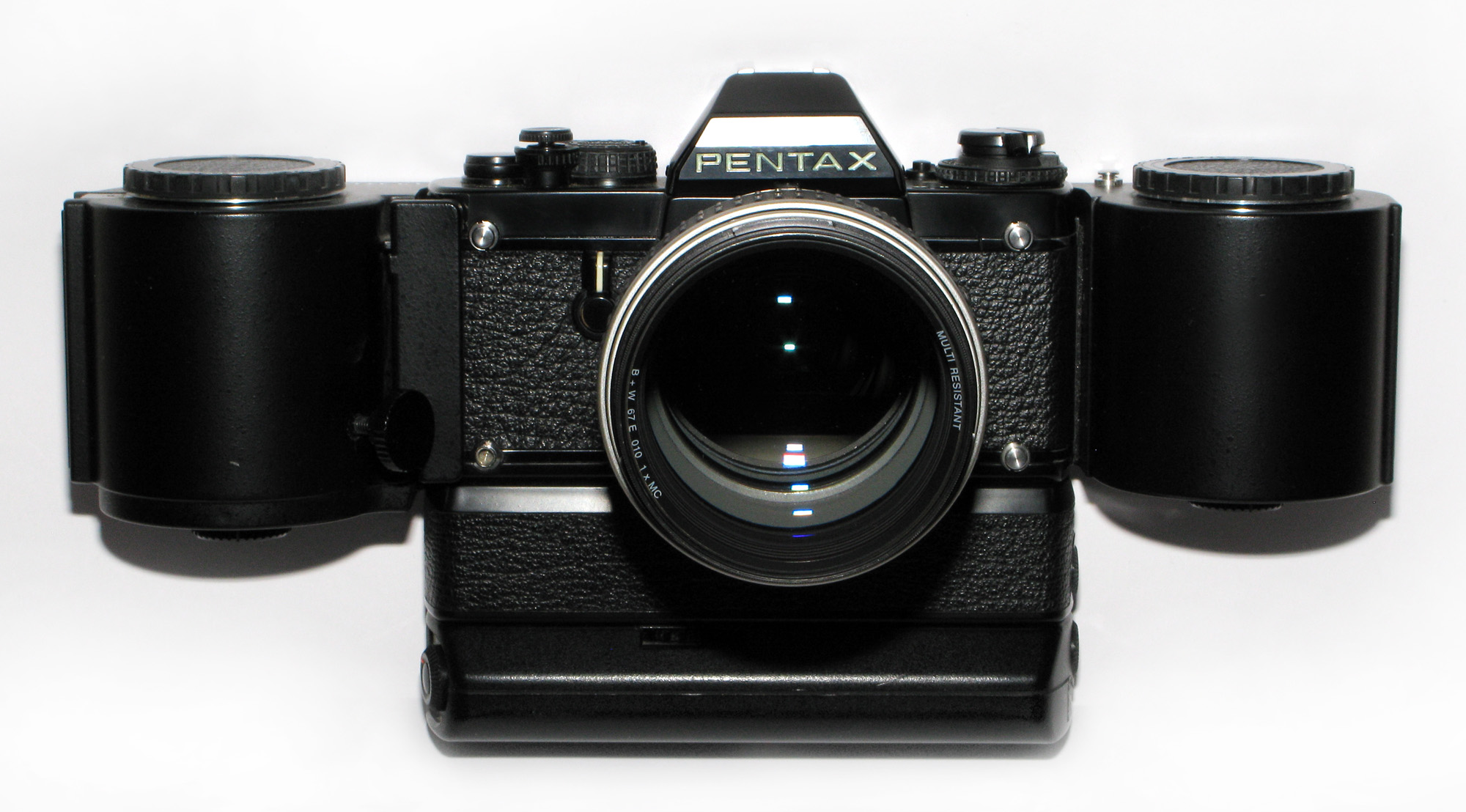
LX with bulk exposure back

The standard camera back is detachable and interchangeable with two data backs, one of which, the Dial Data LX superimposes up to three characters chosen by the user in a corner of the frame, and the other, the Watch Data LX, superimposes a tiny analog clockface in the corner of the frame. For use with the Watch Data LX was a small film blind behind the shutter that could be raised to block light from the corner of the film where the clockface would be superimposed. Also taking advantage of the removable back is a high-capacity magazine allowing for 250 exposures.

=== Other accessories ===
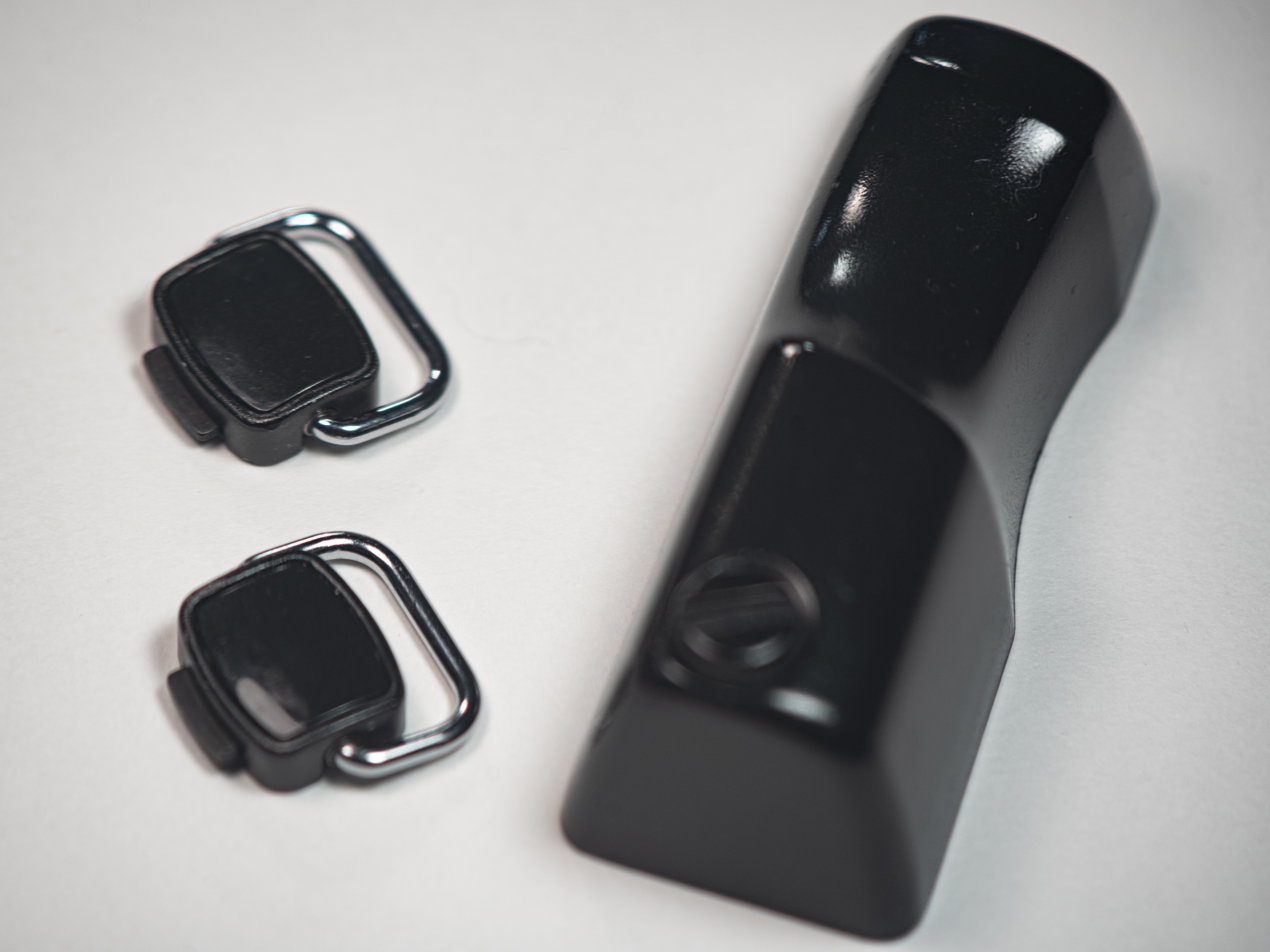
Pentax LX strap fasteners and Accessory Grip B

To attach a camera strap, separate strap fasteners could be mounted to any two of the three accessory lugs on the front of the camera body, allowing the LX to be carried either horizontally or vertically, such as when a grip occupies the righthand accessory lug. Two right-handed grips were produced, Accessory Grip A, which was made to be whittled down to suit a photographer's exact needs, and Accessory Grip B, which was hand-contoured. Either grip could be attached to the camera by using a nickel or a screwdriver to tighten a screw.

== Variations and special releases ==
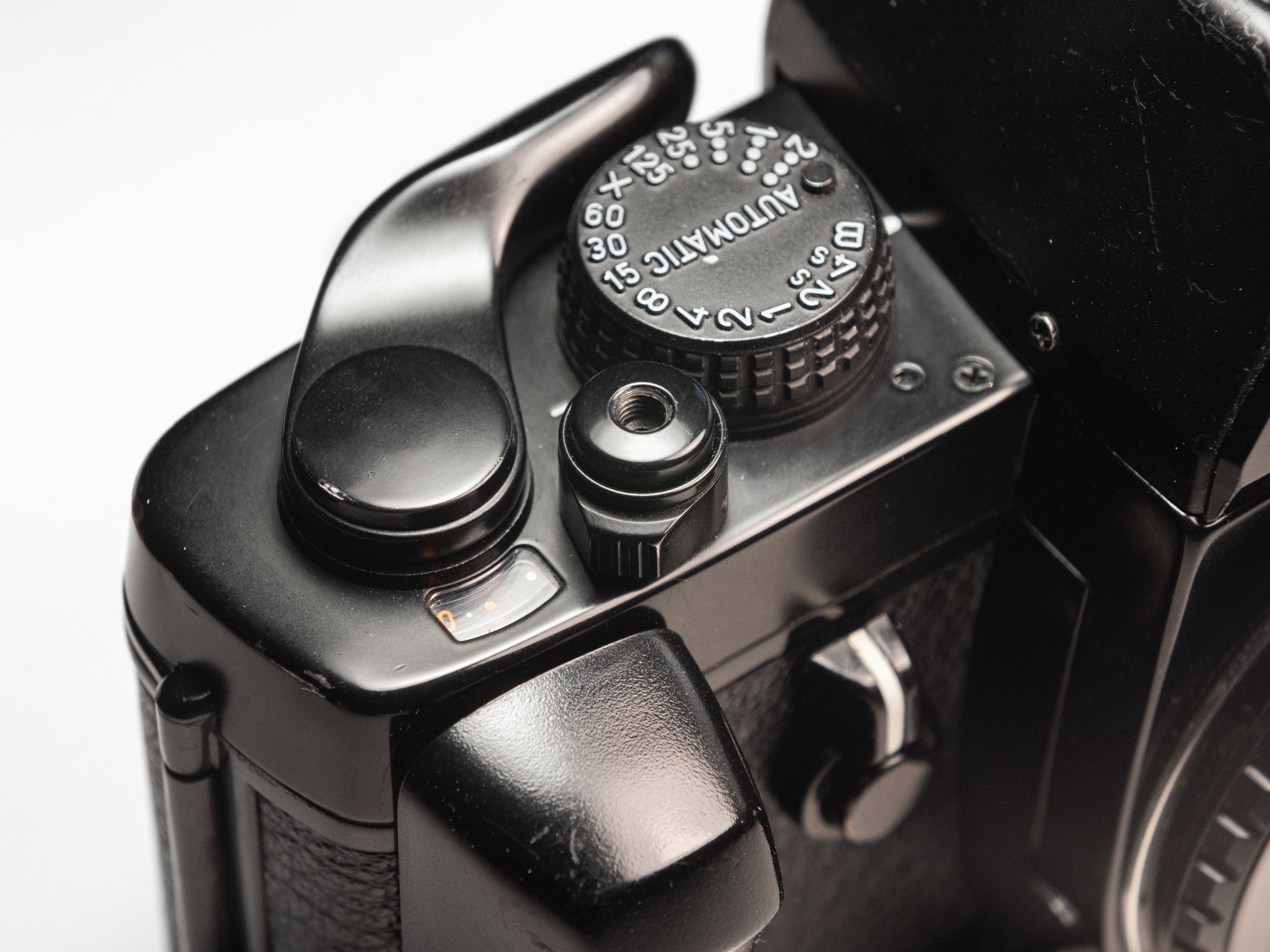
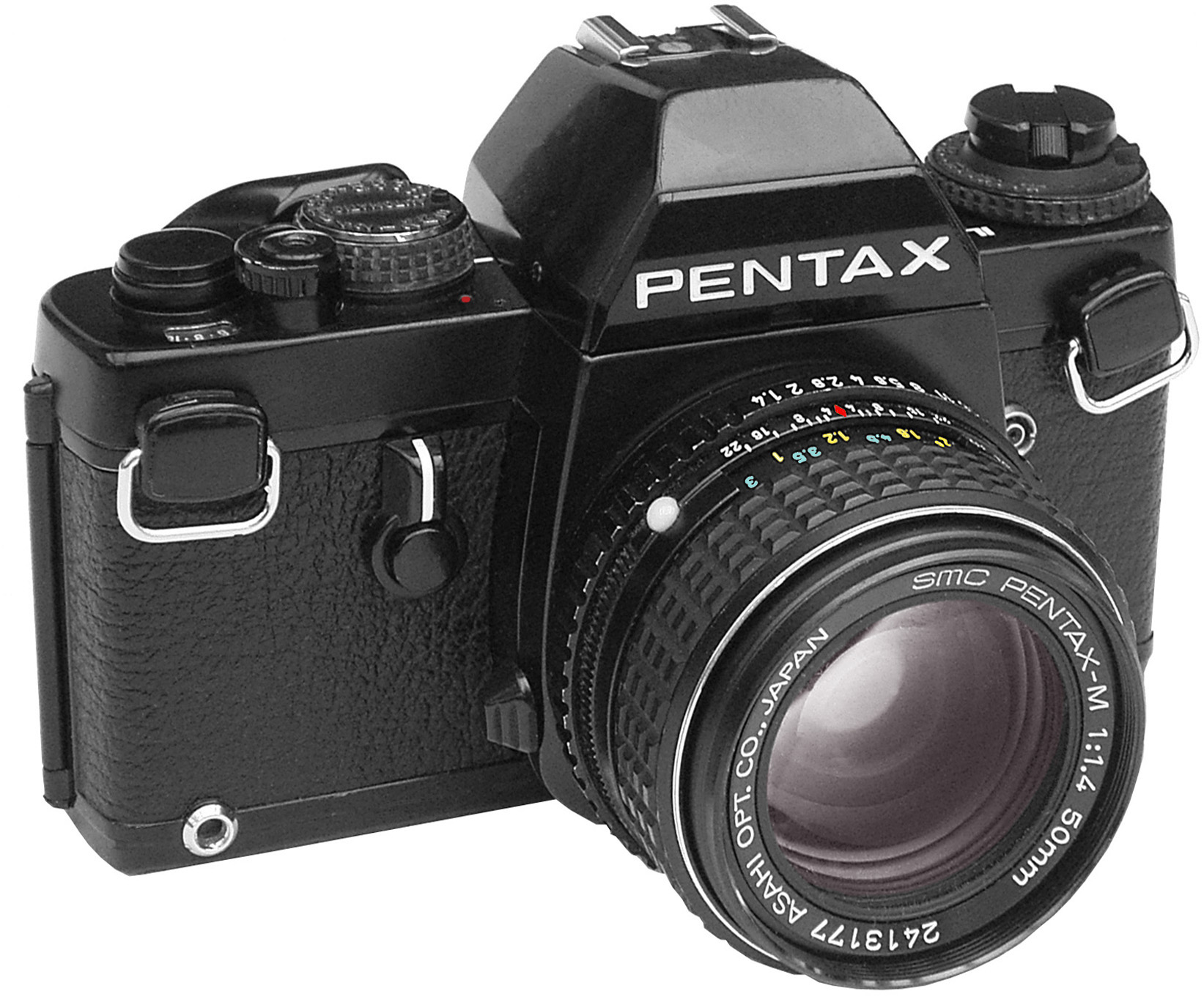
Comparison of the shutter button lock switch in the early model (left) and late model (right)

The Pentax LX body was updated at least three times during its 20-year production, with a key variation being in the design of the shutter button lock switch. Other minor variations are the removal of two of the white dots on the front shutter curtain and the ability to activate the light meter by pressing the button on the viewfinder release lever. There is no official distinction between the early and later models, and no link between exact serial numbers and design variations has been found, so the years of the updates are unknown.

=== Special releases ===
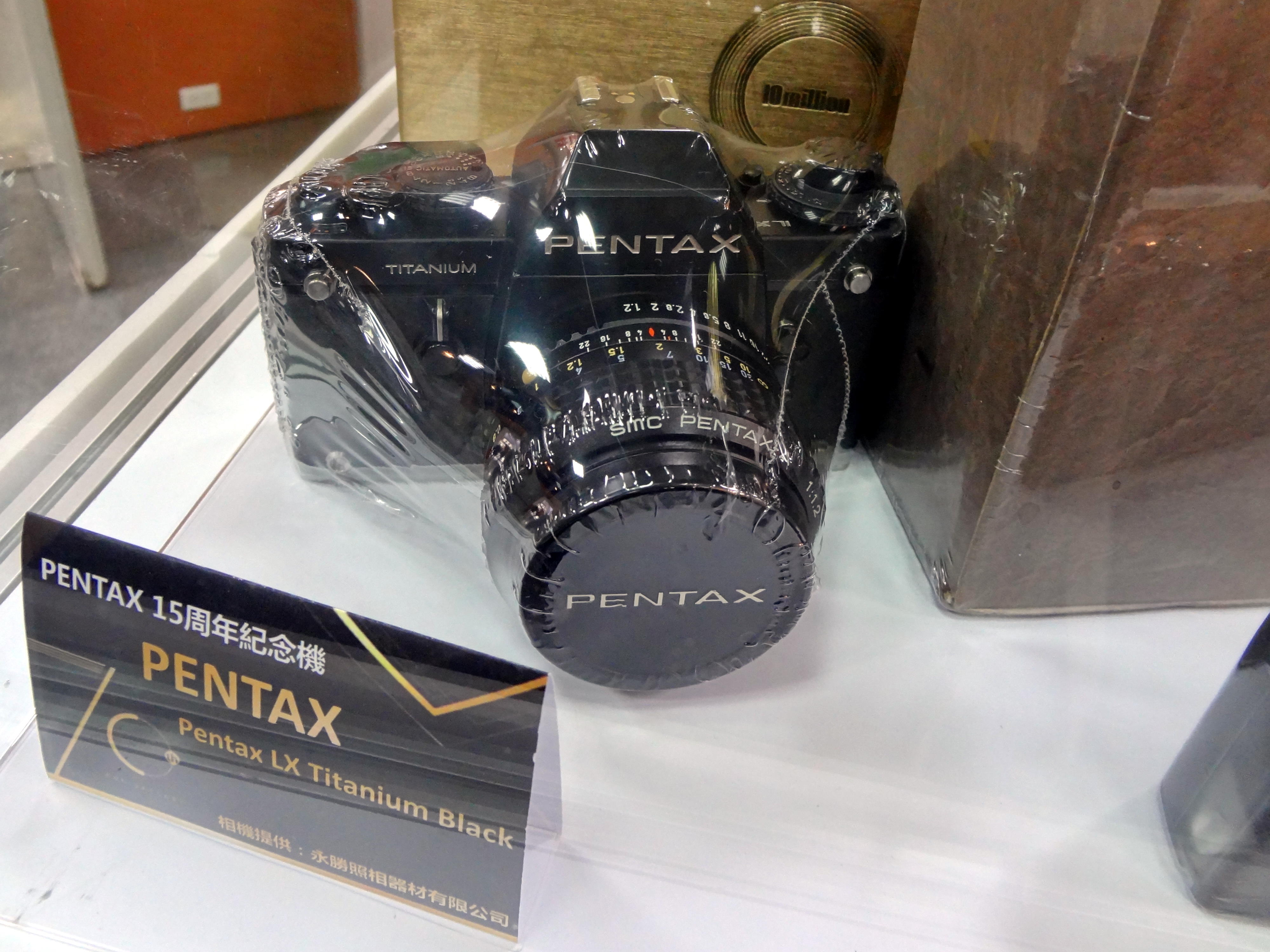
Pentax LX Titanium

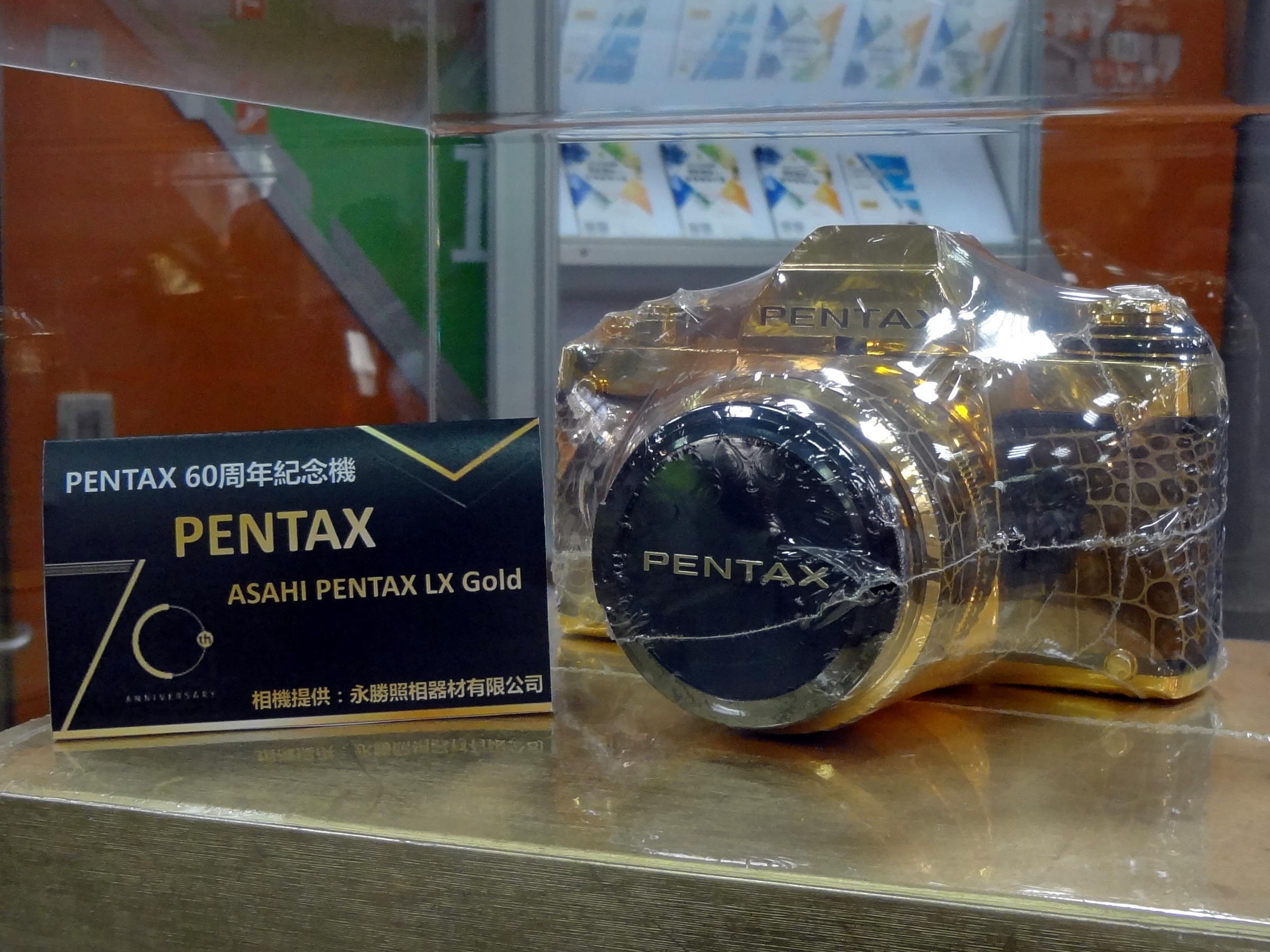
Pentax LX Gold

In October 1981, Pentax made available 300 limited edition Pentax LX Gold cameras to celebrate having produced 10 million SLRs, the first camera manufacturer to reach that milestone according to the accompanying certificate. The camera and its SMC 1:1.2 50 mm lens are partly plated in 24-karat gold and partly covered in brown reptile skin, while some details are made of brown plastic, and came with a brown Eveready Case. Cameras for some markets, such as the U.S., have brown leather instead of reptile skin supposedly due to import laws. The actual number of cameras made is somewhat higher than 300 since a few were retained at Pentax, reserved for their own use. The actual number for sale, however, was 300 cameras according to Pentax in Tokyo.

The Pentax LX Titanium was produced in 1994 in a limited edition of 1000 titanium-plated cameras to mark the company's 75th anniversary. Another Pentax LX Titanium was launched in 1996 in a limited number of 300, finished in black and carrying the inscription "Titanium".

The Pentax LX 2000 with an SMC Pentax-A 50mm f/1.2 lens in a lighter metal finish was released in the year 2000.

== Notes ==
Class	1970s										1980s										1990s										2000s									
Class	0	1	2	3	4	5	6	7	8	9	0	1	2	3	4	5	6	7	8	9	0	1	2	3	4	5	6	7	8	9	0	1	2	3	4	5	6	7	8	9
Flagship																						PZ-1 (Z-1)			PZ-1p (Z-1p)							MZ-S								
Flagship																									PZ-5p (Z-5p)															
Flagship											LX																													
Flagship							MX																																	
Flagship						K2 DMD																																		
Flagship						K2																																		
Midrange																		SFX (SF-1)			SFXn (SF-1n)							MZ-3 (ZX-3)				MZ-6 (ZX-L, MZ-L)								
Midrange																	P5 (P50)									MZ-5 (ZX-5)		MZ-5n (ZX-5n)												
Midrange														Super-A (Super Program)										PZ-20p (Z-20p)						MZ-7 (ZX-7)										
Midrange														Program-A (Program Plus)										Z-50p				MZ-50 (ZX-50)			MZ-30 (ZX-30)		MZ-60 (ZX-60)							
Midrange						KX						ME F														PZ-70p (Z-70p)														
Midrange							ME			ME Super																														
Entry-level																			SF7 (SF10)								MZ-10 (ZX-10)							*ist						
Entry-level																							PZ-20 (Z-20)			PZ-70 (Z-70)														
Entry-level																						PZ-10 (Z-10)																		
Entry-level																P3 (P30)			P3n (P30n)		P3t (P30t)								MZ-M (ZX-M)											
Entry-level						KM				MV	MV 1		MG			A3 (A3000)																								
Entry-level							K1000																																	
