= Pentax ME Super =

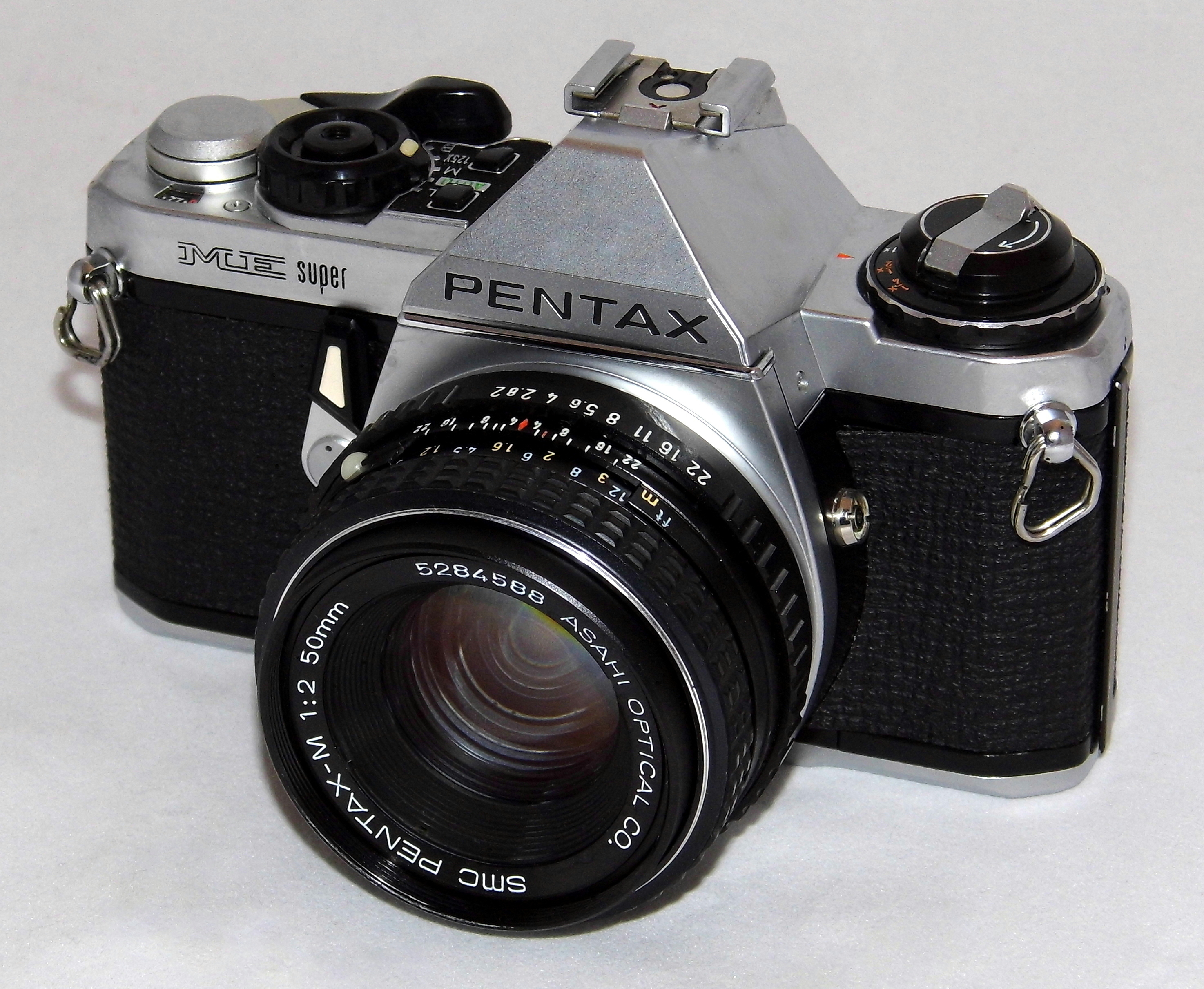
- Pentax ME Super with SMC Pentax-M 50/2 lens

Overview
- Maker: Asahi Optical Co., Ltd.
- Type: SLR
- Production: 1979–1984

Lens
- Lens mount: Pentax K-F mount

Sensor/medium
- Recording medium: 135 film

Focusing
- Focus: Manual Focus

Exposure/metering
- Exposure: Aperture priority, Manual

Flash
- Flash: Hot shoe

Shutter
- Shutter speeds: 4 – 1/2000 s

General
- Dimensions: 131.5×83×49.5 mm (5.18×3.27×1.95 in)
- Weight: 460 g (16 oz) (1.01 lb)

The Pentax ME Super is a highly successful 35 mm single-lens reflex camera produced by Pentax of Japan between 1979 and 1984.

== History ==
The camera was a development of (and one of two replacements for) the Pentax ME. Both feature semi-automatic (aperture priority) operation, and are part of the Pentax M series which included the manual Pentax MX and briefly the semi-automatic, automatic-focus Pentax ME F. The ME Super added a manual mode to the feature set of the ME. Since the ME Super was a better-specified camera than the ME, a second model was introduced at the same time as the lower-end replacement for the ME: the short-lived Pentax MV model, quickly replaced by the Pentax MV1.

== Operation ==
The ME Super has an electronic focal plane shutter with metal curtains and a vertical movement. Shutter speeds are selected with up and down buttons rather than the conventional wheel. They run from 4 seconds to 1/2000 of a second, with flash synchronisation at 1/125 of a second. The hotshoe features an additional shoe contact for dedicated Pentax flash units, not seen on the preceding ME.

In the event of battery failure, the camera can continue to operate at a shutter speed of 1/125 of a second. This feature was lost in later, more fully automatic models such as the Pentax Super-A, contributing to the long-lasting popularity of the ME Super. Two LR44 (or equivalent) batteries power the camera.

The camera has a 0.95x viewfinder, covering 92% of the field. The finder screen is fixed, with a split image and a microprism ring in the centre. The exposure meter is a TTL open aperture centre-weighted type. The shutter speed chosen by the camera or the user is displayed in the finder, the aperture is not. LEDs display the shutter speed and inform of over/under exposure, possibility of shake, use of the EV-compensation and use of Manual mode.

Pentax ME Super supports a manual ISO range from 12 - 1600 ASA which can be configured using a dial located on the top of the camera.

The selector around the release button has five positions: L (lock), Auto, M (manual), 125x, and B. The Pentax ME Super can attach to the external winder ME (1.5 i/s) or the later Winder ME II (2i/s) and can also mount a Dial Data ME databack, or the later Digital Data M databack via a cord adapter. As with some other M series cameras, there is a window next to the winder arm which indicates film movement, and assists the user in rewinding film into the cassette without losing the tip of the film.

The lenses are interchangeable with the K bayonet mount, and a series of SMC Pentax-M compact lenses were introduced during the lifetime of the M series models.

The body was available with a chrome or black finish on the upper parts and base (the central body being always black). There was a special edition called ME Super SE, only sold in chrome finish; the differences are the SE marking and the diagonal instead of horizontal split-image device in the focusing screen.

== See also ==
- List of Pentax products

Class	1970s										1980s										1990s										2000s									
Class	0	1	2	3	4	5	6	7	8	9	0	1	2	3	4	5	6	7	8	9	0	1	2	3	4	5	6	7	8	9	0	1	2	3	4	5	6	7	8	9
Flagship																						PZ-1 (Z-1)			PZ-1p (Z-1p)							MZ-S								
Flagship																									PZ-5p (Z-5p)															
Flagship											LX																													
Flagship							MX																																	
Flagship						K2 DMD																																		
Flagship						K2																																		
Midrange																		SFX (SF-1)			SFXn (SF-1n)							MZ-3 (ZX-3)				MZ-6 (ZX-L, MZ-L)								
Midrange																	P5 (P50)									MZ-5 (ZX-5)		MZ-5n (ZX-5n)												
Midrange														Super-A (Super Program)										PZ-20p (Z-20p)						MZ-7 (ZX-7)										
Midrange														Program-A (Program Plus)										Z-50p				MZ-50 (ZX-50)			MZ-30 (ZX-30)		MZ-60 (ZX-60)							
Midrange						KX						ME F														PZ-70p (Z-70p)														
Midrange							ME			ME Super																														
Entry-level																			SF7 (SF10)								MZ-10 (ZX-10)							*ist						
Entry-level																							PZ-20 (Z-20)			PZ-70 (Z-70)														
Entry-level																						PZ-10 (Z-10)																		
Entry-level																P3 (P30)			P3n (P30n)		P3t (P30t)								MZ-M (ZX-M)											
Entry-level						KM				MV	MV 1		MG			A3 (A3000)																								
Entry-level							K1000																																	
