= Pentax ME =

35 mm manual single-lens reflex film camera

Asahi Pentax ME
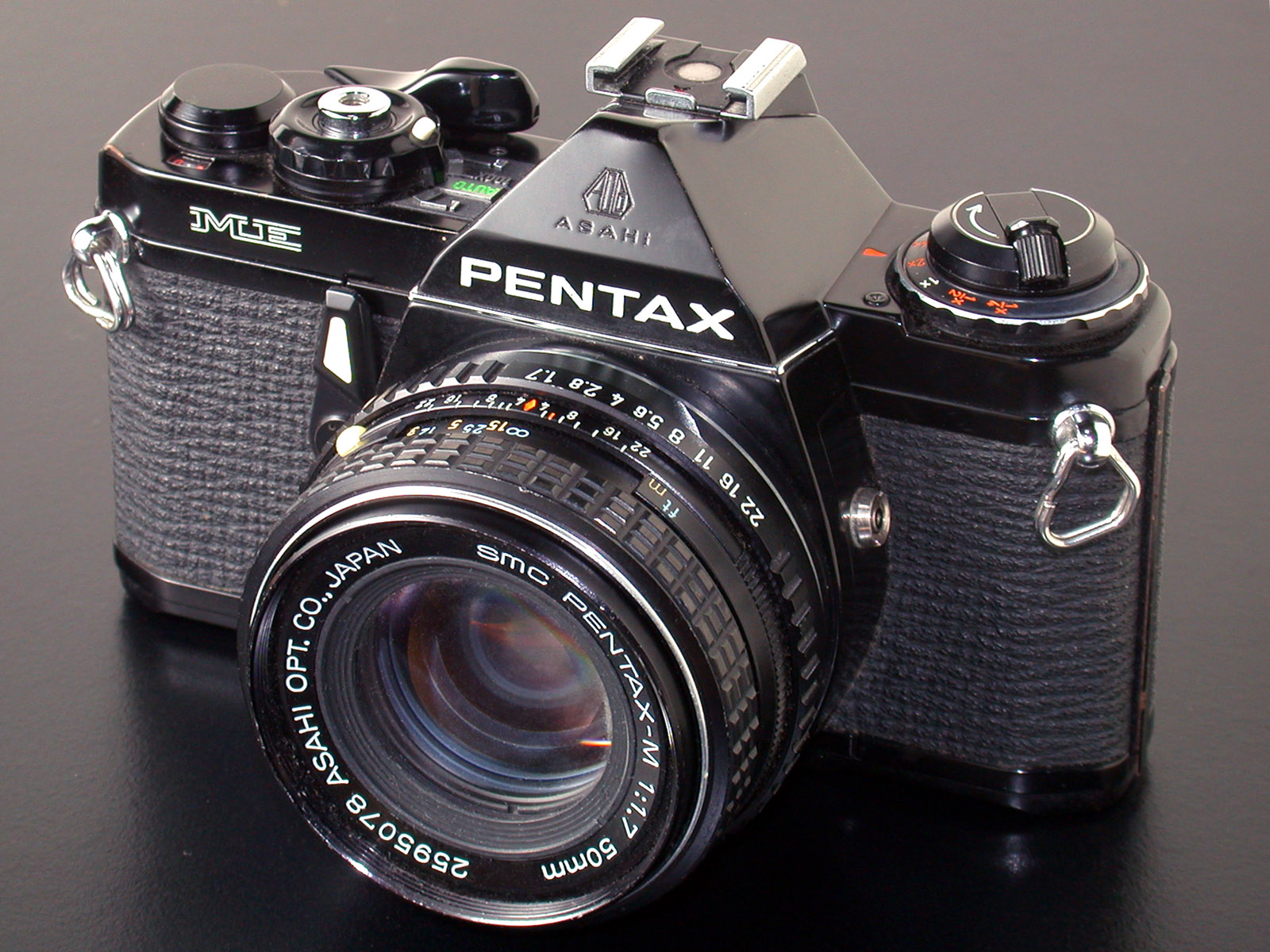
- Pentax ME w/50mm f/1.7

Overview
- Maker: Asahi Optical Co., Ltd.
- Type: SLR
- Released: 1977
- Production: 1977–1979

Lens
- Lens mount: K mount

Sensor/medium
- Recording medium: 135 film

Focusing
- Focus: Manual

Exposure/metering
- Exposure: Aperture priority

Flash
- Flash: Hot shoe

Shutter
- Shutter speeds: 1 – 1/1000 s, Bulb

General
- Dimensions: 135.8×82.5×49.3 mm (5.35×3.25×1.94 in)
- Weight: 495 g (17 oz) (1.091 lb)
- Made in: Japan

Chronology
- Successor: Pentax ME Super

The Pentax ME, originally marked the Asahi Pentax ME, was a 1977-introduced, aperture priority automatic camera with an electronic focal plane shutter from 8 s to 1/1000 s, synchronized at 1/100 s produced by Pentax of Japan between 1977 and 1979.

The shutter curtains were metal and had a vertical movement. There was no shutter dial, and the camera could not be used in manual mode, except for B and 1/100 exposures. The Pentax-invented digital light meter was of the standard TTL open aperture center weighted type. It was activated by a slight pressure on the release button.

ME and MX models were Pentax's response to a new trend towards compactness in SLR cameras, which began with the launch of the Olympus OM-1 in 1972. In fact, an ME is even smaller than an OM-1.

== Overview ==
The Pentax ME had a 0.97× viewfinder, covering 92% of the field. The finder screen was fixed, with a split image and a microprism ring in the center. The shutter speed chosen by the camera was displayed in the finder, the aperture was not.

There was a hot shoe on the top of the prism and a self-timer. The selector around the release button had four positions: L (lock), Auto, 100X (1/100, X sync) and B. The Pentax ME could attach an external winder ME I (1.5 i/s) or the later ME II (2i/s). The Pentax ME could also mount a Dial Data ME databack, or the later Digital Data M databack via a cord adapter.

The lenses were interchangeable with the K bayonet mount. Together with the ME and MX was introduced the SMC Pentax-M series of compact lenses.

The Pentax ME existed in chrome or black finish, and a limited edition called ME SE had a brown leather covering with the chrome finish.

It was followed in 1979 by the more advanced Pentax ME Super and the cheaper Pentax MV.

Class	1970s										1980s										1990s										2000s									
Class	0	1	2	3	4	5	6	7	8	9	0	1	2	3	4	5	6	7	8	9	0	1	2	3	4	5	6	7	8	9	0	1	2	3	4	5	6	7	8	9
Flagship																						PZ-1 (Z-1)			PZ-1p (Z-1p)							MZ-S								
Flagship																									PZ-5p (Z-5p)															
Flagship											LX																													
Flagship							MX																																	
Flagship						K2 DMD																																		
Flagship						K2																																		
Midrange																		SFX (SF-1)			SFXn (SF-1n)							MZ-3 (ZX-3)				MZ-6 (ZX-L, MZ-L)								
Midrange																	P5 (P50)									MZ-5 (ZX-5)		MZ-5n (ZX-5n)												
Midrange														Super-A (Super Program)										PZ-20p (Z-20p)						MZ-7 (ZX-7)										
Midrange														Program-A (Program Plus)										Z-50p				MZ-50 (ZX-50)			MZ-30 (ZX-30)		MZ-60 (ZX-60)							
Midrange						KX						ME F														PZ-70p (Z-70p)														
Midrange							ME			ME Super																														
Entry-level																			SF7 (SF10)								MZ-10 (ZX-10)							*ist						
Entry-level																							PZ-20 (Z-20)			PZ-70 (Z-70)														
Entry-level																						PZ-10 (Z-10)																		
Entry-level																P3 (P30)			P3n (P30n)		P3t (P30t)								MZ-M (ZX-M)											
Entry-level						KM				MV	MV 1		MG			A3 (A3000)																								
Entry-level							K1000																																	
