= Pentax Super-A =

35 mm single-lens reflex camera

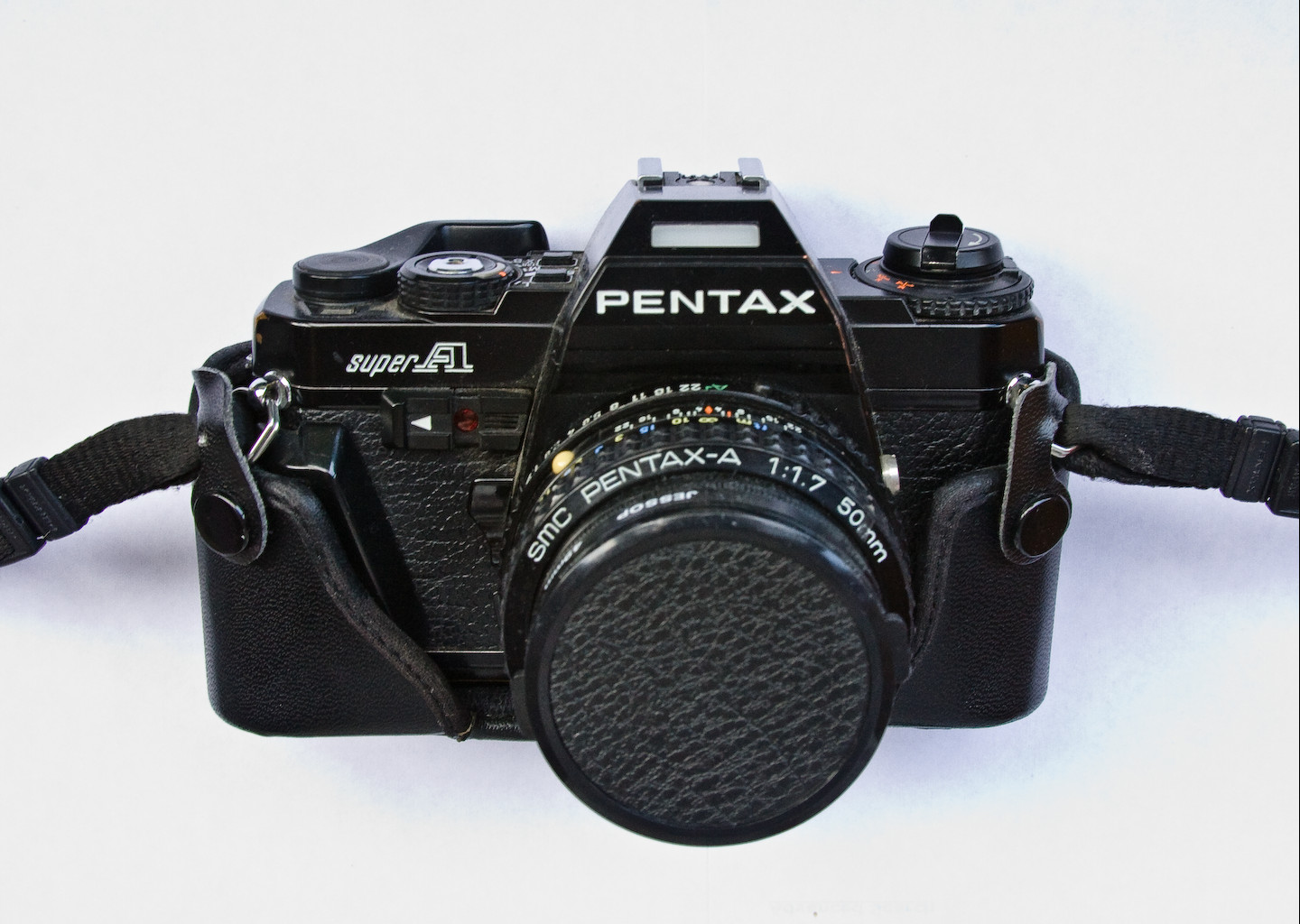
Pentax Super-A in black

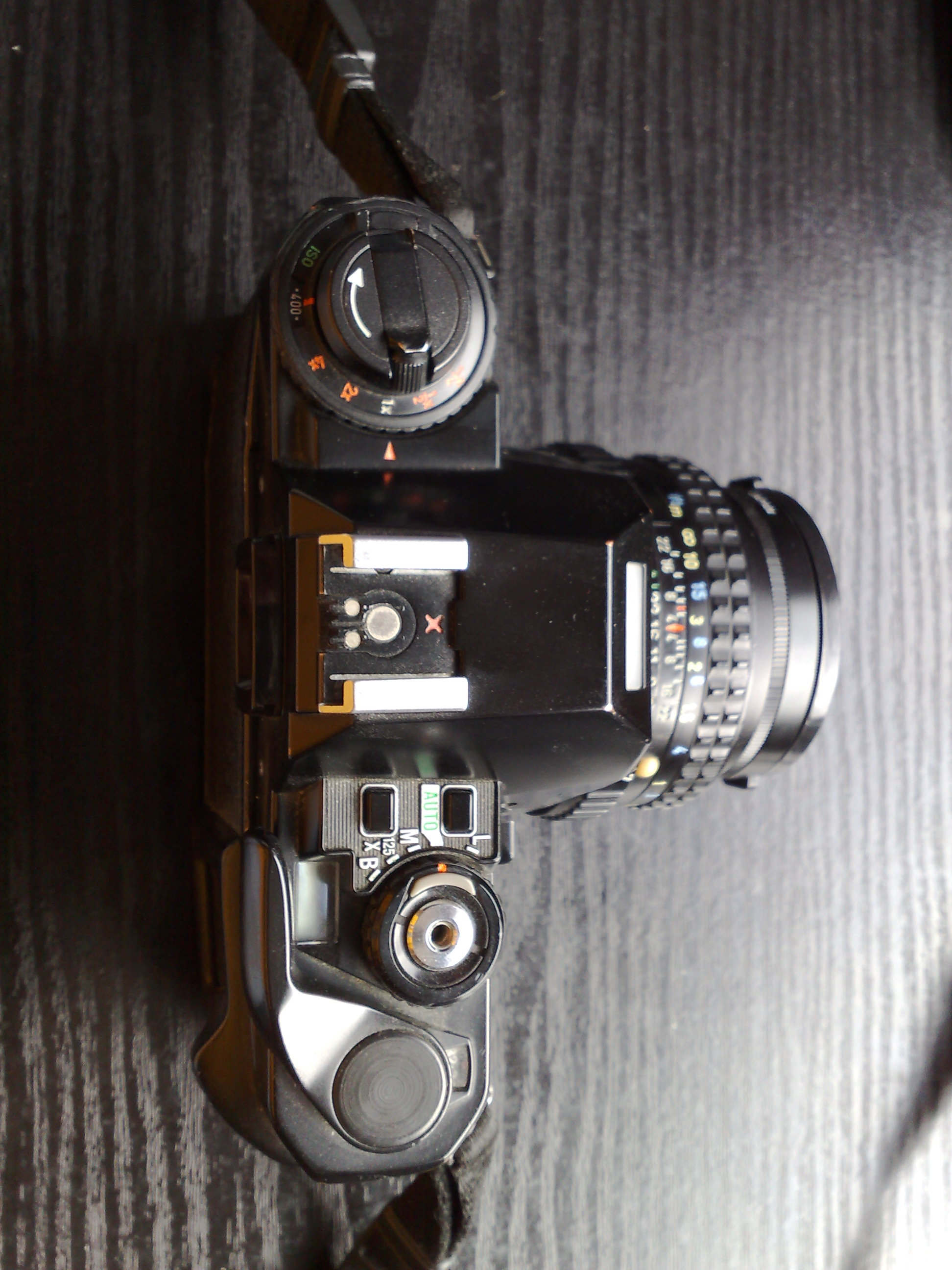
Upper control panel

The Pentax Super-A, also sold in some markets as the Pentax Super Program, was a 35 mm single-lens reflex camera produced by Pentax of Japan in the 1980s.

It is not the same camera as the slightly lower-specified "Pentax Program A" (which also had an alternative name, the "Pentax Program Plus".)

== Functions ==
The camera offers fully automatic exposure ("program") mode when coupled with an appropriate Pentax-A series lens. With such a lens the camera also offers shutter-priority mode, and with any compatible lens (i.e. Pentax-M lenses in addition to the Pentax-A series) the camera offers aperture-priority and fully manual modes.

The shutter speeds, selected by up/down buttons rather than the conventional wheel, run from 1/2000 of a second to 15 seconds, plus a "bulb" mode. There is flash synchronisation at 1/125 of a second. Unlike the camera's most direct predecessor, the semi-automatic Pentax ME-Super, this model cannot function at 1/125 of a second, or at all, once the batteries have been exhausted. Speed is displayed on an LCD panel on the top of the camera adjacent to the buttons (which also shows whether the camera is cocked), and both speed and aperture are visible on LCD displays inside the viewfinder. These receive natural light through a translucent plastic window on the pentaprism housing and can be electrically lit at the press of a button. Also in the viewfinder, centred, is a split image focus aid surrounded by a microprism ring.

A further improvement over the ME Super was the inclusion of a depth-of-field preview lever. The camera also featured a self-timer, which was electronic rather than the manual lever of its predecessors. The available ISO film speed choices were extended too, and run from 6 to 3200 ASA.

As with the previous M series cameras, there is a window next to the winder arm which indicated film movement, and assists the user in rewinding film into the cassette without losing the tip of the film.

Metering is through the lens. Camera also features direct TTL flash metering.

The Super A version was available with a black top-plate (and matching base), the Super Program version was available with a chrome-coloured top-plate (and matching base). The main body, plastic grip, and lenses were always black.

The European camera of the year version (1983) had a small round brass plate on the front lefthand side of the body. This all came with a lens cap and strap with the European camera of the year insignia.

== More photos ==
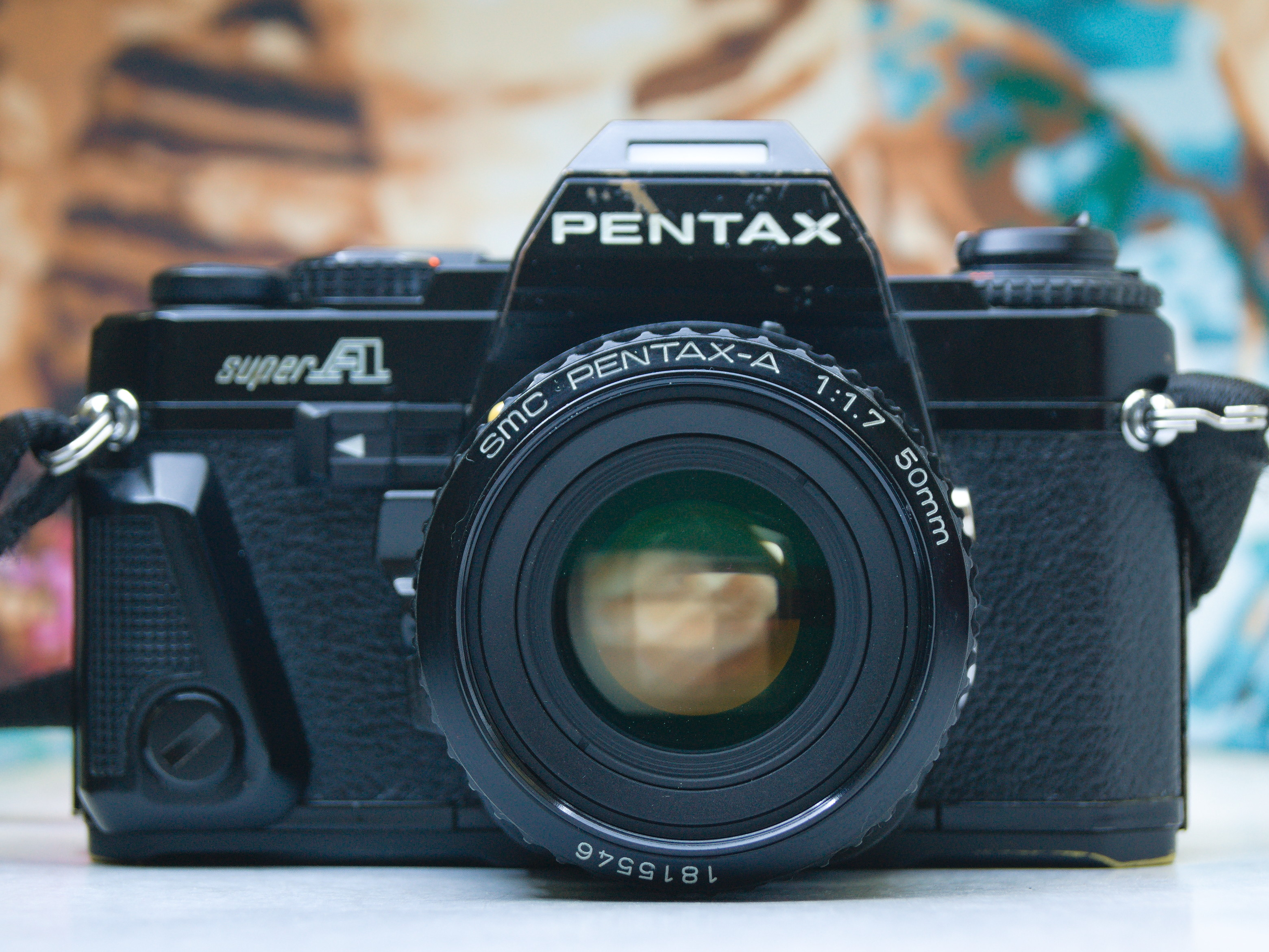
Front of Pentax Super A

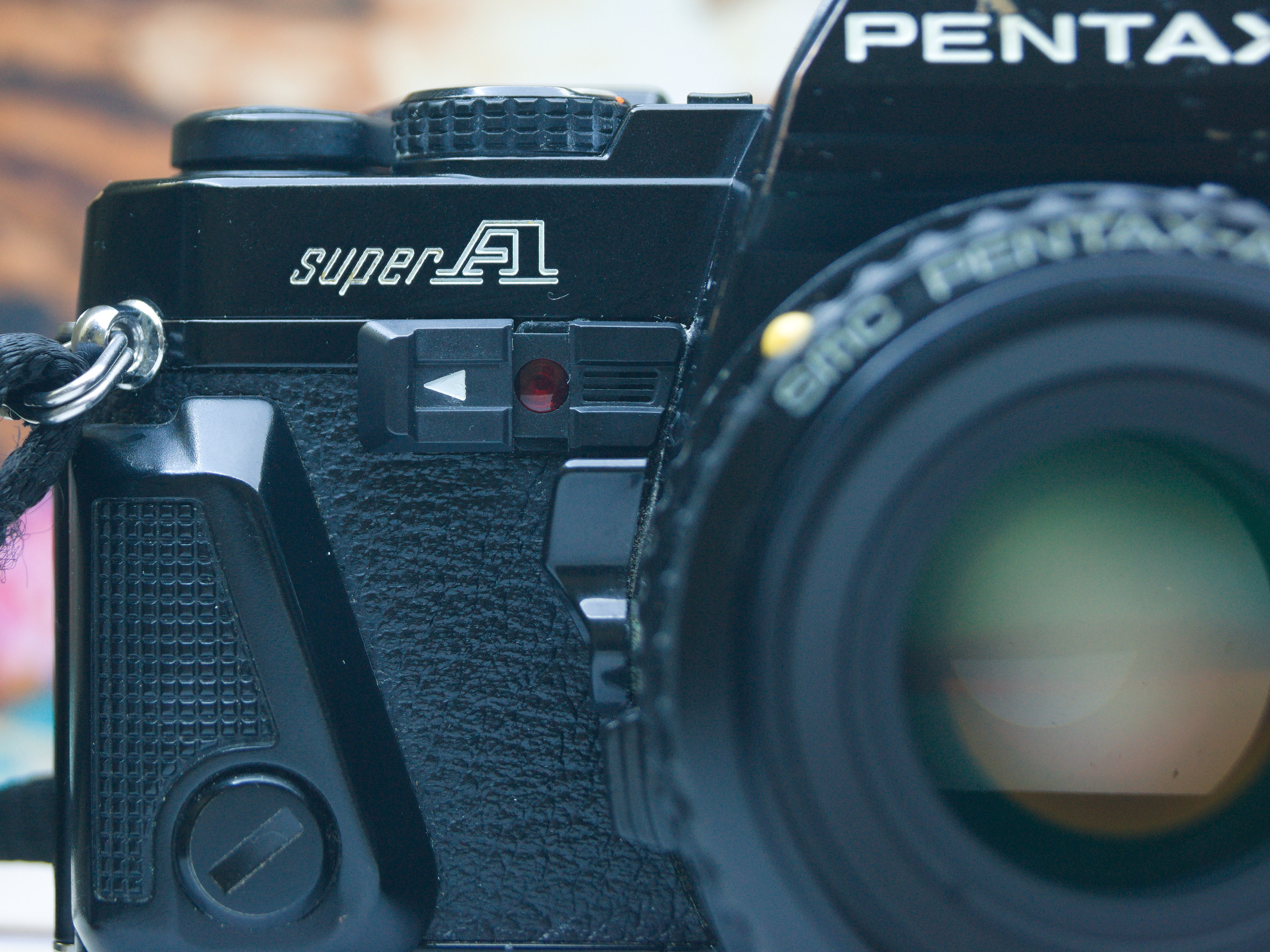
Activated self timer

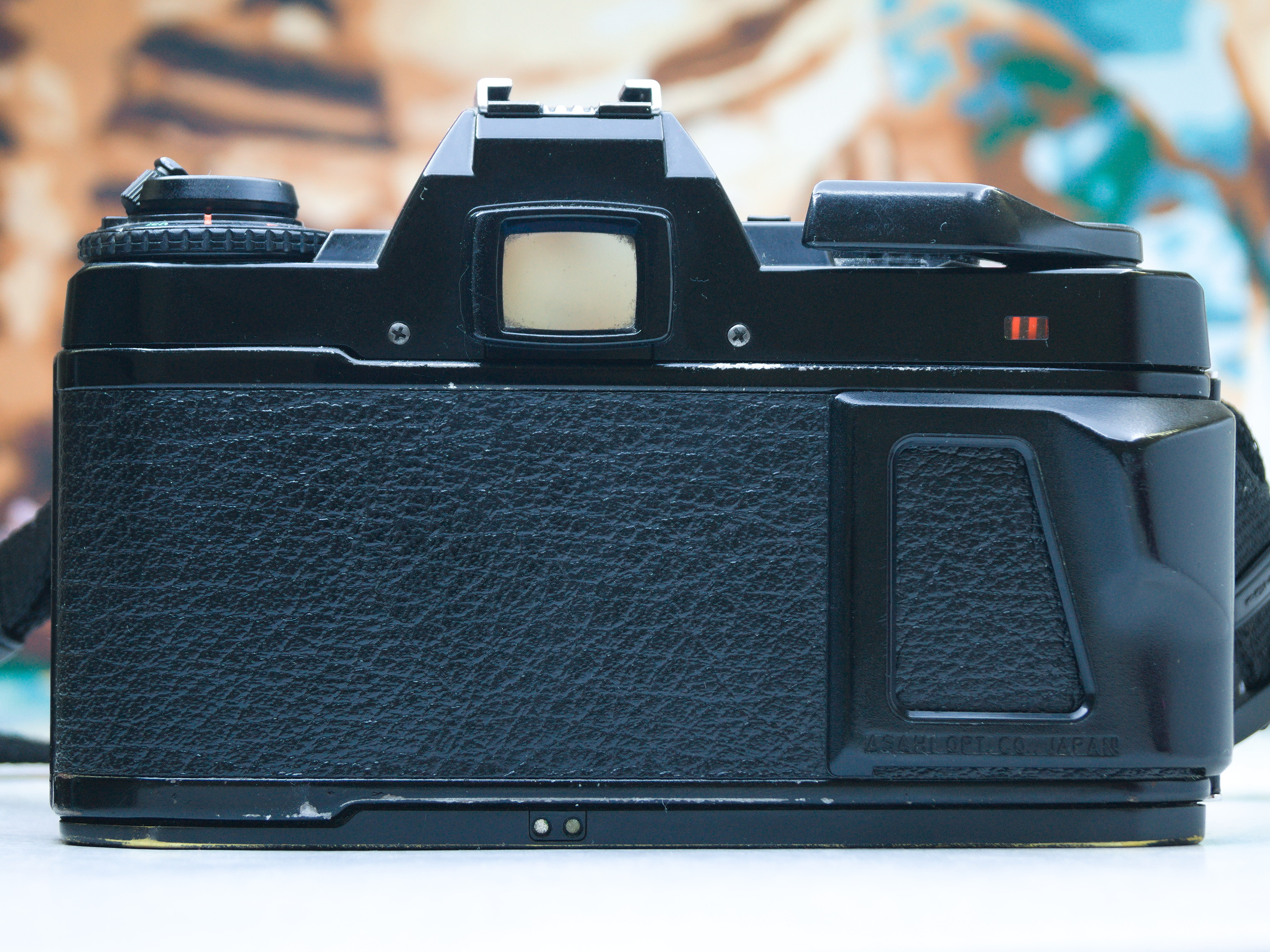
Closed back

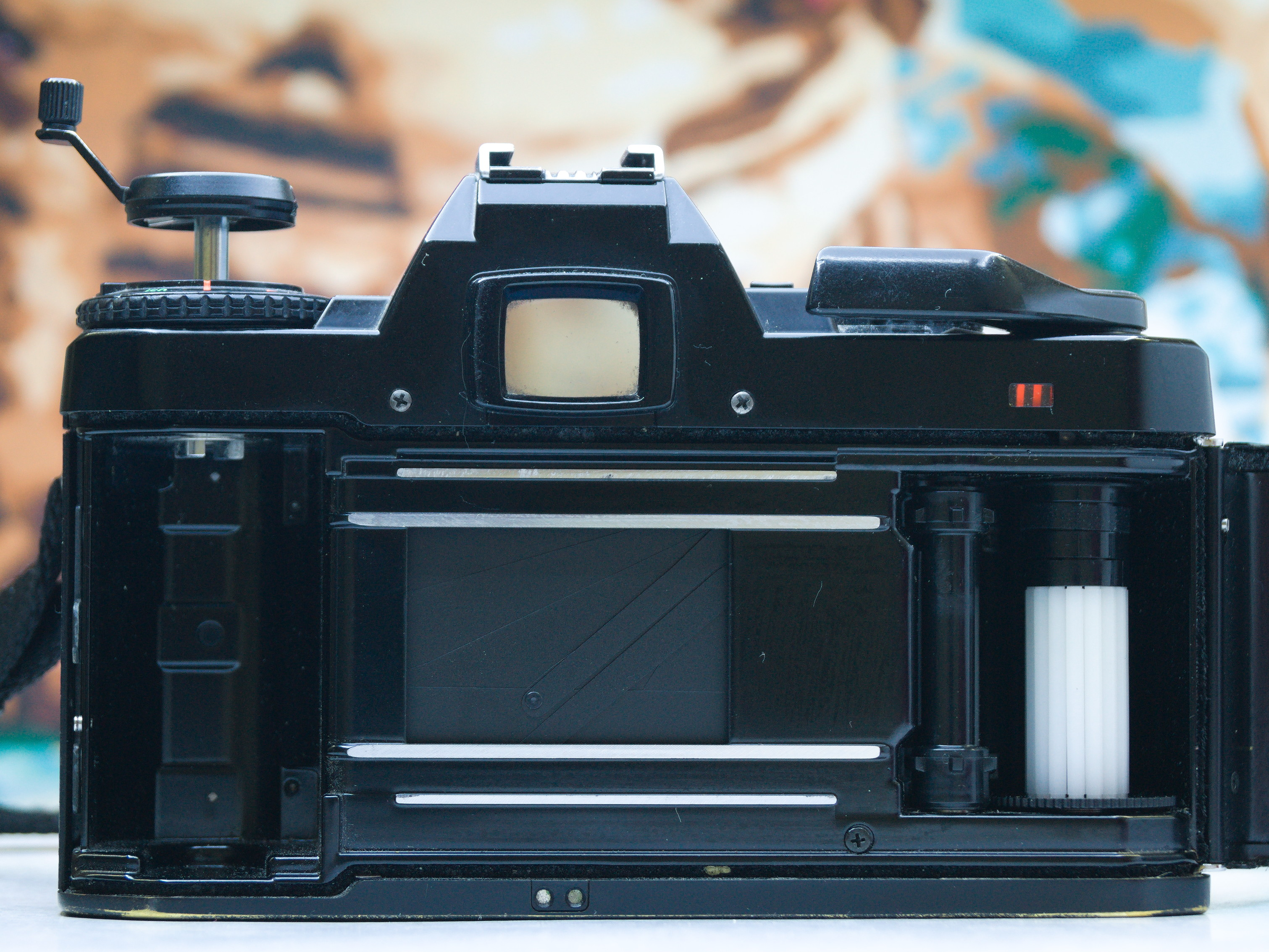
Open back

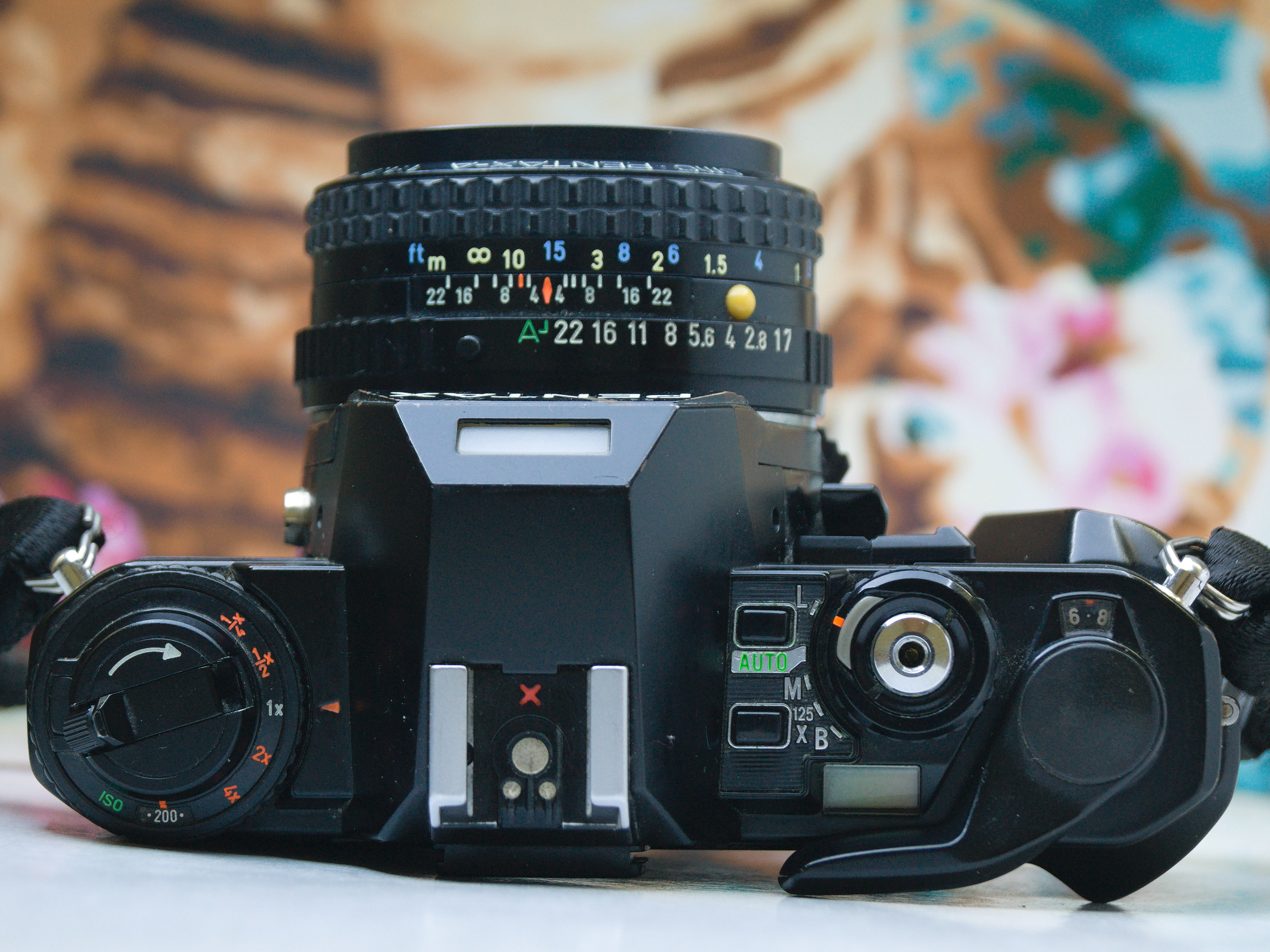
Top cover

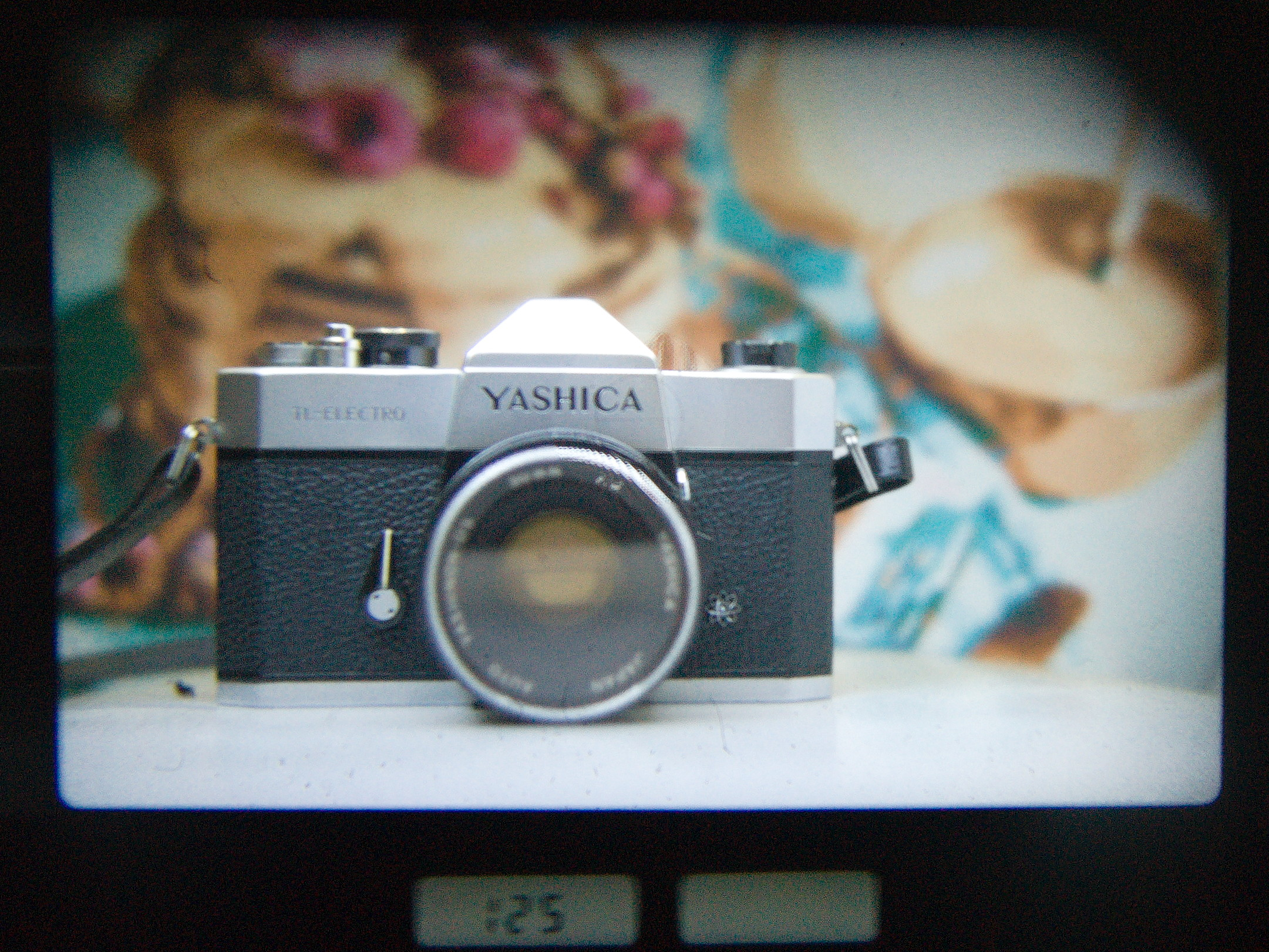
Viewfinder in aperture priority mode

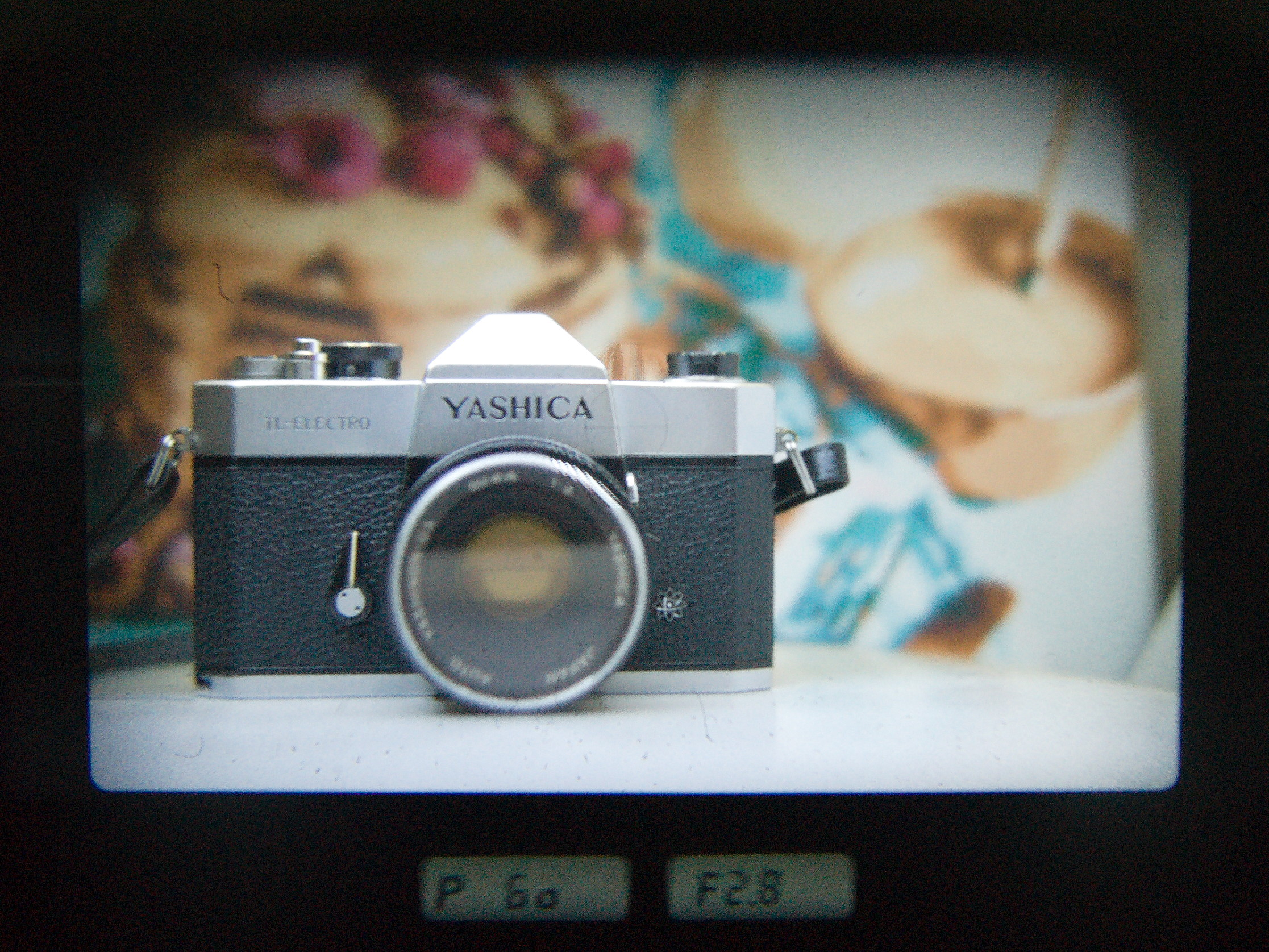
Viewfinder in full auto mode

== See also ==
- List of Pentax products

Class	1970s										1980s										1990s										2000s									
Class	0	1	2	3	4	5	6	7	8	9	0	1	2	3	4	5	6	7	8	9	0	1	2	3	4	5	6	7	8	9	0	1	2	3	4	5	6	7	8	9
Flagship																						PZ-1 (Z-1)			PZ-1p (Z-1p)							MZ-S								
Flagship																									PZ-5p (Z-5p)															
Flagship											LX																													
Flagship							MX																																	
Flagship						K2 DMD																																		
Flagship						K2																																		
Midrange																		SFX (SF-1)			SFXn (SF-1n)							MZ-3 (ZX-3)				MZ-6 (ZX-L, MZ-L)								
Midrange																	P5 (P50)									MZ-5 (ZX-5)		MZ-5n (ZX-5n)												
Midrange														Super-A (Super Program)										PZ-20p (Z-20p)						MZ-7 (ZX-7)										
Midrange														Program-A (Program Plus)										Z-50p				MZ-50 (ZX-50)			MZ-30 (ZX-30)		MZ-60 (ZX-60)							
Midrange						KX						ME F														PZ-70p (Z-70p)														
Midrange							ME			ME Super																														
Entry-level																			SF7 (SF10)								MZ-10 (ZX-10)							*ist						
Entry-level																							PZ-20 (Z-20)			PZ-70 (Z-70)														
Entry-level																						PZ-10 (Z-10)																		
Entry-level																P3 (P30)			P3n (P30n)		P3t (P30t)								MZ-M (ZX-M)											
Entry-level						KM				MV	MV 1		MG			A3 (A3000)																								
Entry-level							K1000																																	
