= Motor drive (photography) =

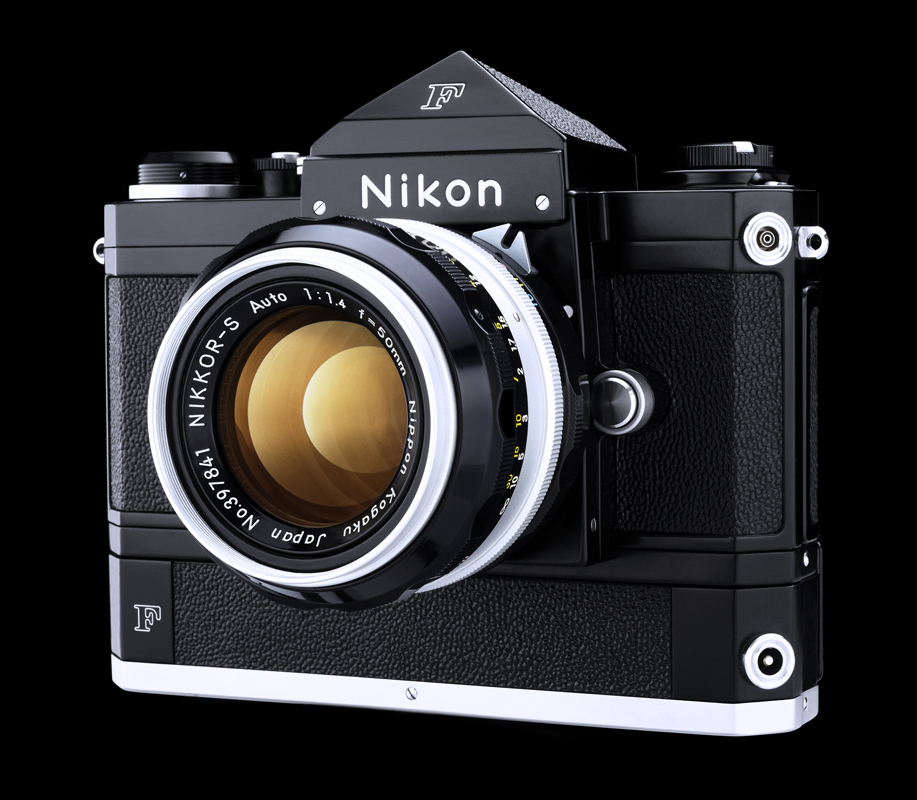
Nikon F with motor drive, 1971-1973

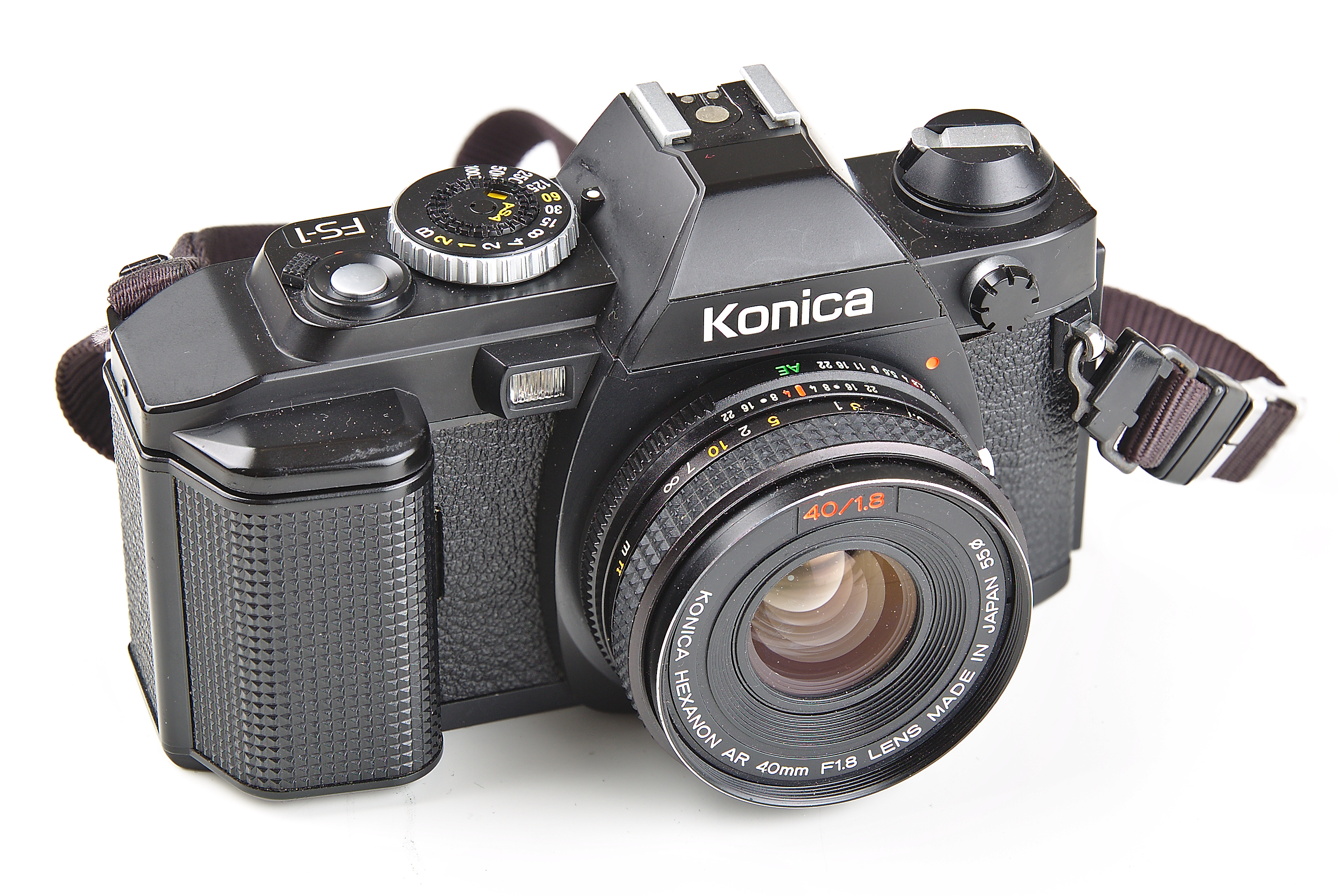
Konica FS-1, 1979, successor FT-1 reached 2 fps, built to 1987

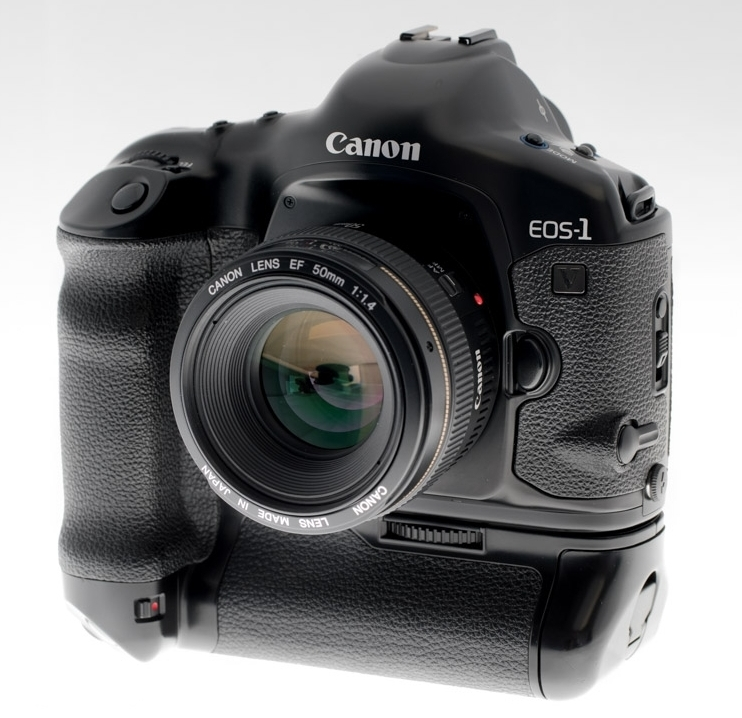
Canon EOS-1V, up to 10 fps, 2000–2008

A motor drive, in the field of photography, is a powered film transport mechanism. Historically, film loading, advancing, and rewinding were all manually driven functions.

The desires of professional photographers for more efficient shooting, particularly in sports and wildlife photography, and the desires of amateur and novice photographers for easier to use cameras both drove the development of automatic film transport. Some early developments were made with clockwork drives, but most development in the field has been in the direction of electrically driven transport.

At first, motor drives were external units that attached to the basic camera body, normally beneath it, with an interface consisting of a physical drive socket and some electrical contacts to signal the drive when to actuate. Beginning in the late 1970s, motor drives began to be integrated into cameras themselves—at first, in compact cameras for the beginner market, and by the 1980s, in amateur-grade and later professional-grade single lens reflex cameras. By the 1990s, the vast majority of 35mm cameras had integral motor drive, and the feature found its way into some medium format cameras as well.

Motor drives for compact and amateur cameras wind slowly—shot-to-shot intervals of approximately a second are commonplace. Professional grade cameras are faster, with speeds up to ten frames per second (fps). The first 35 mm SLR to achieve such a shooting speed was Nikon's F High Speed Motor Drive camera, first developed for the 1971 Chicago Photo Expo with 7 fps. To enable this speed and allow the photographer to more easily track the moving subject, this camera used a fixed, semi-transparent pellicle mirror instead of a moving mirror. Later special Canon models used similar mechanisms to achieve such speeds, while cameras with moving mirrors reached approximately five frames per second by the 1980s. Today, the fastest professional models from Canon and Nikon achieve approximately ten frames per second with a moving mirror.

In the digital camera era, some users continue to refer to continuous shooting modes as "motor drive". Many camera models refer to different shooting modes—single shot, burst, continuous, self timer—as drive modes, thus keeping alive the terminology of film. An external battery grip is occasionally referred to as a motor drive as it tends to increase the frame rate.

== See also ==
- Camera
