= Pentax MX =

35 mm manual single-lens reflex film camera

Asahi Pentax MX
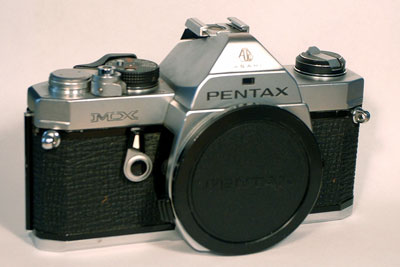
- Pentax MX

Overview
- Maker: Asahi Optical Co., Ltd.
- Type: SLR
- Released: 1976
- Production: 1976–1985

Lens
- Lens mount: K mount

Sensor/medium
- Recording medium: 135 film

Focusing
- Focus: Manual

Exposure/metering
- Exposure: Manual

Flash
- Flash: Hot shoe

Shutter
- Shutter speeds: 1 – 1/1000 s, Bulb

General
- Dimensions: 135.8×82.5×49.3 mm (5.35×3.25×1.94 in)
- Weight: 495 g (17 oz) (1.091 lb)
- Made in: Japan

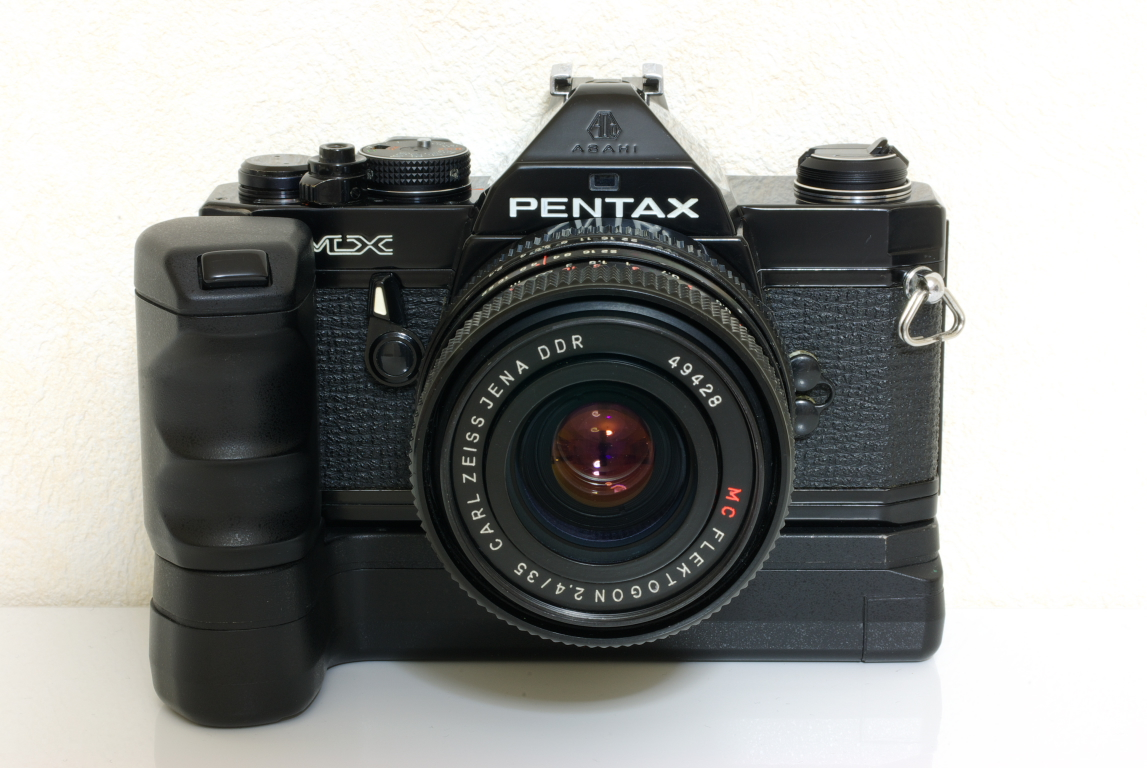
Asahi PENTAX MX (black body) & Winder MX & MC flektogon 2.4 / 35 carl zeiss jena

The Pentax MX, originally marked the Asahi Pentax MX, is a professional 35 mm single-lens reflex camera produced by Asahi Optical Co, later Pentax of Japan, between 1976 and 1985. It was Pentax's flagship professional SLR until the introduction of the Pentax LX. Internally, the MX is essentially a smaller, lighter version of the Pentax KX, and otherwise has little in common with the rest of the Pentax M-series. However, the MX was designed as the mechanical twin sister of the remarkably successful entry-level Pentax ME.

== Overview ==
The MX was the Pentax's response to a new trend towards compactness in SLR cameras begun after the Olympus OM-1 introduced in 1972. The MX is solidly built, and features a fully mechanical construction, including a mechanical shutter of the horizontal cloth type. Only the light metering system is dependent on batteries. The MX is all manual: it does not feature autofocus or autoexposure modes such as aperture-priority, shutter-speed priority, or full program.

A number of accessories were produced for the MX, including focusing screens:

- SC1: ground glass, split image device, microprism ring (standard)
- SA1: ground glass, microprism patch
- SA3: ground glass, microprism patch, for wide aperture lenses
- SB1: ground glass, split image device
- SD1: ground glass, cross collimator
- SD11: aerial image, cross collimator
- SE: ground glass
- SG: ground glass, grid
- SI: ground glass, axis

A data back, Dial Data MX, and a bulk film back were also produced, as were motorised winders Winder MX (2 frame/s) and Motor MX (5 frame/s).

Like all post-42mm screwmount Pentax cameras, the MX accepts all K-mount lenses (with the exception of the newer FA-J and DA lenses without aperture rings).

Due to its complete lack of automatic functions, but excellent array of manual controls, the MX is often selected as a camera for photography students to practice their technique. The depth-of-field preview and self-timer functions, along with its compact size, render the MX superior to the earlier and less expensive Pentax K1000.

== See also ==
- List of Pentax products

Class	1970s										1980s										1990s										2000s									
Class	0	1	2	3	4	5	6	7	8	9	0	1	2	3	4	5	6	7	8	9	0	1	2	3	4	5	6	7	8	9	0	1	2	3	4	5	6	7	8	9
Flagship																						PZ-1 (Z-1)			PZ-1p (Z-1p)							MZ-S								
Flagship																									PZ-5p (Z-5p)															
Flagship											LX																													
Flagship							MX																																	
Flagship						K2 DMD																																		
Flagship						K2																																		
Midrange																		SFX (SF-1)			SFXn (SF-1n)							MZ-3 (ZX-3)				MZ-6 (ZX-L, MZ-L)								
Midrange																	P5 (P50)									MZ-5 (ZX-5)		MZ-5n (ZX-5n)												
Midrange														Super-A (Super Program)										PZ-20p (Z-20p)						MZ-7 (ZX-7)										
Midrange														Program-A (Program Plus)										Z-50p				MZ-50 (ZX-50)			MZ-30 (ZX-30)		MZ-60 (ZX-60)							
Midrange						KX						ME F														PZ-70p (Z-70p)														
Midrange							ME			ME Super																														
Entry-level																			SF7 (SF10)								MZ-10 (ZX-10)							*ist						
Entry-level																							PZ-20 (Z-20)			PZ-70 (Z-70)														
Entry-level																						PZ-10 (Z-10)																		
Entry-level																P3 (P30)			P3n (P30n)		P3t (P30t)								MZ-M (ZX-M)											
Entry-level						KM				MV	MV 1		MG			A3 (A3000)																								
Entry-level							K1000																																	
