= Pentax DA 16-45mm lens =

Camera Lens

Pentax smc DA 16-45mm F4 ED AL
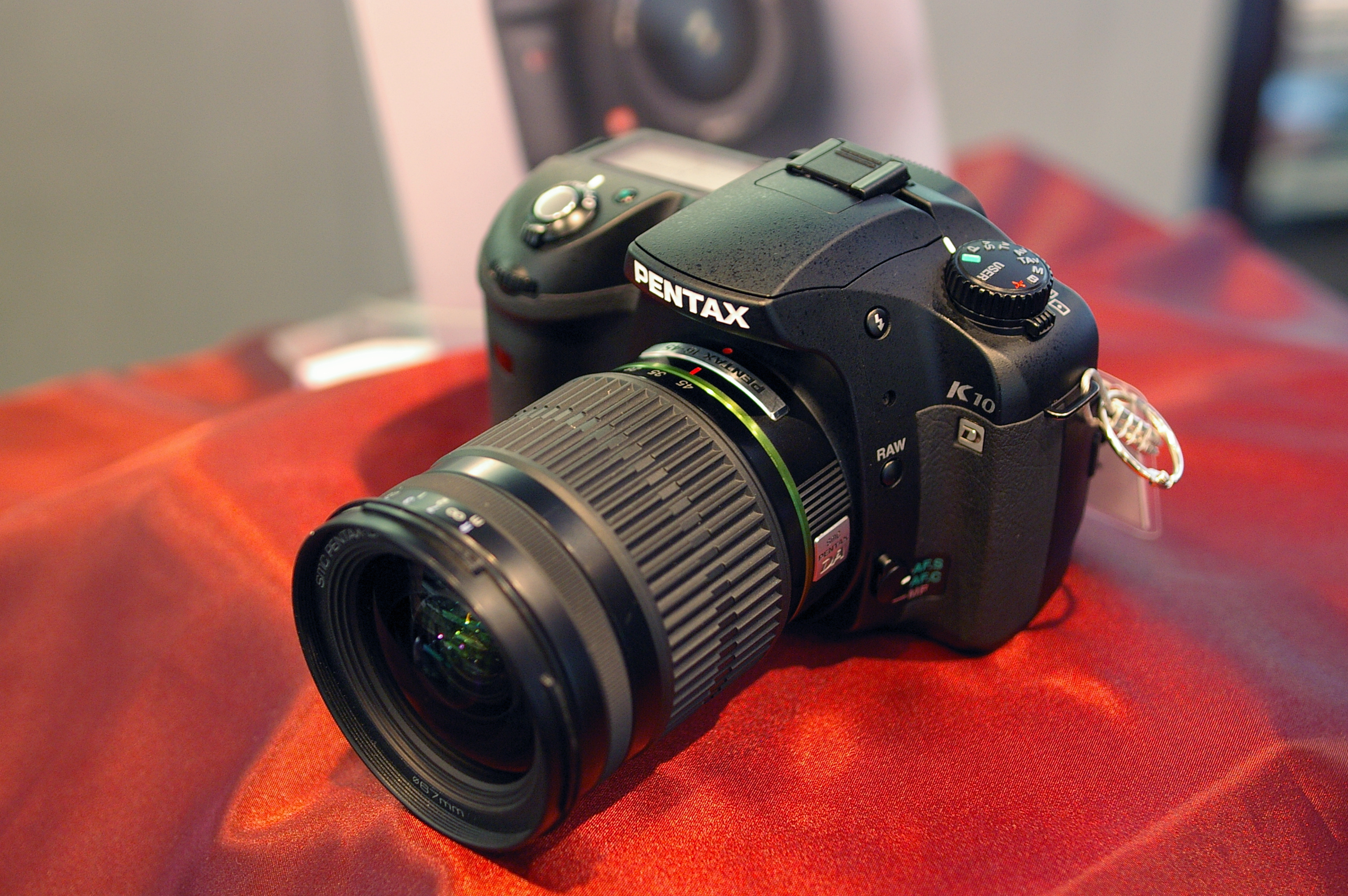
- Mounted on a Pentax K10D
- Maker: Pentax
- Lens mount(s): Pentax KAF

Technical data
- Type: Zoom
- Focus drive: Screwdrive
- Focal length: 16-45mm
- Focal length (35mm equiv.): 24-68mm
- Aperture (max/min): f/4.0 / f/22
- Close focus distance: 0.28 metres (0.92 ft)
- Max. magnification: 0.25
- Diaphragm blades: 6
- Construction: 13 elements in 10 groups

Features
- Manual focus override: Yes Yes
- Weather-sealing: No No
- Lens-based stabilization: No No
- Aperture ring: No No

Physical
- Diameter: 72 millimetres (2.8 in)
- Weight: 356 grams (0.785 lb)
- Filter diameter: 67mm

Accessories
- Lens hood: PH-RBL Petal type

History
- Introduction: 2003

The Pentax smc DA 16-45mm F4 ED AL is a standard zoom lens for Pentax K-mount, announced by Pentax on December 9, 2003. It has a constant maximum aperture of f/4.
