= Pentax MZ-D =

Prototype digital single-lens reflex camera

The Pentax MZ-D, also known by its internal code name of MR-52, was a prototype digital single-lens reflex camera from Pentax of Japan. It was announced at photokina in September 2000 and was demonstrated to the press at the Photo Marketing Association (PMA) show in January 2001. In October 2001, Pentax cancelled the camera, stating "The cost of manufacturing the prototype SLR 6-megapixel digital camera meant it was not a viable product for our target market"

The MZ-D was derived from the top-of-the-line Pentax film camera of the time, the MZ-S. To give space for the extra circuitry and battery power required for a digital camera, the MZ-D shape incorporated the size and shape of the MZ-S' optional battery booster and vertical grip. It also shared the Pentax K_{AF2} lens mount. The MZ-D was to use the same 6 megapixel (3072×2048) full 135 film frame sized (24×36 mm) CCD (model FTF3020-C) from Philips that was used by the Contax N Digital. The lack of success of that camera and the image quality problems it displayed suggest to some that Pentax may have had other reasons than cost to cancel the MZ-D project.

Michael Reichmann of The Luminous Landscape stated, "For whatever their reasons Pentax decided that they couldn't build a camera with this chip, while Contax decided to forge ahead. To save face? Possibly. We'll likely never know for sure"

In 2003, Pentax released a different design 6 MP APS-C sensor size DSLR, the Pentax *istD.

== Notes ==
| Type | Sensor | Class | 2003 | 2004 | 2005 | 2006 | | 2007 | 2008 | 2009 | 2010 | 2011 | 2012 | 2013 | 2014 | 2015 | 2016 | 2017 | 2018 | 2019 | 2020 | 2021 | 2022 | 2023 | 2024 | 2025 |
| DSLR | MF | Professional | | | | | | | | | | 645D | | | | 645Z | | | | | | | | | | |
| DSLR | FF | Professional | | | | | | | | | | | | | | | | K-1 | | K-1 II | | | | | | |
| DSLR | APS-C | High-end | | | | | | | | | | | | | | | K-3 II | | | | | | K-3 III | | | |
| DSLR | APS-C | High-end | | | | | | | | | | | | | K-3 | | | | | | | | | | | |
| DSLR | APS-C | Advanced | | | | | | | | | K-7 | K-5 | | K-5 II / K-5 IIs | | | | | | | | | | | | |
| DSLR | APS-C | Advanced | | *ist D | | | K10D | | K20D | | | | | | | | | KP | | | | | | | | |
| DSLR | APS-C | Midrange | | | | | K100D | 100DS | K200D | | | | | K-30 | K-50 | | | K-70 | | | | | | KF | | |
| DSLR | APS-C | Entry-level | | | *ist DS | *ist DS2 | | | | | | K-r | | | K-500 | K-S2 | | | | | | | | | | |
| DSLR | APS-C | Entry-level | | | *ist DL | DL2 | K110D | | | K-m/K2000 | K-x | | | | | K-S1 | | | | | | | | | | |
| MILC | APS-C | K-mount | | | | | | | | | | | K-01 | | | | | | | | | | | | | |
| MILC | 1/1.7" | Q-mount | | | | | | | | | | | | | Q7 | | | | | | | | | | | |
| MILC | 1/1.7" | Q-mount | | | | | | | | | | | | | | Q-S1 | | | | | | | | | | |
| MILC | 1/2.3" | Q-mount | | | | | | | | | | | Q | Q10 | | | | | | | | | | | | |
| DSLR | Prototypes | | MZ-D (2000); 645D Prototype (2006); AP 50th Anniv. (2007) | | | | | | | | | | | | | | | | | | | | | | | |
| Type | Sensor | Class | | | | | | | | | | | | | | | | | | | | | | | | |
| Type | Sensor | Class | 2003 | 2004 | 2005 | 2006 | | 2007 | 2008 | 2009 | 2010 | 2011 | 2012 | 2013 | 2014 | 2015 | 2016 | 2017 | 2018 | 2019 | 2020 | 2021 | 2022 | 2023 | 2024 | 2025 |
