= Pentax SFX =

Single-lens reflex camera

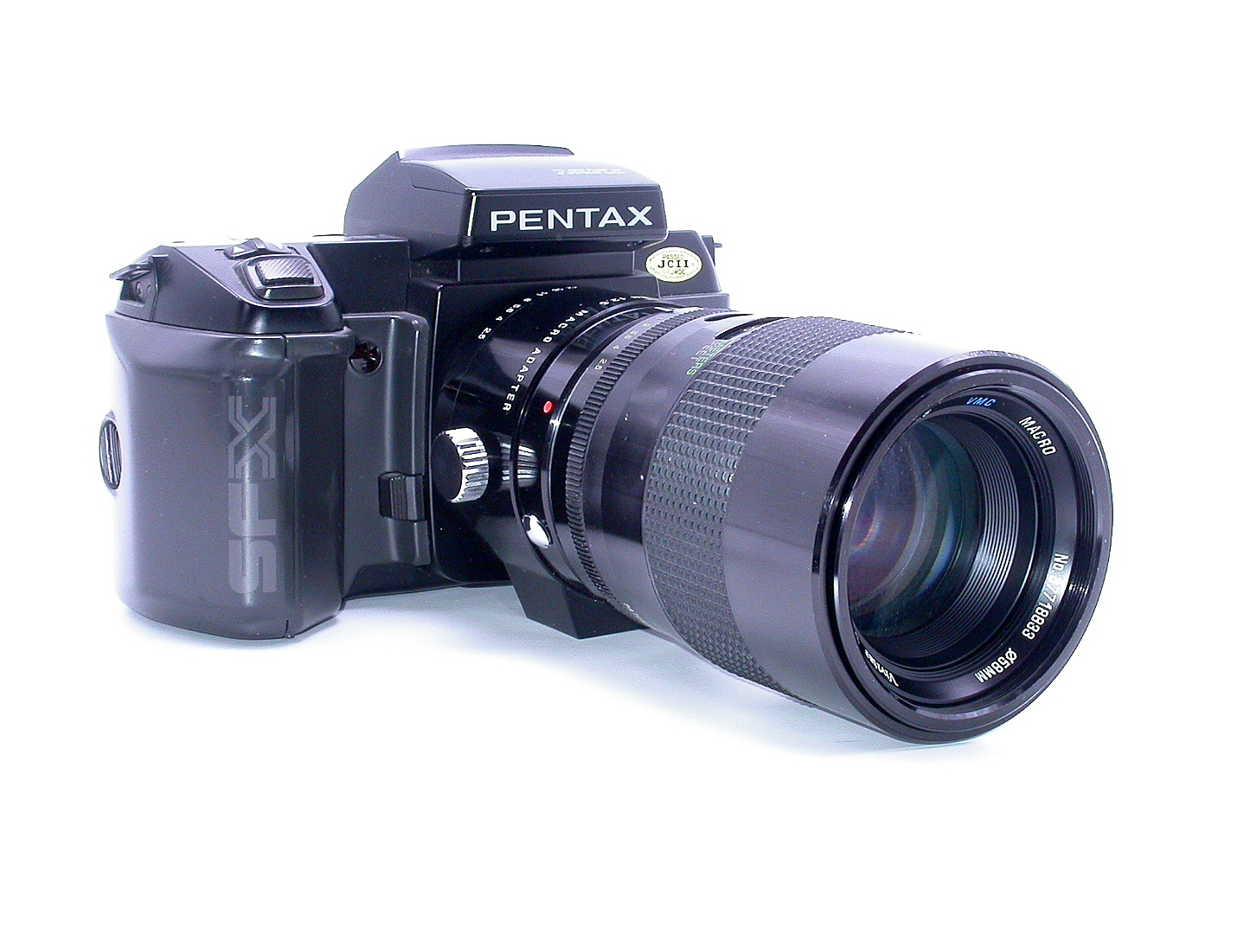

The Pentax SF-X is a camera model from the Japanese Pentax brand that was manufactured by the Asahi Optical Co., Ltd. (called PENTAX Corporation since 2002). It is also known as the Pentax SF-1 in the United States, and was first produced in 1987. It was Pentax's second Autofocus 35mm SLR after the Pentax ME F. It was the world's first AF SLR with built-in auto flash.

The SF-X comes from the same family as the slightly newer Pentax SF7/SF10.

== Features ==
- Two auto-focus modes: single shot (focus priority) or continuous (servo)
- Shutter speed range, from 30 seconds to 1/2000th sec and Bulb
- Exposure compensation
- Auto bracketing
- Interchangeable focusing screens
- Built-in diopter adjustment
- Motor drive transports at 1.8 frame/s
- Built-in Retractable TTL-Auto Flash (RTF) with AF spot beam projector

== Exclusive Accessories (from SF1 Camera Sales Brochure) ==
- Interval Data Back F
- Data Back F
- "AA" Battery Grip SF1
- Hotshoe Adapter F
- Cable Switch F
- Infrared Remote Release Cord F

== See also ==
- List of Pentax products

Class	1970s										1980s										1990s										2000s									
Class	0	1	2	3	4	5	6	7	8	9	0	1	2	3	4	5	6	7	8	9	0	1	2	3	4	5	6	7	8	9	0	1	2	3	4	5	6	7	8	9
Flagship																						PZ-1 (Z-1)			PZ-1p (Z-1p)							MZ-S								
Flagship																									PZ-5p (Z-5p)															
Flagship											LX																													
Flagship							MX																																	
Flagship						K2 DMD																																		
Flagship						K2																																		
Midrange																		SFX (SF-1)			SFXn (SF-1n)							MZ-3 (ZX-3)				MZ-6 (ZX-L, MZ-L)								
Midrange																	P5 (P50)									MZ-5 (ZX-5)		MZ-5n (ZX-5n)												
Midrange														Super-A (Super Program)										PZ-20p (Z-20p)						MZ-7 (ZX-7)										
Midrange														Program-A (Program Plus)										Z-50p				MZ-50 (ZX-50)			MZ-30 (ZX-30)		MZ-60 (ZX-60)							
Midrange						KX						ME F														PZ-70p (Z-70p)														
Midrange							ME			ME Super																														
Entry-level																			SF7 (SF10)								MZ-10 (ZX-10)							*ist						
Entry-level																							PZ-20 (Z-20)			PZ-70 (Z-70)														
Entry-level																						PZ-10 (Z-10)																		
Entry-level																P3 (P30)			P3n (P30n)		P3t (P30t)								MZ-M (ZX-M)											
Entry-level						KM				MV	MV 1		MG			A3 (A3000)																								
Entry-level							K1000																																	
