= Contax N Digital =

Overview
- Type: digital single-lens reflex camera

Lens
- Lens: Contax N-mount

Sensor/medium
- Sensor: Philips 6 MP CCD
- Maximum resolution: 3040 x 2008
- Film speed: 25–400
- Storage media: Compact Flash (Type I or II)

Exposure/metering
- Exposure metering: Multi-Segment, Center weighted, Spot

Shutter
- Shutter speed range: 32sec-1/8000sec

General
- Battery: 1.5V AA x 4

The Contax N Digital was a six-megapixel digital SLR camera produced by Contax in Japan. The camera was announced in late 2000, and began to be sold in spring 2002, after several delays. The camera received mixed reviews from the press, and was withdrawn from the market within a year of its introduction.

It was noteworthy for being the first full-frame digital SLR, with an imaging chip the full size of a 135 film frame. All previous digital SLRs had a smaller sensor, giving a cropped view (see magnification factor). The imaging sensor was a Philips FTF3020-C, which had previously been used in the Jenoptik Eyelike medium format digital back. Pentax also planned to use the sensor in a full-frame digital SLR, the Pentax MZ-D, but abandoned work on the prototype in late 2001. The sensor featured ISO settings as low as ISO 25, but the reviews noted that it had a relatively high noise level above ISO 100. The next full-frame digital SLRs were the Canon EOS-1Ds of late 2002, followed by Kodak's DCS Pro 14n in 2003. Nikon and Sony introduced full-frame models in 2007 and 2008 respectively.

The N Digital was based on the short-lived Contax N range of 35mm film SLRs, and used the Contax N-mount lens system. Nine lenses were produced for this mount, by Carl Zeiss. There were three Contax N-Mount cameras – two 35mm film SLR bodies, plus the N Digital – all of which are now discontinued.

Contax's parent company Kyocera withdrew from the digital imaging market in 2005.
