= HD Pentax DA 16-85mm F3.5-5.6 ED DC WR =

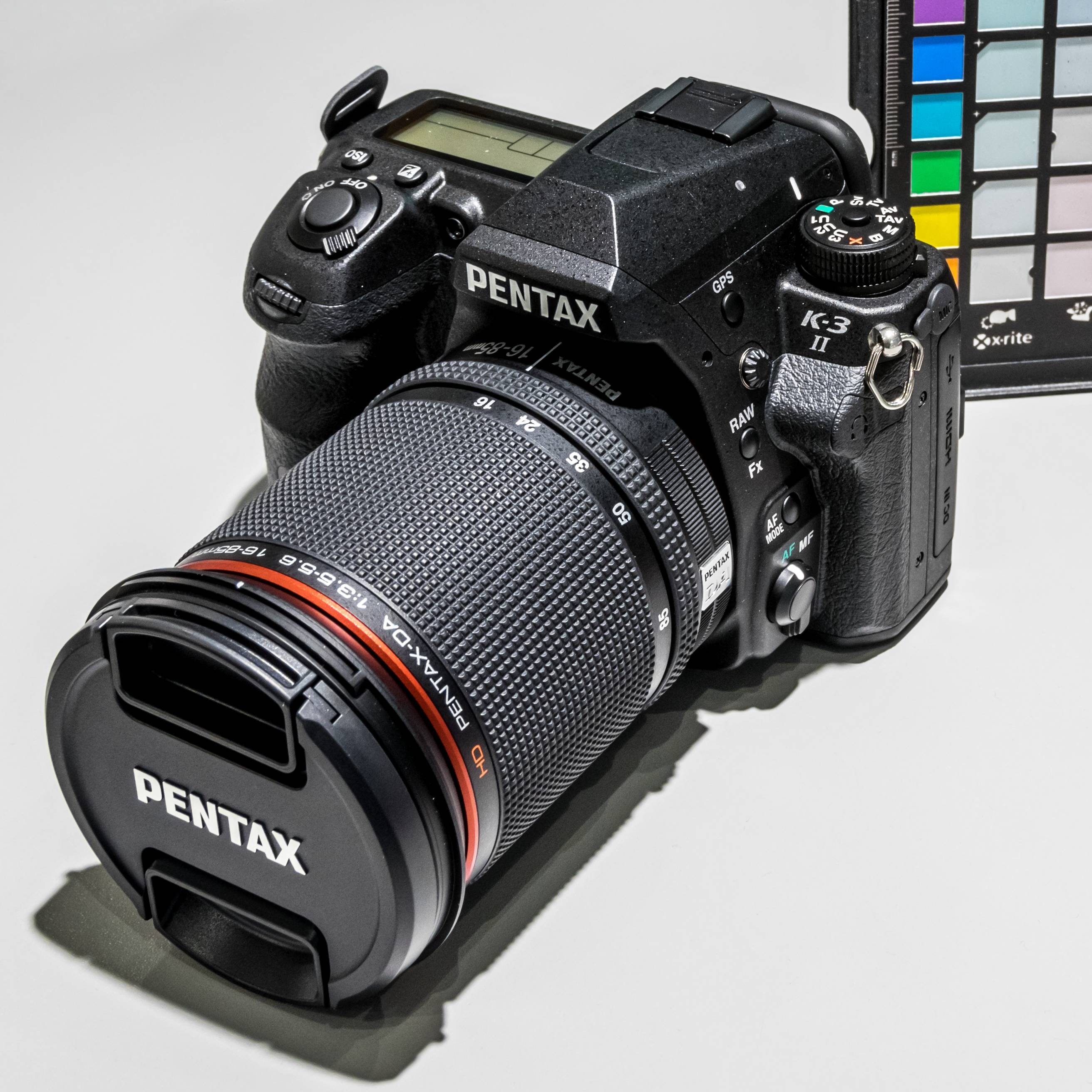
- Mounted on a Pentax K-3 II
- Maker: Ricoh Imaging
- Lens mount(s): Pentax K mount

Technical data
- Type: Zoom
- Focus drive: Brushless DC motor
- Focal length: 16-85mm
- Focal length (35mm equiv.): 24.5-130mm
- Crop factor: 1.53
- Aperture (max/min): f/3.5-5.6 to f/22-38
- Close focus distance: 0.35 metres (1.1 ft)
- Max. magnification: 0.26
- Diaphragm blades: 7, rounded
- Construction: 16 elements in 12 groups

Features
- Manual focus override: Yes Yes
- Weather-sealing: Yes Yes
- Lens-based stabilization: No No
- Unique features: HD coating
- Application: Versatile

Physical
- Diameter: 78 millimetres (3.1 in)
- Weight: 488 grams (1.076 lb)
- Filter diameter: 72mm

Accessories
- Lens hood: PH-RBA 72mm
- Case: S90-140

Angle of view
- Diagonal: 83°-19°

History
- Introduction: 2014

Retail info
- MSRP: 649.95 USD

The HD Pentax DA 16-85mm F3.5-5.6 ED DC WR is an advanced standard zoom lens for K mount. It is made by Ricoh under the Pentax brand, and was announced on October 29, 2014.
