= SF7 =

SF7 or variation may refer to:

- USS Argonaut (SF-7), U.S. Navy V-4_class submarine
- Pentax SF7, 35mm SLR camera
- SF Motors SF7, sport utility sedan
- .SF7, image ROM format file extension for the SF-7000
