= Pentax *ist DS =

Digital SLR camera produced by Pentax

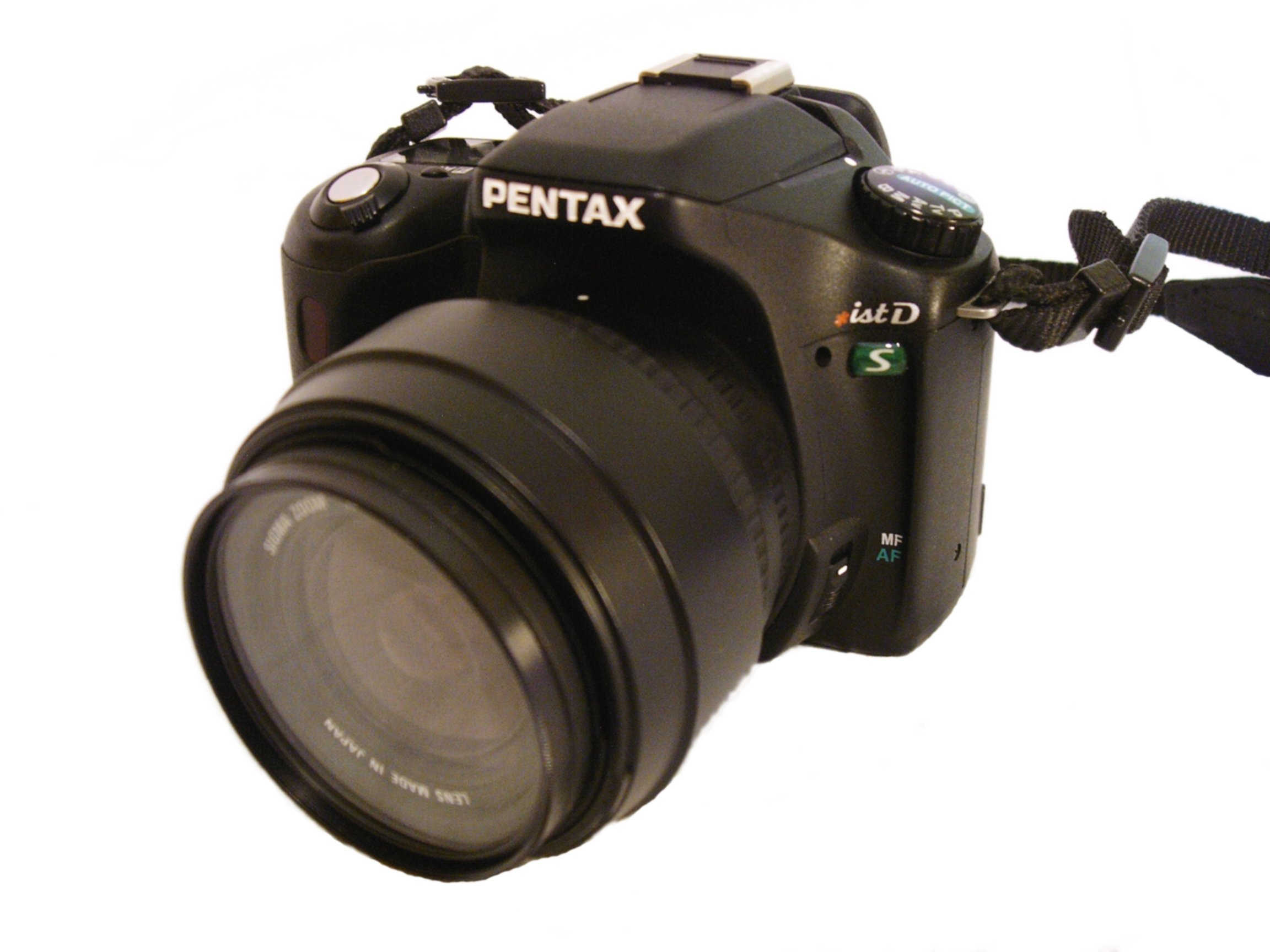
- Front view of the Pentax *ist DS (zoomed), a digital SLR camera.

Overview
- Maker: Pentax
- Type: DSLR

Lens
- Lens mount: Pentax KAF bayonet mount

Sensor/medium
- Sensor type: CCD
- Sensor size: 6.1 megapixel
- Maximum resolution: 3008 x 2008
- Recording medium: SD/MMC card

Focusing
- Focus: autofocus, manual

Flash
- Flash: built-in, hot shoe

Shutter
- Frame rate: 2.8 fps for 8 frames
- Shutter speeds: 30 s - 1/4000 s

Viewfinder
- Viewfinder: pentaprism, 95%, 0.95x

General
- LCD screen: 2.0 " TFT LCD, 210,000 pixels
- Battery: 4 AA
- Data port: USB
- Dimensions: 129×95×60 mm (5.1×3.7×2.4 in)
- Weight: 605 g (21 oz) w/ battery

PENTAX *ist DS is a digital SLR camera produced by Pentax. The *ist DS produces a 6.1 megapixel resolution image. The *ist DS was a lower-prices follow-on to the Pentax *ist D. In September 2005 the Digital Imaging Websites Association (DIWA), a worldwide organization of collaborating websites, announced that Pentax had received their first DIWA Award for a DSLR camera. The *ist DS model was awarded with a Silver medal for outstanding test results.

== Description ==
As with other Pentax DSLRs, the *ist DS uses the Pentax KAF bayonet mount and can use older lenses using the KA-mount without limitations. Original K mount lenses and other adapted manual focus lenses can be used in manual mode by selecting a menu option. Centre-weighted metering, aperture priority and focus indication are maintained, even with adapter mounted lenses. When using non-auto aperture lenses, a press of the AE-L button with the camera in manual mode will meter the scene and set the shutter speed. Some non-Pentax K-mount lenses have been reported not to mount on the camera, because a plate protecting the aperture stop-down lever is slightly deeper.

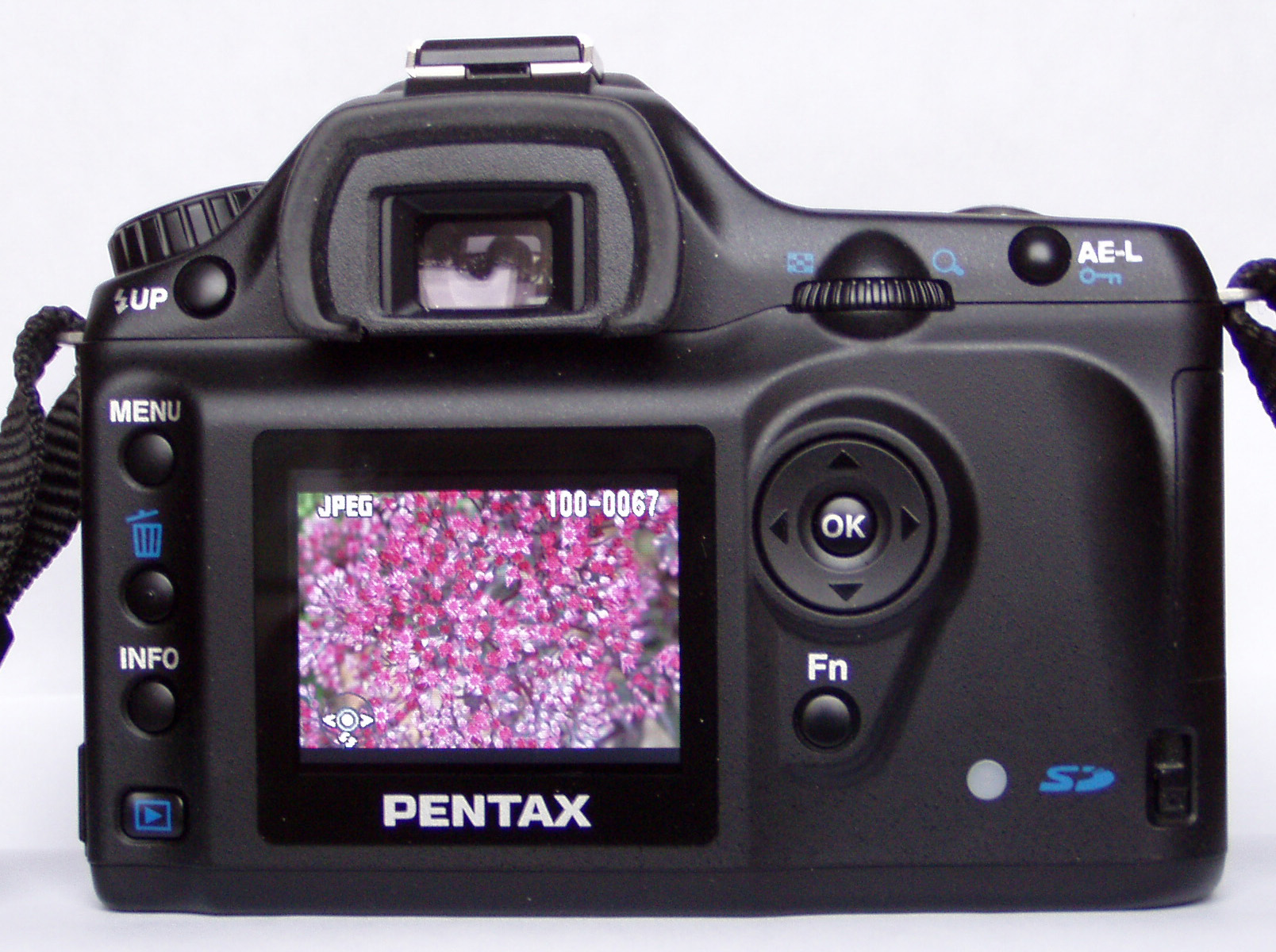
Rear view of the Pentax *ist Ds

Along with the other D-series Pentax DSLRs, the Pentax *ist DS, Pentax *ist DS2, and Pentax *ist D have TTL-mode (not only P-TTL) for external flash. This allows the photographer to use cheaper TTL flashes rather than the current offerings from Pentax and Samsung with 'pre-flash' operation, which can cause some subjects to blink. Unlike red-eye reduction pre-flash, the P-TTL pre-flash for metering purposes fires only a brief moment before the main flash. Looking through the viewfinder, it can be seen before the mirror flips up.

Firmware version 2.02 adds SDHC cards support, continuous AF support, and auto ISO mode (selectable from 200–400, 200–800, 200–1600, 200–3200 ISO).

== Pentax *ist DS2 ==
Introduced in 2005, the Pentax *ist DS2 is a minor upgrade to the original model that increased the size of the rear LCD from 2.0" to 2.5".

Type	Sensor	Class	2003	2004	2005	2006		2007	2008	2009	2010	2011	2012	2013	2014	2015	2016	2017	2018	2019	2020	2021	2022	2023	2024	2025
DSLR	MF	Professional										645D				645Z										
DSLR	FF	Professional																K-1		K-1 II						
DSLR	APS-C	High-end															K-3 II						K-3 III			
DSLR	APS-C	High-end													K-3											
DSLR	APS-C	Advanced									K-7	K-5		K-5 II / K-5 IIs												
DSLR	APS-C	Advanced		*ist D			K10D		K20D									KP								
DSLR	APS-C	Midrange					K100D	100DS	K200D					K-30	K-50			K-70						KF		
DSLR	APS-C	Entry-level			*ist DS	*ist DS2						K-r			K-500	K-S2										
DSLR	APS-C	Entry-level			*ist DL	DL2	K110D			K-m/K2000	K-x					K-S1										
MILC	APS-C	K-mount											K-01													
MILC	1/1.7"	Q-mount													Q7											
MILC	1/1.7"	Q-mount														Q-S1										
MILC	1/2.3"	Q-mount											Q	Q10												
DSLR	Prototypes		MZ-D (2000); 645D Prototype (2006); AP 50th Anniv. (2007)																							
Type	Sensor	Class																								
Type	Sensor	Class	2003	2004	2005	2006		2007	2008	2009	2010	2011	2012	2013	2014	2015	2016	2017	2018	2019	2020	2021	2022	2023	2024	2025
