= Pentax DA 20-40mm Limited lens =

HD Pentax-DA 20-40mm F2.8-4 ED Limited DC WR
- Maker: Ricoh Imaging
- Lens mount(s): Pentax KAF3

Technical data
- Type: Zoom
- Focus drive: Brushless DC motor
- Focal length: 20-40mm
- Aperture (max/min): f/2.8 - f/4.0
- Close focus distance: 0.28 metres (0.92 ft)
- Max. magnification: 0.2
- Diaphragm blades: 9
- Construction: 9 elements in 8 groups

Features
- Manual focus override: Yes Yes
- Weather-sealing: Yes Yes
- Lens-based stabilization: No No
- Aperture ring: No No

Physical
- Diameter: 71 millimetres (2.8 in)
- Weight: 283 grams (0.624 lb)
- Filter diameter: 55mm

Accessories
- Lens hood: MH-RA55

History
- Introduction: 2013

The HD Pentax-DA 20-40mm F2.8-4 ED Limited DC WR is an advanced standard zoom lens for Pentax APS-C DSLR cameras announced by Ricoh on November 6, 2013. Being part of Pentax's Limited series, it features a metal barrel and a comparably small form factor. Within the Limited series, it is the first zoom lens as well as the first lens to feature a silent built-in autofocus motor (DC) and weather resistance (WR).
