= Pentax MZ-S =

35mm single-lens reflex camera

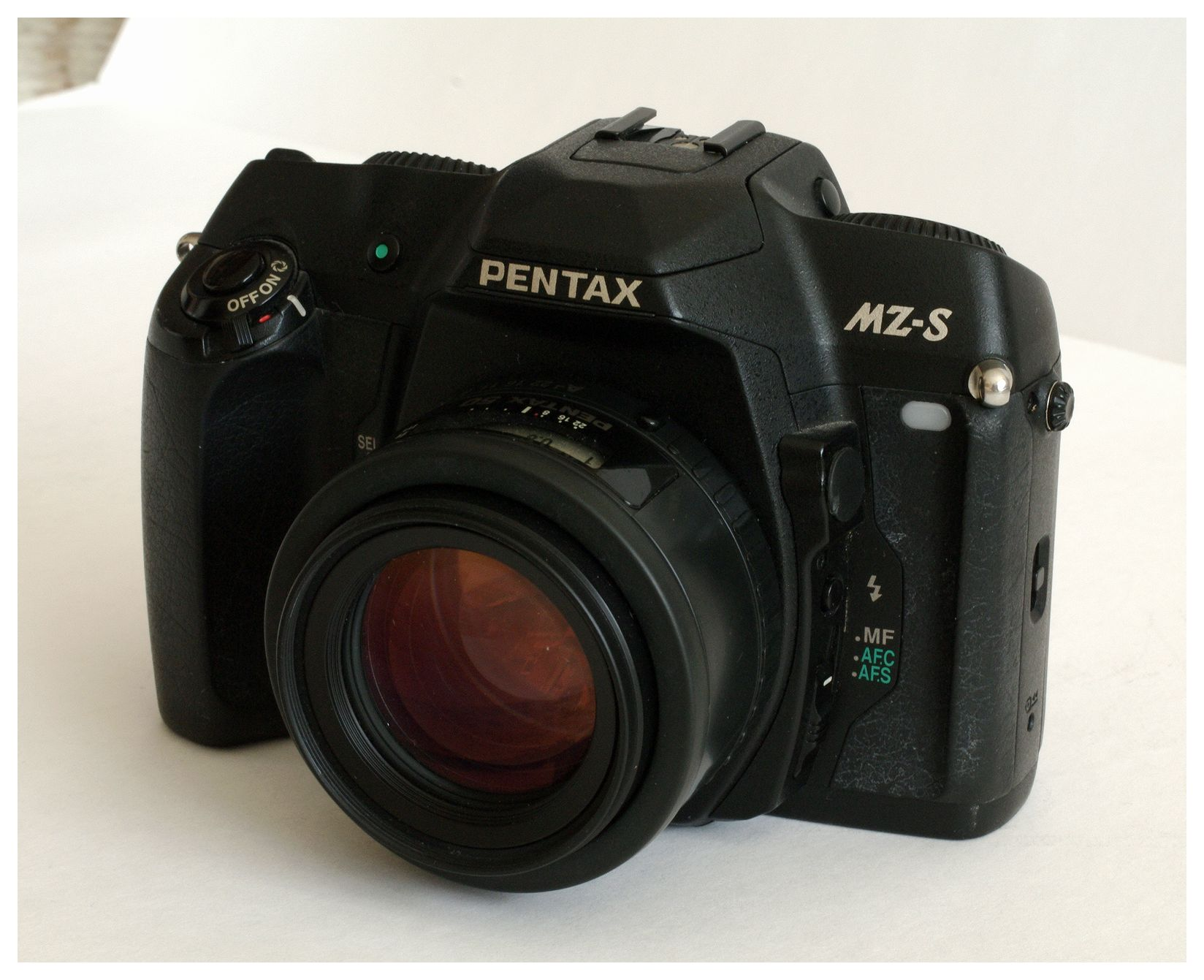

Overview
- Maker: Asahi Optical Co., Ltd.
- Type: SLR
- Released: 2001
- Production: 2001–2006

Lens
- Lens mount: KAF2

Sensor/medium
- Recording medium: 135 film
- Film advance: Automatic

Focusing
- Focus modes: Autofocus Single, Autofocus Continuous, Manual Focus

Exposure/metering
- Exposure modes: Program, Aperture Priority, Shutter Priority, Manual
- Exposure metering: TTL open-aperture 6-segment meter

Flash
- Flash: Retractible 24mm coverage, Guide number 12 at 100 ISO
- Flash synchronization: 1/180 sec
- Compatible flashes: Flashes with Pentax Proprietary Hotshoe

Shutter
- Shutter: Electronically controlled vertical focal-plane shutter
- Shutter speed range: 1/6000 sec. - 30 sec
- Continuous shooting: 2.5 fps

Viewfinder
- Viewfinder: Pentaprism
- Viewfinder magnification: 0.75x
- Frame coverage: 92%

General
- Battery: 2 x CR2
- Dimensions: 136.5 x 95.0 x 64.0 mm
- Weight: 520g
- Made in: Japan

The Pentax MZ-S is a 35mm single-lens reflex camera from Pentax of Japan. It was introduced in 2001 and discontinued in February 2006. It is closely related to the prototype MZ-D Full-frame digital SLR, which never entered production. It was the top-of-the-line model of Pentax's MZ/ZX series and replaced the PZ-1p as the high-end Pentax camera. No camera was produced to replace the MZ-S, making it Pentax's last high-end 35 mm camera. The MZ-S is the last film camera from Pentax that was manufactured in Japan.

== Design ==
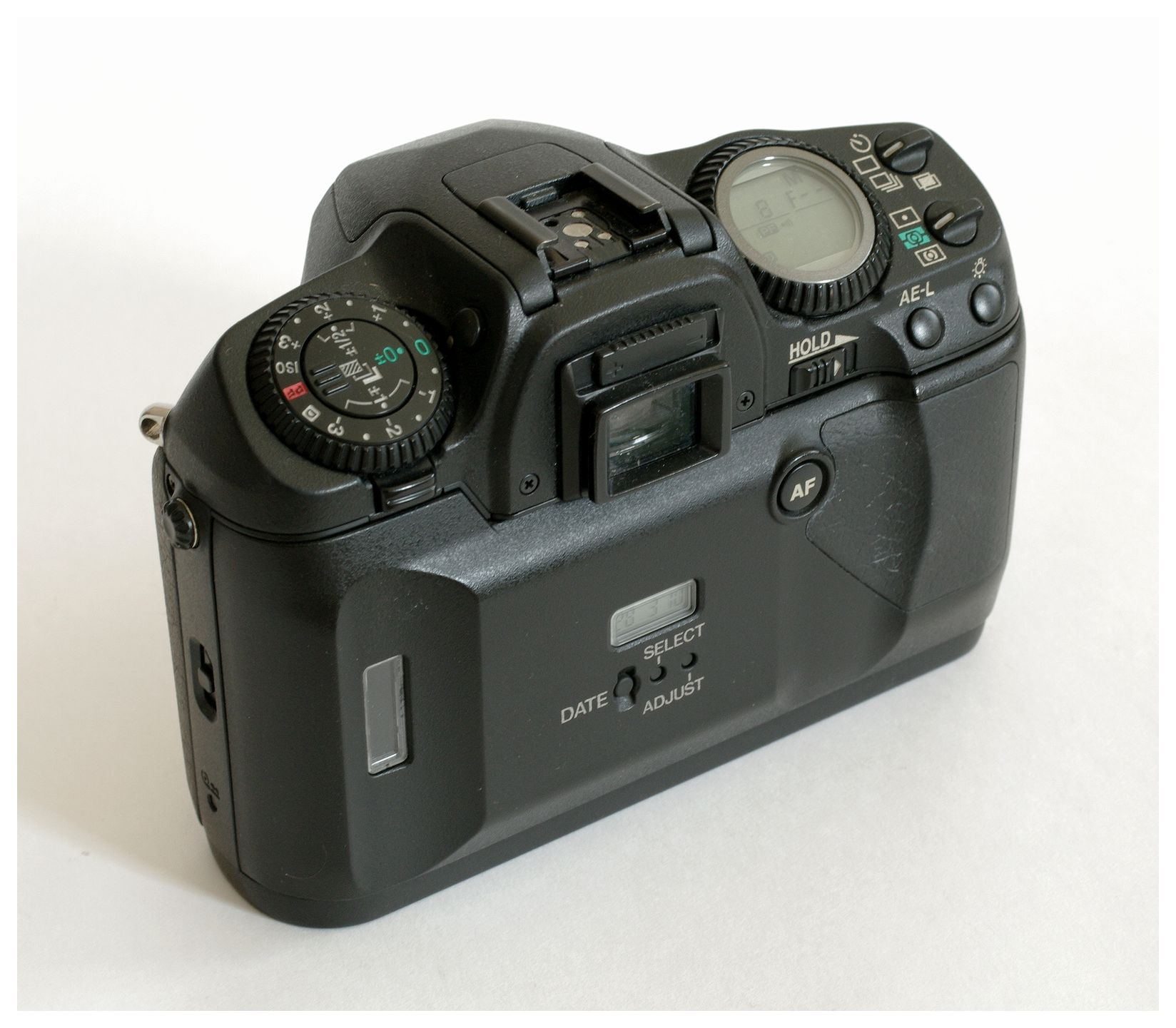

The MZ-S was a "clean sheet of paper" design that re-thought most aspects of Pentax's camera interface and appearance. Design goals included simpler operation, small size and light weight without sacrificing the sophisticated features required to be competitive. The MZ-S design returned to a more conventional one compared to the PZ-1p; the shoe for external flash and accessories returned to the top of the pentaprism housing, instead of the unusual right-handgrip position used on the older camera. The status LCD moved from atop the pentaprism to the top of the camera's right shoulder, like many competing designs. However, instead of a flat camera top, the Pentax designers angled the top plate towards the user at a 30° angle for easier viewing.

The camera featured an autofocus system based on six linear CCD sensors, on-film data recording and an MTF autoexposure mode which chooses the aperture for maximum sharpness.

== See also ==
- Pentax cameras

| Class | 1970s | | | | | | | | | | 1980s | | | | | | | | | | 1990s | | | | | | | | | | 2000s | | | | | | | | | |
| Class | 0 | 1 | 2 | 3 | 4 | 5 | 6 | 7 | 8 | 9 | 0 | 1 | 2 | 3 | 4 | 5 | 6 | 7 | 8 | 9 | 0 | 1 | 2 | 3 | 4 | 5 | 6 | 7 | 8 | 9 | 0 | 1 | 2 | 3 | 4 | 5 | 6 | 7 | 8 | 9 |
| Flagship | | | | | | | | | | | | | | | | | | | | | | PZ-1 (Z-1) | | | PZ-1p (Z-1p) | | | | | | | MZ-S | | | | | | | | |
| Flagship | | | | | | | | | | | | | | | | | | | | | | | | | PZ-5p (Z-5p) | | | | | | | | | | | | | | | |
| Flagship | | | | | | | | | | | LX | | | | | | | | | | | | | | | | | | | | | | | | | | | | | |
| Flagship | | | | | | | MX | | | | | | | | | | | | | | | | | | | | | | | | | | | | | | | | | |
| Flagship | | | | | | K2 DMD | | | | | | | | | | | | | | | | | | | | | | | | | | | | | | | | | | |
| Flagship | | | | | | K2 | | | | | | | | | | | | | | | | | | | | | | | | | | | | | | | | | | |
| Midrange | | | | | | | | | | | | | | | | | | SFX (SF-1) | | | SFXn (SF-1n) | | | | | | | MZ-3 (ZX-3) | | | | MZ-6 (ZX-L, MZ-L) | | | | | | | | |
| Midrange | | | | | | | | | | | | | | | | | P5 (P50) | | | | | | | | | MZ-5 (ZX-5) | | MZ-5n (ZX-5n) | | | | | | | | | | | | |
| Midrange | | | | | | | | | | | | | | Super-A (Super Program) | | | | | | | | | | PZ-20p (Z-20p) | | | | | | MZ-7 (ZX-7) | | | | | | | | | | |
| Midrange | | | | | | | | | | | | | | Program-A (Program Plus) | | | | | | | | | | Z-50p | | | | MZ-50 (ZX-50) | | | MZ-30 (ZX-30) | | MZ-60 (ZX-60) | | | | | | | |
| Midrange | | | | | | KX | | | | | | ME F | | | | | | | | | | | | | | PZ-70p (Z-70p) | | | | | | | | | | | | | | |
| Midrange | | | | | | | ME | | | ME Super | | | | | | | | | | | | | | | | | | | | | | | | | | | | | | |
| Entry-level | | | | | | | | | | | | | | | | | | | SF7 (SF10) | | | | | | | | MZ-10 (ZX-10) | | | | | | | *ist | | | | | | |
| Entry-level | | | | | | | | | | | | | | | | | | | | | | | PZ-20 (Z-20) | | | PZ-70 (Z-70) | | | | | | | | | | | | | | |
| Entry-level | | | | | | | | | | | | | | | | | | | | | | PZ-10 (Z-10) | | | | | | | | | | | | | | | | | | |
| Entry-level | | | | | | | | | | | | | | | | P3 (P30) | | | P3n (P30n) | | P3t (P30t) | | | | | | | | MZ-M (ZX-M) | | | | | | | | | | | |
| Entry-level | | | | | | KM | | | | MV | MV 1 | | MG | | | A3 (A3000) | | | | | | | | | | | | | | | | | | | | | | | | |
| Entry-level | | | | | | | K1000 | | | | | | | | | | | | | | | | | | | | | | | | | | | | | | | | | |
