= Pentax DA 17-70mm lens =

Camera lens

Pentax smc DA 17-70mm F4.0 AL (IF) SDM
- Maker: Pentax
- Lens mount(s): Pentax KAF3

Technical data
- Type: Zoom
- Focus drive: Ultrasonic
- Focal length: 17-70mm
- Aperture (max/min): f/4.0
- Close focus distance: 0.28 metres (0.92 ft)
- Max. magnification: 0.31
- Diaphragm blades: 7
- Construction: 17 elements in 12 groups

Features
- Manual focus override: Yes Yes
- Weather-sealing: No No
- Lens-based stabilization: No No
- Aperture ring: No No

Physical
- Diameter: 75 millimetres (3.0 in)
- Weight: 485 grams (1.069 lb)
- Filter diameter: 67mm

History
- Introduction: 2008

The Pentax smc DA 17-70mm F4.0 AL (IF) SDM is a constant maximum aperture standard zoom lens announced by Pentax on June 3, 2008.
