= Pentax K20D =

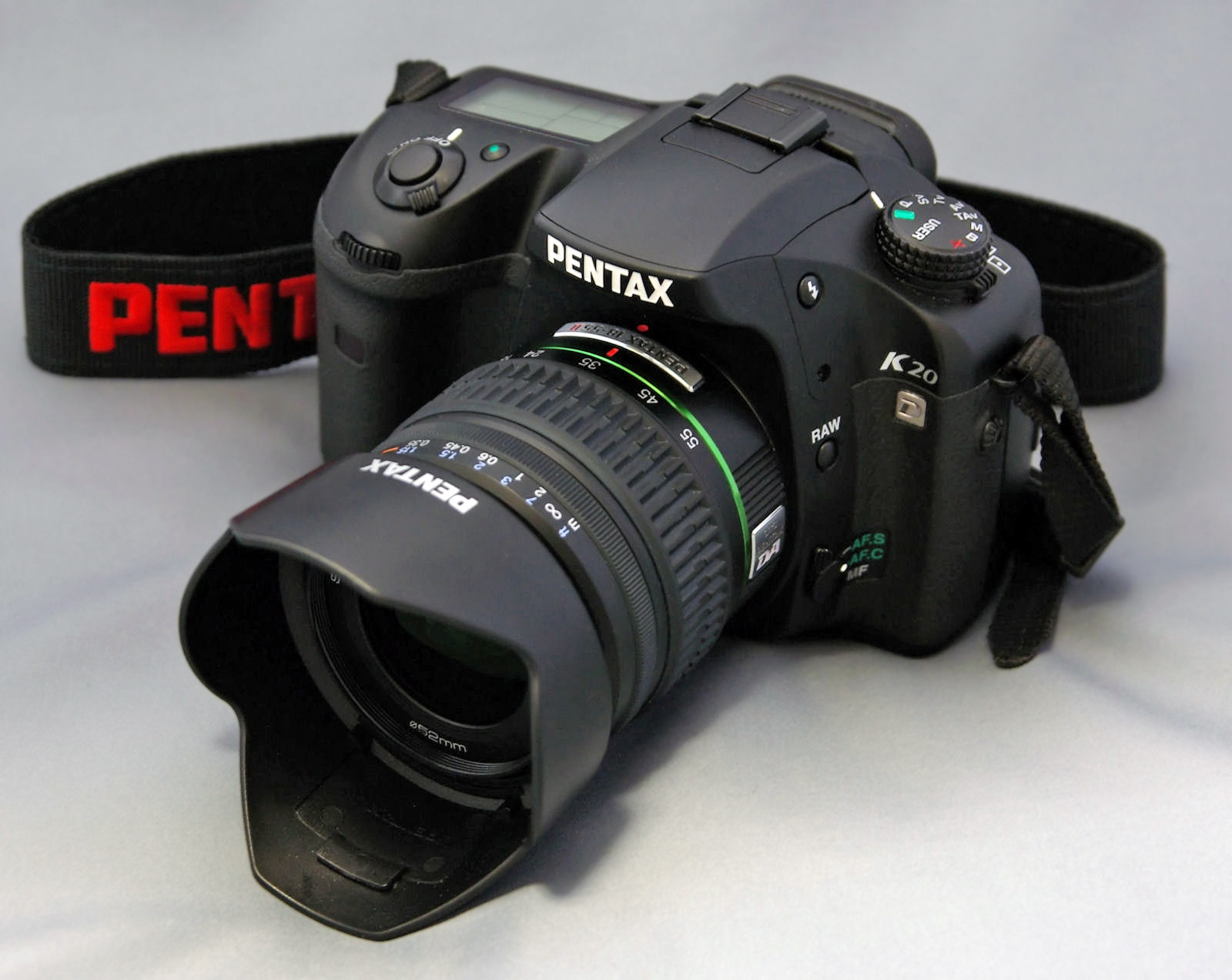

Overview
- Maker: Pentax
- Type: digital single-lens reflex camera

Lens
- Lens: Interchangeable Pentax K_{AF2} mount compatible with Pentax auto-aperture lenses; older lenses supported in stop-down metering mode.

Sensor/medium
- Sensor: CMOS active pixel sensor with a primary color filter
- Maximum resolution: 14.6 megapixels
- Film speed: ISO Auto, 100, 200, 400, 800, 1600, 3200, boosted: 6400
- Recording medium: SD, SDHC

Exposure/metering
- Exposure modes: Program, Sensitivity Priority, Shutter-Speed Priority, Aperture Priority, Shutter-Speed and Aperture Priority, Manual, Bulb
- Exposure metering: TTL open-aperture metering with choice of: 16-segment, center-weighted & spot meter

Shutter
- Shutter speed range: 1/4000 s – 30 s, Bulb

General
- LCD screen: 2.7″, 230,000 pixels
- Battery: Rechargeable D-LI50 Lithium-ion battery, Optional AC adapter
- Weight: 715 g (25.2 oz) without battery, 790 g (28 oz) with battery
- Made in: Philippines

The Pentax K20D and its clone, the Samsung GX-20, are 14.6 megapixel digital single-lens reflex cameras manufactured by Pentax that were announced on January 23, 2008. The K20D was available in the U.S. market from February 2008 through autumn 2009.

The K20D and GX-20 bodies were developed by Pentax, while the CMOS sensor was manufactured by Samsung - a result of a partnership begun in 2005. Although both cameras share similar hardware, each camera has its own design, firmware, and image processing algorithms. The K20D is the first Pentax DSLR with a CMOS image sensor co-developed by Pentax and Samsung. Samsung's expertise in sensor design is seen as a major benefit to Pentax, which did not release its first DSLR until 2003, when most other camera manufacturers had already established themselves in the growing digital SLR market.

At the time of their release, the K20D and GX-20 had the highest resolution sensor in the APS-C image sensor format at 14.6 megapixels. In 2009, Pentax announced the K-7, the successor to the K20D, with a modified CMOS sensor, smaller design, and many new features including HD video recording.

The latest firmware release, version 1.04, was made available in April 2010. It solved issues with certain SDHC memory cards. The previous firmware update, version 1.03, was made available in April 2009 and improved Shake Reduction (SR) accuracy as well as autofocus performance in some conditions. Users can download firmware updates from the Pentax website.

== Features ==
The K20D is the successor to the well-reviewed Pentax K10D prosumer DSLR. The K20D was released alongside the Pentax K200D, a substantial upgrade of the entry-level Pentax K100D. Relative to its predecessor, the K20D offers:

- a CMOS image sensor with:
  - higher resolution (14.6 megapixels vs. 10.2 megapixels for the K10D)
  - higher sensitivity, up to ISO 6400 equivalent (vs. ISO 1600 for the K10D)
- a slightly larger, higher-resolution, main LCD screen with live view and which can be color-calibrated via custom settings
- a more versatile continuous shooting mode, offering a choice between 3 frames/s at full resolution and 21 frames/s at 1.6-megapixel resolution.
- the option to take a series of bracketed shots with one shutter press.
- an improved autofocus and shake reduction system
- a new Dust Alert feature, which scans the sensor for dust particles and highlights their locations for ease of removal
- dynamic range enhancement by 1 EV
- ability to adjust the AF offset to solve front/back focus problems for up to 20 individual lenses
- an X-sync socket for studio flash control
- a new higher-quality (and less-compressed) “★★★★” setting for JPEG images
- selectable levels of in-camera noise reduction
- a separate option for levels of edge sharpening in JPEG images, addressing a frequent complaint in reviews of the K10D
- Portrait, Landscape, Vibrant, and Monochrome image tone settings in addition to Bright and Natural
- optional automatic fine adjustment of white balance even when the type of light source is manually selected
- Customizable filename prefixes, allowing one to easily distinguish between files from multiple K20Ds
- In-camera hot-pixel mapping
- A trap-focus feature which works with some autofocus lenses (the pentax DA and FA lenses that have an MF/AF switch on the lens - see p. 112 of the K20D manual).
- Interval shooting option allows up to 99 images to be captured at chosen intervals and at a chosen start time.

As of August 2009, the MSRP of the K20D body in the U.S market was $629. The price with a DA 18-55mm f/3.5-5.6 II lens kit was $699.

== Samsung GX-20 ==
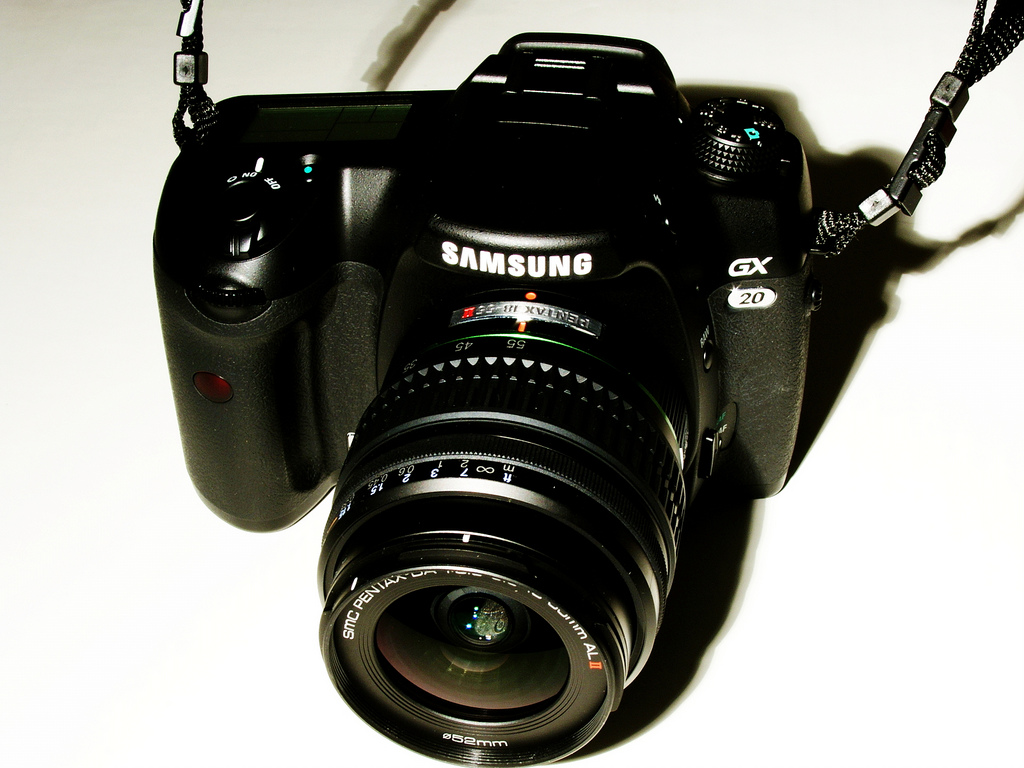
Samsung GX-20 with Pentax-branded kit lens

Under a partnership between Pentax and Samsung Techwin, the K20D was also available as the Samsung GX-20. The two cameras are virtually identical with a few small differences. Button text labels on the GX-20 use a slightly smaller font, while the buttons themselves are slightly different in shape and placement. In addition, the hand grip is a slightly different shape, meaning that the battery grip for the K20D is incompatible with the GX-20. A separate GX-20 battery grip was available.

The firmware of the Samsung GX-20 is also different, using different menus and symbols. It also lacks support for the Pentax PEF raw image format, reportedly opting for Adobe's raw format instead. The JPEG image processing of the GX-20 is reportedly different from that of the K20D. Samsung based its firmware updates for the GX-20 on those Pentax created for the K20D, introducing versions 1.01 and 1.03 shortly after Pentax released the corresponding updates for the K20D. Samsung ceased update support for the GX-20 before Pentax released firmware version 1.04 for the K20D, and thus did not develop or release a corresponding version 1.04 for the GX-20. While a K20D with firmware 1.04 installed will read and write to a 32 GB SDHC card, a GX-20 fully updated with firmware version 1.03 will only address SDHC cards up to 16 GB. Pentax K20D firmware updates cannot be installed on the GX-20.

| Type | Sensor | Class | 2003 | 2004 | 2005 | 2006 | | 2007 | 2008 | 2009 | 2010 | 2011 | 2012 | 2013 | 2014 | 2015 | 2016 | 2017 | 2018 | 2019 | 2020 | 2021 | 2022 | 2023 | 2024 | 2025 |
| DSLR | MF | Professional | | | | | | | | | | 645D | | | | 645Z | | | | | | | | | | |
| DSLR | FF | Professional | | | | | | | | | | | | | | | | K-1 | | K-1 II | | | | | | |
| DSLR | APS-C | High-end | | | | | | | | | | | | | | | K-3 II | | | | | | K-3 III | | | |
| DSLR | APS-C | High-end | | | | | | | | | | | | | K-3 | | | | | | | | | | | |
| DSLR | APS-C | Advanced | | | | | | | | | K-7 | K-5 | | K-5 II / K-5 IIs | | | | | | | | | | | | |
| DSLR | APS-C | Advanced | | *ist D | | | K10D | | K20D | | | | | | | | | KP | | | | | | | | |
| DSLR | APS-C | Midrange | | | | | K100D | 100DS | K200D | | | | | K-30 | K-50 | | | K-70 | | | | | | KF | | |
| DSLR | APS-C | Entry-level | | | *ist DS | *ist DS2 | | | | | | K-r | | | K-500 | K-S2 | | | | | | | | | | |
| DSLR | APS-C | Entry-level | | | *ist DL | DL2 | K110D | | | K-m/K2000 | K-x | | | | | K-S1 | | | | | | | | | | |
| MILC | APS-C | K-mount | | | | | | | | | | | K-01 | | | | | | | | | | | | | |
| MILC | 1/1.7" | Q-mount | | | | | | | | | | | | | Q7 | | | | | | | | | | | |
| MILC | 1/1.7" | Q-mount | | | | | | | | | | | | | | Q-S1 | | | | | | | | | | |
| MILC | 1/2.3" | Q-mount | | | | | | | | | | | Q | Q10 | | | | | | | | | | | | |
| DSLR | Prototypes | | MZ-D (2000); 645D Prototype (2006); AP 50th Anniv. (2007) | | | | | | | | | | | | | | | | | | | | | | | |
| Type | Sensor | Class | | | | | | | | | | | | | | | | | | | | | | | | |
| Type | Sensor | Class | 2003 | 2004 | 2005 | 2006 | | 2007 | 2008 | 2009 | 2010 | 2011 | 2012 | 2013 | 2014 | 2015 | 2016 | 2017 | 2018 | 2019 | 2020 | 2021 | 2022 | 2023 | 2024 | 2025 |
