= Pentax SF7 =

35mm film camera

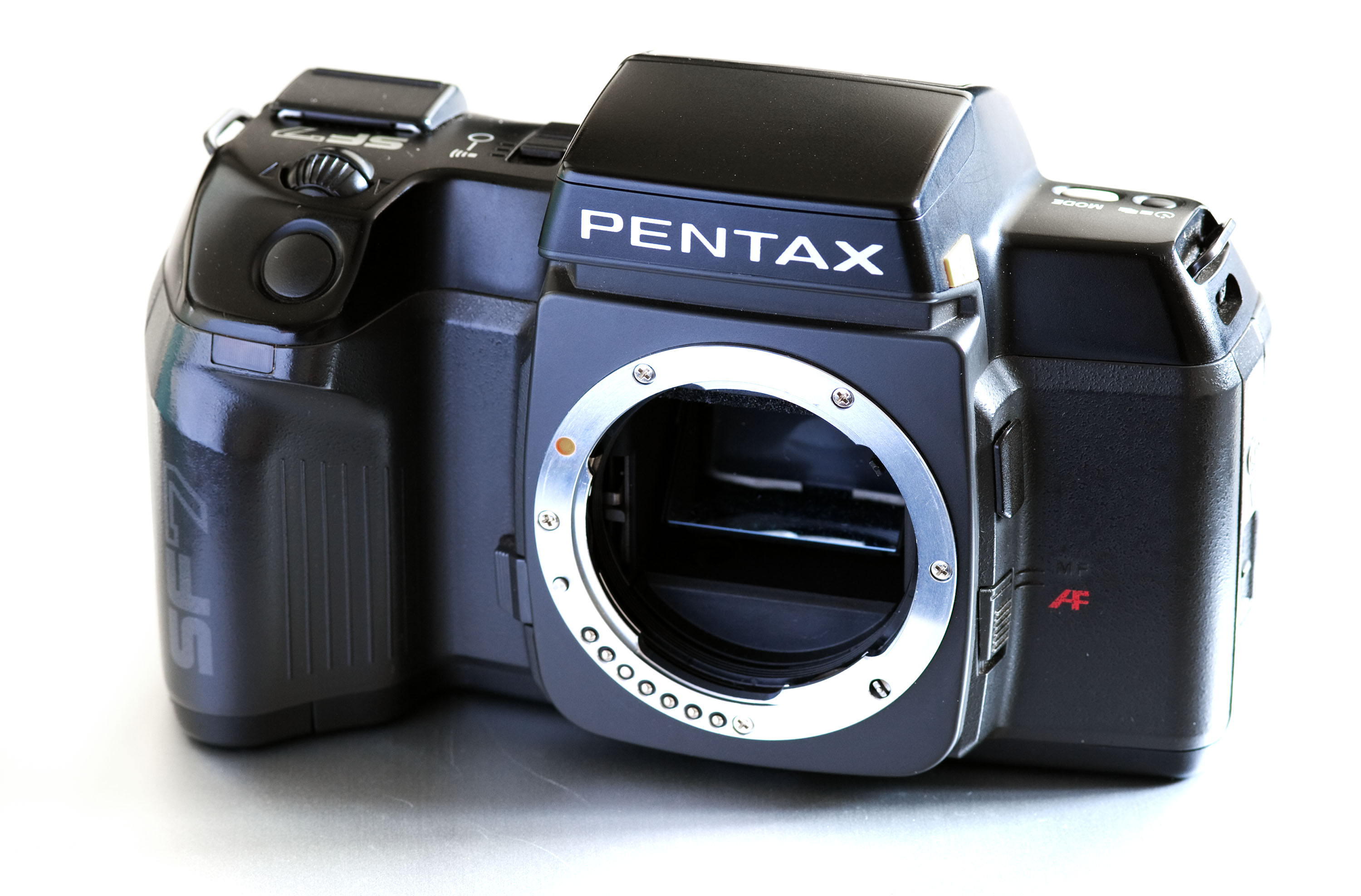
Pentax SF7

The Pentax SF7 was a camera from the Japanese Pentax brand, manufactured by the Asahi Optical Co., Ltd. (called PENTAX Corporation since 2002). It is also known as the Pentax SF10 in the United States, and was first produced in 1988. It was Pentax's third Autofocus 35mm SLR after the Pentax ME F and the very similar Pentax SFX.

== Features ==
- Two auto-focus modes: single shot (focus priority) or continuous (servo)
- Shutter speed range, from 30 seconds to 1/2000th sec and Bulb.
- Motor drive transports at 2.0 frame/s

== See also ==
- List of Pentax products

Class	1970s										1980s										1990s										2000s									
Class	0	1	2	3	4	5	6	7	8	9	0	1	2	3	4	5	6	7	8	9	0	1	2	3	4	5	6	7	8	9	0	1	2	3	4	5	6	7	8	9
Flagship																						PZ-1 (Z-1)			PZ-1p (Z-1p)							MZ-S								
Flagship																									PZ-5p (Z-5p)															
Flagship											LX																													
Flagship							MX																																	
Flagship						K2 DMD																																		
Flagship						K2																																		
Midrange																		SFX (SF-1)			SFXn (SF-1n)							MZ-3 (ZX-3)				MZ-6 (ZX-L, MZ-L)								
Midrange																	P5 (P50)									MZ-5 (ZX-5)		MZ-5n (ZX-5n)												
Midrange														Super-A (Super Program)										PZ-20p (Z-20p)						MZ-7 (ZX-7)										
Midrange														Program-A (Program Plus)										Z-50p				MZ-50 (ZX-50)			MZ-30 (ZX-30)		MZ-60 (ZX-60)							
Midrange						KX						ME F														PZ-70p (Z-70p)														
Midrange							ME			ME Super																														
Entry-level																			SF7 (SF10)								MZ-10 (ZX-10)							*ist						
Entry-level																							PZ-20 (Z-20)			PZ-70 (Z-70)														
Entry-level																						PZ-10 (Z-10)																		
Entry-level																P3 (P30)			P3n (P30n)		P3t (P30t)								MZ-M (ZX-M)											
Entry-level						KM				MV	MV 1		MG			A3 (A3000)																								
Entry-level							K1000																																	
