= Pentax *ist DL =

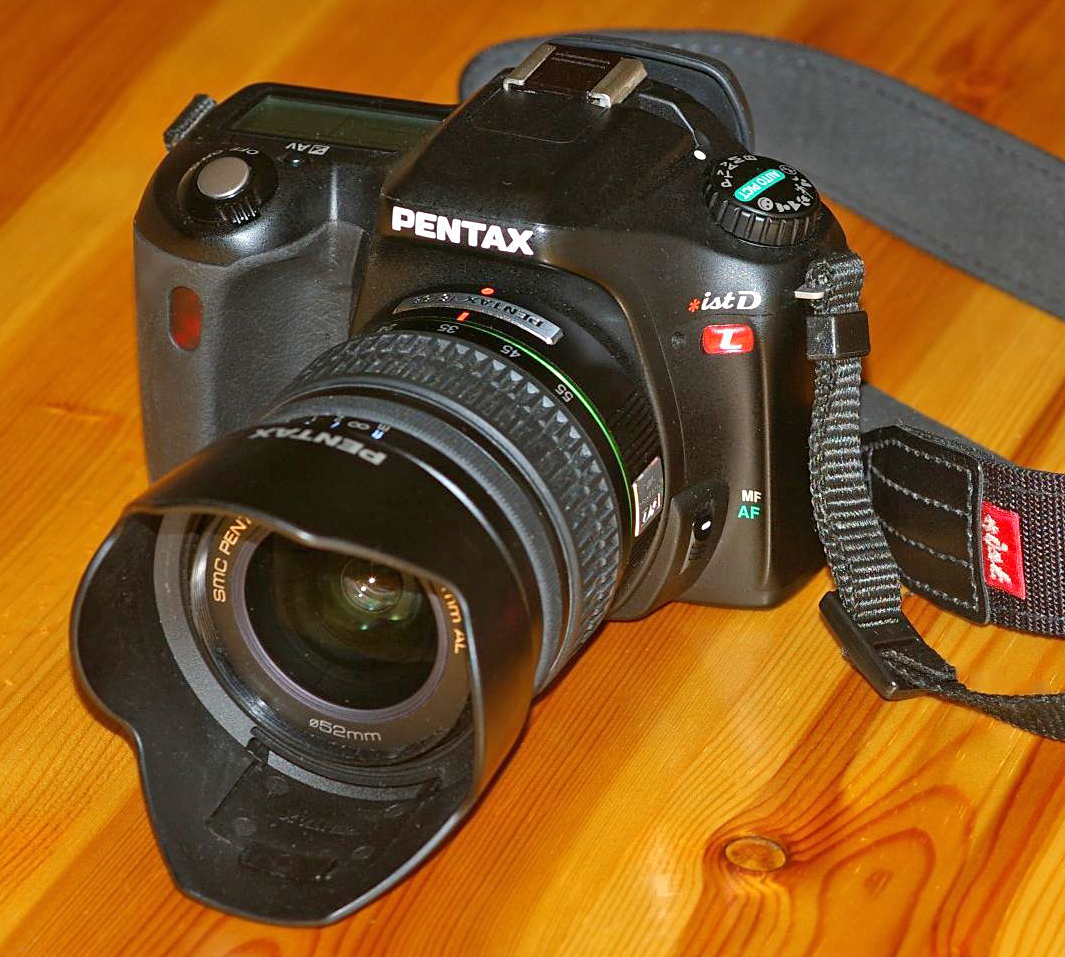

Overview
- Maker: Pentax
- Type: digital single-lens reflex camera

Lens
- Lens: Interchangeable Pentax "crippled" K_{AF2} mount compatible with Pentax auto-aperture lenses; older lenses supported in stop-down metering mode.

Sensor/medium
- Maximum resolution: 6.1 megapixels
- Film speed: ISO Auto, 200, 400, 800, 1600, 3200,
- Recording medium: SD

Exposure/metering
- Exposure modes: Program, Sensitivity Priority, Shutter-Speed Priority, Aperture Priority, Manual, Bulb
- Exposure metering: TTL open-aperture metering with choice of: 16-segment, Center-weighted Average & Spot meter

Shutter
- Shutter speed range: 1/4000 sec – 30 sec, Bulb

General
- LCD screen: 2.5", 210,000 pixels
- Battery: 4x AA or 2x CR-V3, Optional AC adapter
- Weight: 470 g (17 oz) (1 lb) without battery, 565 g with battery

The Pentax *ist DL is a 2005 entry-level digital single lens-reflex camera manufactured by Pentax.

== Pentax *ist DL2 ==
Introduced in 2006, the Pentax *ist DL2 is a minor upgrade to the original model Pentax *ist DL. It was available only in selected markets. This camera was co-developed with Samsung, which sold a rebadged version as the Samsung GX 1L, which was bundled with a Schneider Kreuznach-branded Pentax DA 18-55mm lens.

Type	Sensor	Class	2003	2004	2005	2006		2007	2008	2009	2010	2011	2012	2013	2014	2015	2016	2017	2018	2019	2020	2021	2022	2023	2024	2025
DSLR	MF	Professional										645D				645Z										
DSLR	FF	Professional																K-1		K-1 II						
DSLR	APS-C	High-end															K-3 II						K-3 III			
DSLR	APS-C	High-end													K-3											
DSLR	APS-C	Advanced									K-7	K-5		K-5 II / K-5 IIs												
DSLR	APS-C	Advanced		*ist D			K10D		K20D									KP								
DSLR	APS-C	Midrange					K100D	100DS	K200D					K-30	K-50			K-70						KF		
DSLR	APS-C	Entry-level			*ist DS	*ist DS2						K-r			K-500	K-S2										
DSLR	APS-C	Entry-level			*ist DL	DL2	K110D			K-m/K2000	K-x					K-S1										
MILC	APS-C	K-mount											K-01													
MILC	1/1.7"	Q-mount													Q7											
MILC	1/1.7"	Q-mount														Q-S1										
MILC	1/2.3"	Q-mount											Q	Q10												
DSLR	Prototypes		MZ-D (2000); 645D Prototype (2006); AP 50th Anniv. (2007)																							
Type	Sensor	Class																								
Type	Sensor	Class	2003	2004	2005	2006		2007	2008	2009	2010	2011	2012	2013	2014	2015	2016	2017	2018	2019	2020	2021	2022	2023	2024	2025
