= Pentax K10D =

Camera model by Pentax

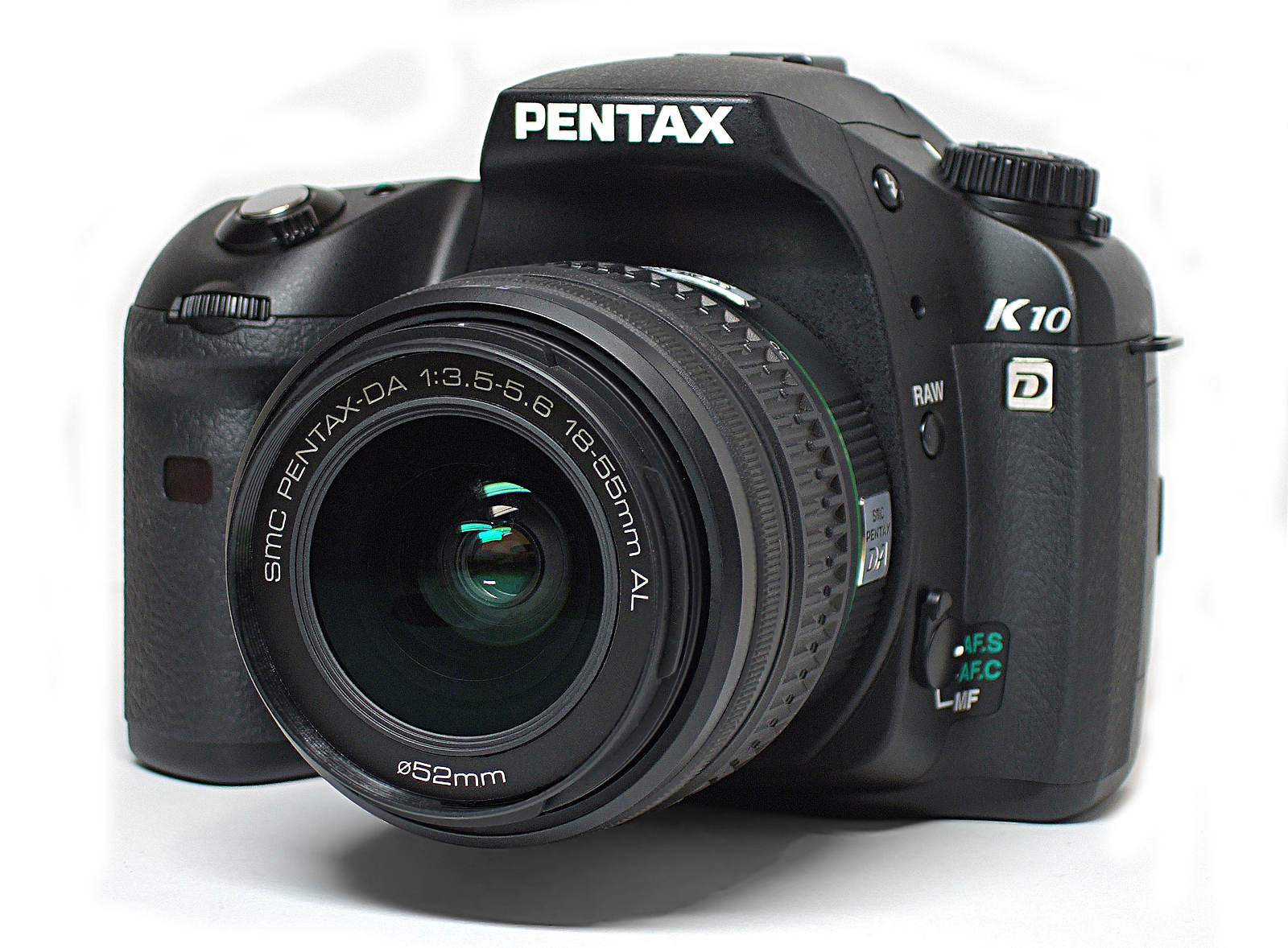

Overview
- Maker: Pentax
- Type: Digital single-lens reflex camera

Lens
- Lens: Interchangeable Pentax K_{AF2} mount compatible with Pentax auto-aperture lenses; older lenses supported in stop-down metering mode.

Sensor/medium
- Sensor: Interline/interlace CCD with a primary color filter. APS-C 23.5 x 15.7 mm
- Maximum resolution: 3,872 × 2,592 (10.2 megapixels)
- Film speed: ISO Auto, 100, 200, 400, 800, 1600,
- Recording medium: SD, SDHC

Exposure/metering
- Exposure modes: Program, Sensitivity Priority, Shutter-Speed Priority, Aperture Priority, Shutter-Speed and Aperture Priority, Manual, Bulb
- Exposure metering: TTL open-aperture metering with choice of: 16-segment, Center-weighted & Spot meter

Shutter
- Shutter speed range: 1/4000 sec–30 sec

General
- LCD screen: 2.5", 210,000 pixels
- Battery: Rechargeable D-LI50 Lithium-ion battery, Optional AC adapter
- Weight: 710 g (25 oz) without battery, 785 g with battery
- Made in: Philippines

The Pentax K10D and similar Samsung GX-10 are 10.2-megapixel digital single-lens reflex cameras launched in late 2006. They were developed in a collaboration between Pentax of Japan and Samsung of South Korea.

The K10D was announced on 13 September 2006, and released in mid-November 2006, while Samsung announced the GX-10 on 21 September 2006 and it became available on January 1, 2007. The Pentax K20D, successor to the K10D, was officially announced on January 23, 2008.

The K10D has been hailed by Popular Photography and Imaging magazine as "an all-star player," and was named as a finalist for their 2007 "Camera of the Year" award.

== Technology and construction ==
It combines a 10.2 effective megapixel CCD sensor, coupled with a 22-bit analog-to-digital converter (ADC) and a shake reduction system which also provides a dust removal feature to keep dust off the sensor surface. The K10D features a new image processor called PRIME (Pentax Real IMage Engine), which interfaces with DDR2 RAM, providing 800 MB/s bandwidth. The camera body is dust and weather-resistant featuring 72 seals throughout the camera.

Images can be saved in JPG, Pentax raw image format (PEF) or standard DNG format. The Pentax K10D was among the first digital cameras to support the DNG format natively.

== Competition and market segment ==
The K10D's feature set does not match precisely any other camera on the market. By sensor size and price it is a competitor to the Sony α 100, the Nikon D80, the Canon EOS 400D ("Digital Rebel XTi" in North America) and the Olympus E-400, all 10-megapixel DSLRs unveiled in mid- to late 2006. Of course, sensor size alone does not relate directly to any measure of quality or features, and the K10D can also be considered a competitor to higher priced cameras such as the Canon EOS 30D, and its weather sealing is only matched by the much more expensive Nikon D200, Fujifilm S5 Pro and the Canon EOS-1D Mark II N/1Ds Mark II in current production.

== Lens mount and compatible lenses ==
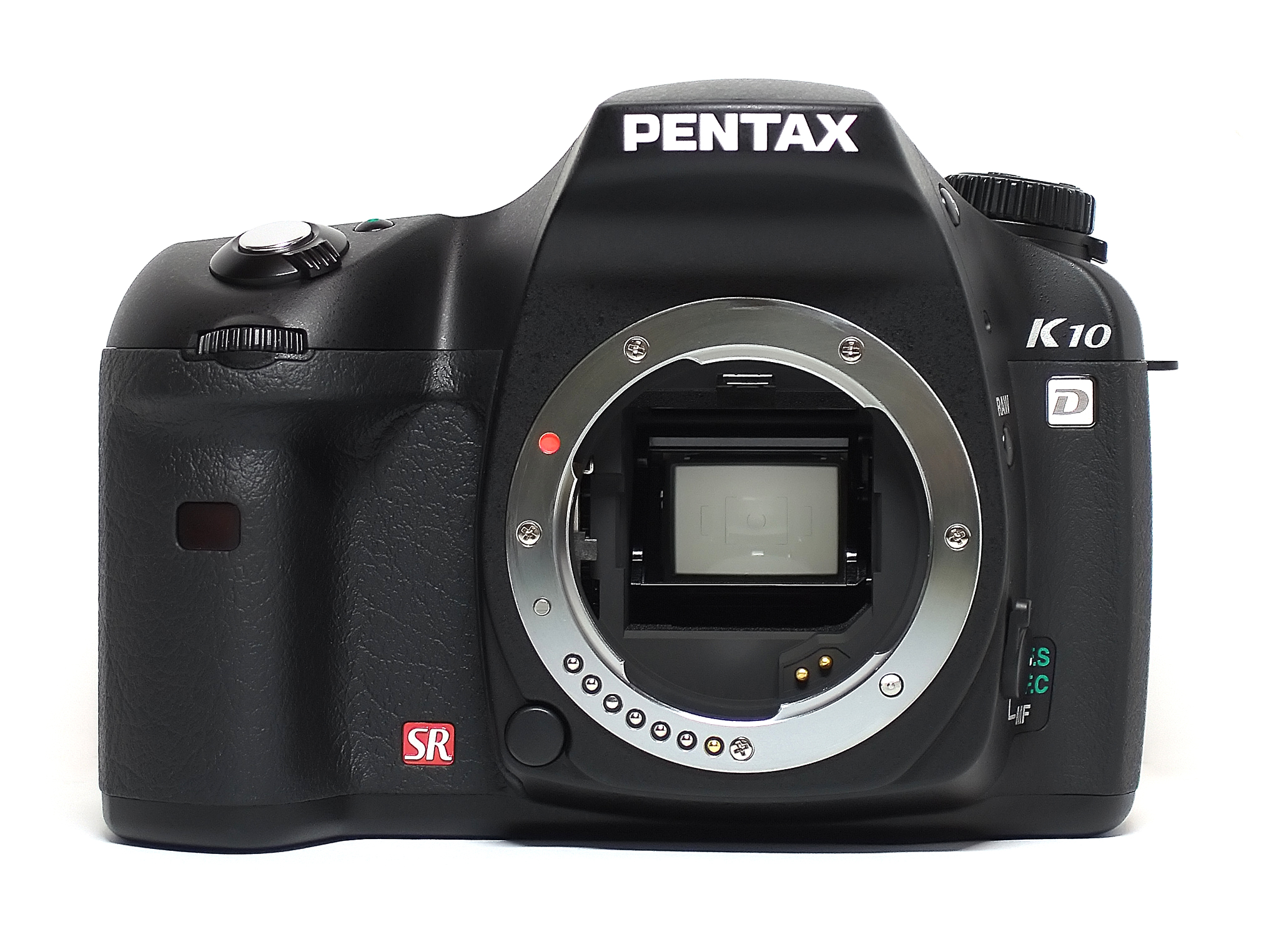
Front, showing K_{AF2} mount

The K10D camera features the "crippled" K_{AF2} mount. Like the full-featured K_{AF2} mount, this has power contacts for the lens and supports power zoom and MTF information transferred from the lens to the body, but lacks the mechanical stop-down coupler necessary for full compatibility with the oldest Pentax K-mount lenses.

The K10D is typically sold in a bundle with Pentax's SMC-DA 18-55mm kit lens, which has received very favorable reviews compared to kit lenses from Canon and Nikon, because of its build-quality and quick-shift focus system.

In addition, the K10D supports in-lens ultrasonic focusing motors, branded SDM by Pentax. Lenses thus equipped support quieter and faster autofocus operation. Two weathersealed ultrasonic lenses, developed in co-operation with Tokina, have been released.

Like the "crippled" K_{AF} mount used on previous Pentax digital SLRs, the "crippled" K_{AF2} lacks the mechanism to mechanically sense a lens's aperture ring setting. For that reason, when using the manual aperture ring on K-mount lenses, it is necessary to set the 'Use aperture ring' setting in the 'Custom Menu' to 'Permitted' and use stop-down metering mode (Pentax calls it optical preview) to ensure proper exposure. K_{A} and K_{AF} lenses with aperture rings are fully compatible when the aperture ring is set to automatic ('A'), giving control over the aperture to the camera body.

== Samsung GX-10 ==
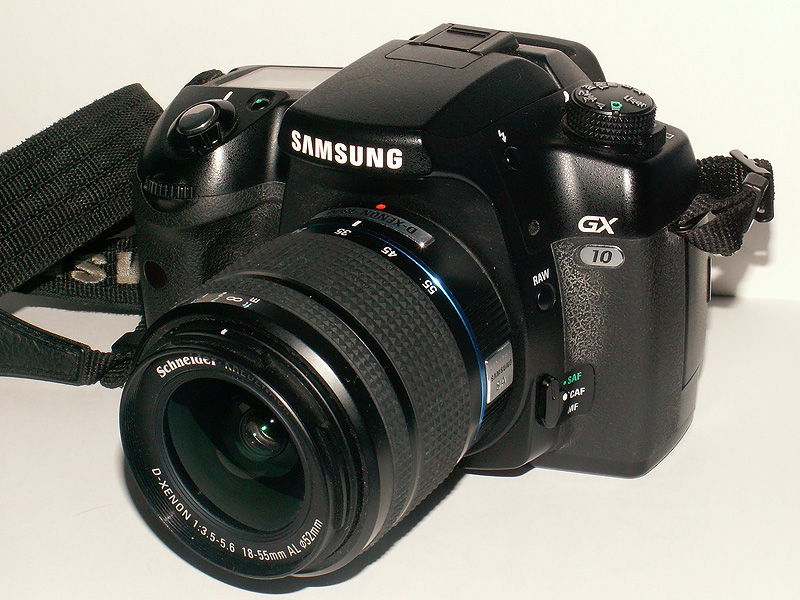
Samsung's version of the K10D: the GX-10

Under a partnership between Pentax and Samsung Techwin, the K10D is also available badged as the Samsung GX-10. The two cameras are virtually identical with a few small differences. The text labels for buttons are different, using a slightly smaller font, and the buttons themselves are slightly different. In addition, the hand grip is a slightly different shape, meaning the battery grip for the K10D is incompatible – however, a GX-10 battery grip is available. The firmware is quite different, using different menus and symbols, and providing no support for Pentax's PEF raw image format.

== Awards ==
The K10D has won a number of awards from the industry, the first being the TIPA 2007 award for the best "Expert Digital SLR". On 15 August, 2007, the K10D was announced as the winner of EISAs “European Camera of the Year 2007-2008” award.

On 17 May, Pentax announced that it had won the Japanese Camera Grand Prix 2007. Pentax later announced on 14 June, 2007, the introduction of a limited edition K10D package in commemoration of winning of the Japanese Camera Grand Prix. The package features a dark brown K10D with gold lettering and a matching battery grip. A large leather camera strap is included with the words "CAMERA GRAND PRIX 2007".

The K10D won American Photo's Editor's Choice 2007 for the Advanced Digital SLR category. (Volume 18, No. 4 July/August)

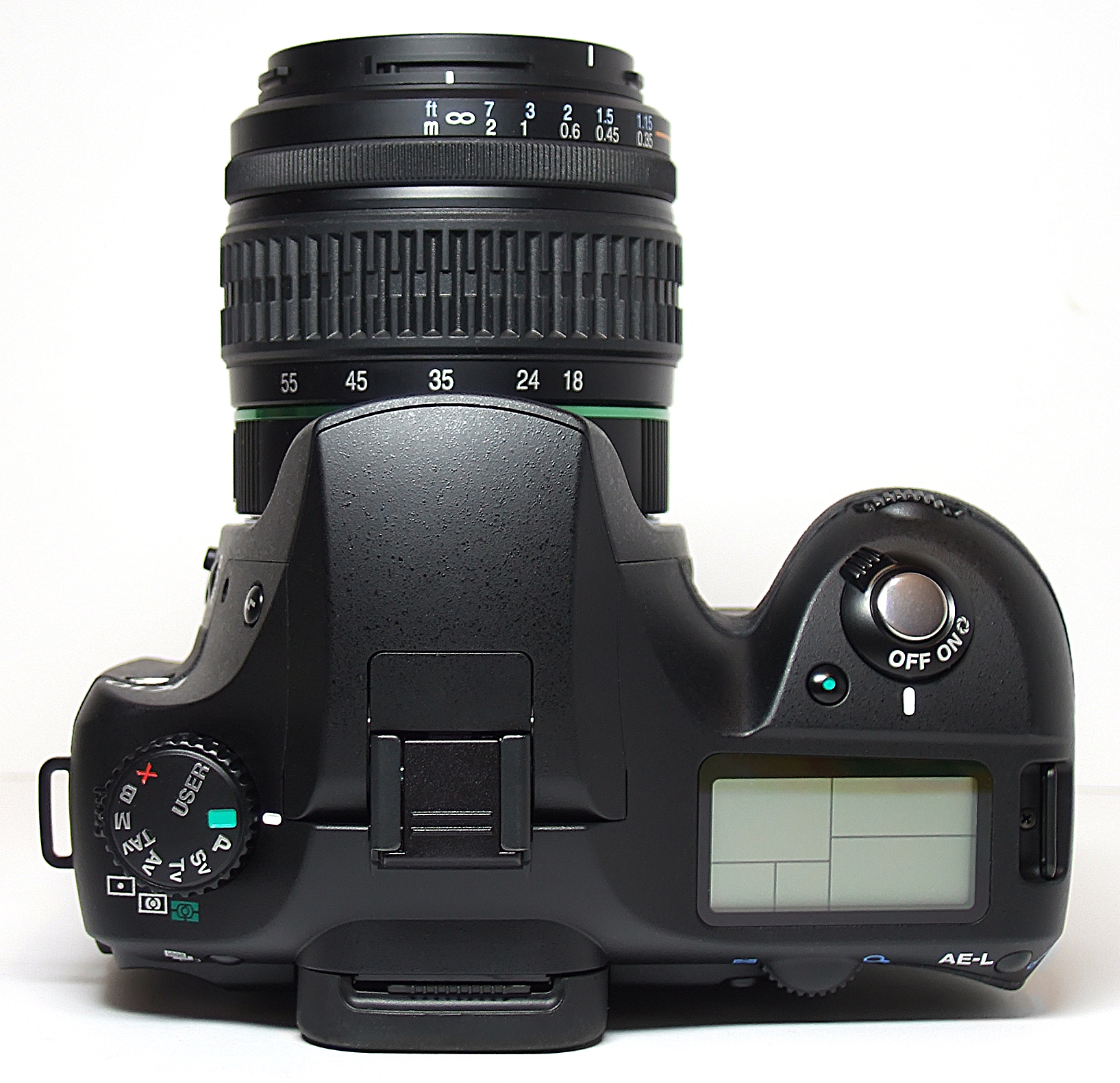
Top

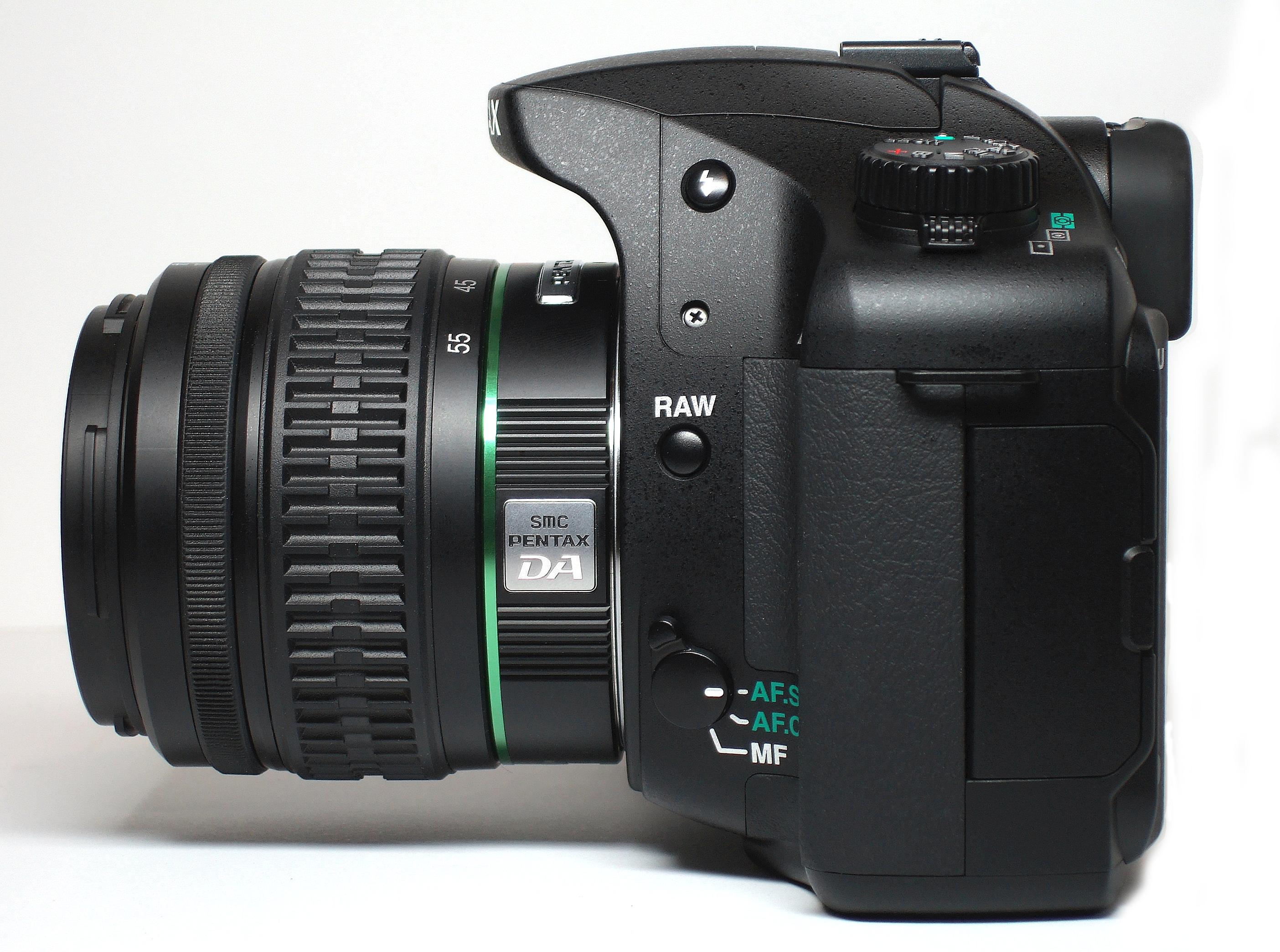
Left

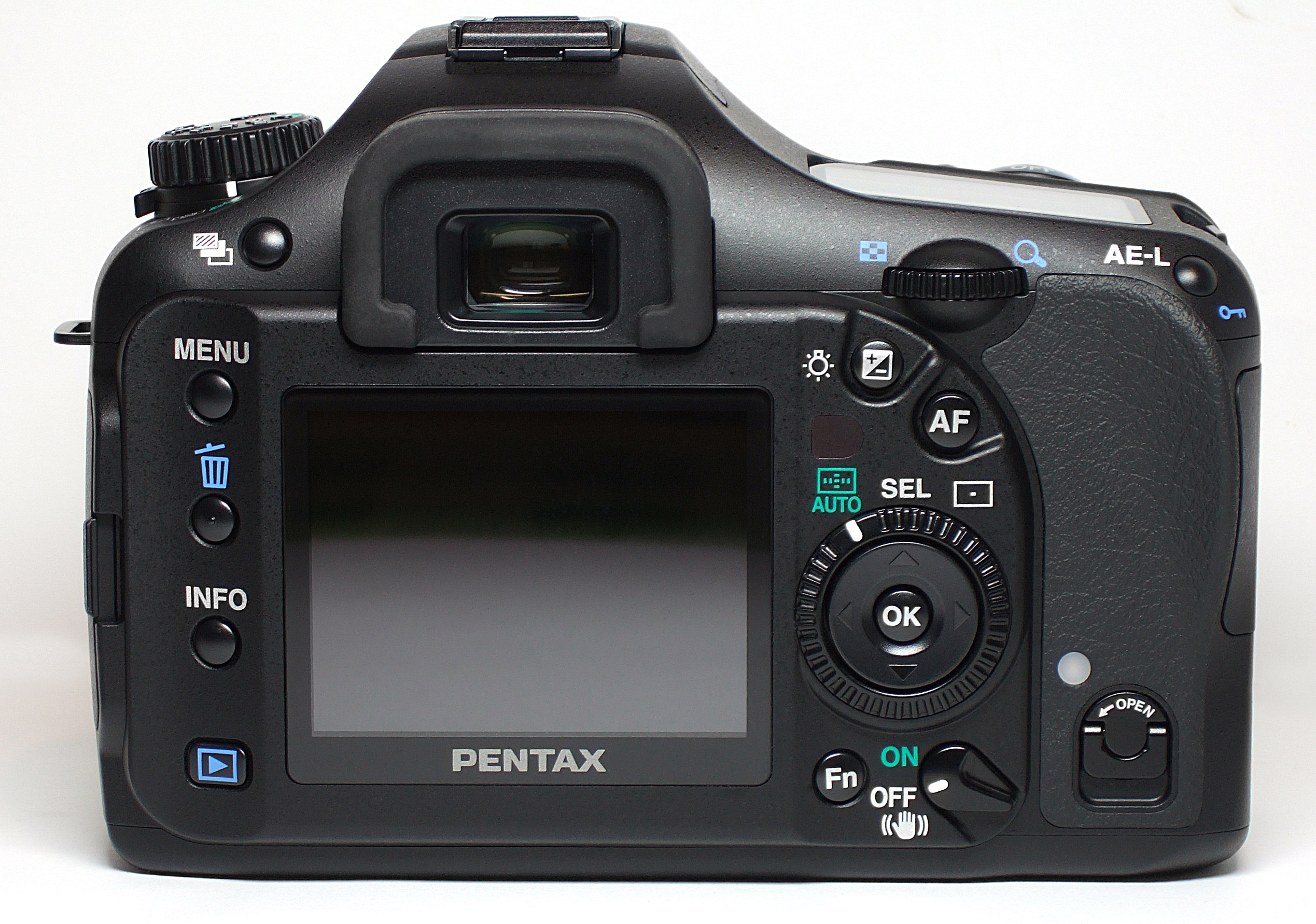
Rear

Type	Sensor	Class	2003	2004	2005	2006		2007	2008	2009	2010	2011	2012	2013	2014	2015	2016	2017	2018	2019	2020	2021	2022	2023	2024	2025
DSLR	MF	Professional										645D				645Z										
DSLR	FF	Professional																K-1		K-1 II						
DSLR	APS-C	High-end															K-3 II						K-3 III			
DSLR	APS-C	High-end													K-3											
DSLR	APS-C	Advanced									K-7	K-5		K-5 II / K-5 IIs												
DSLR	APS-C	Advanced		*ist D			K10D		K20D									KP								
DSLR	APS-C	Midrange					K100D	100DS	K200D					K-30	K-50			K-70						KF		
DSLR	APS-C	Entry-level			*ist DS	*ist DS2						K-r			K-500	K-S2										
DSLR	APS-C	Entry-level			*ist DL	DL2	K110D			K-m/K2000	K-x					K-S1										
MILC	APS-C	K-mount											K-01													
MILC	1/1.7"	Q-mount													Q7											
MILC	1/1.7"	Q-mount														Q-S1										
MILC	1/2.3"	Q-mount											Q	Q10												
DSLR	Prototypes		MZ-D (2000); 645D Prototype (2006); AP 50th Anniv. (2007)																							
Type	Sensor	Class																								
Type	Sensor	Class	2003	2004	2005	2006		2007	2008	2009	2010	2011	2012	2013	2014	2015	2016	2017	2018	2019	2020	2021	2022	2023	2024	2025
