= Pentax *ist D =

Pentax *ist D is a digital SLR camera produced by Pentax, released in 2003. The *ist D produces a 6.1 megapixel resolution image, using same sensor as Nikon D100. It was the smallest and lightest dSLR at the time, but still well equipped. For example, it had a large and bright pentaprism viewfinder, compared to pentamirror in other similarly priced competition. The name is compounded of an asterisk as a placeholder and the neologism "ist" (as in artist, journalist or tourist, referring to the camera's versatility), followed by a "D" for "digital".

== Images ==
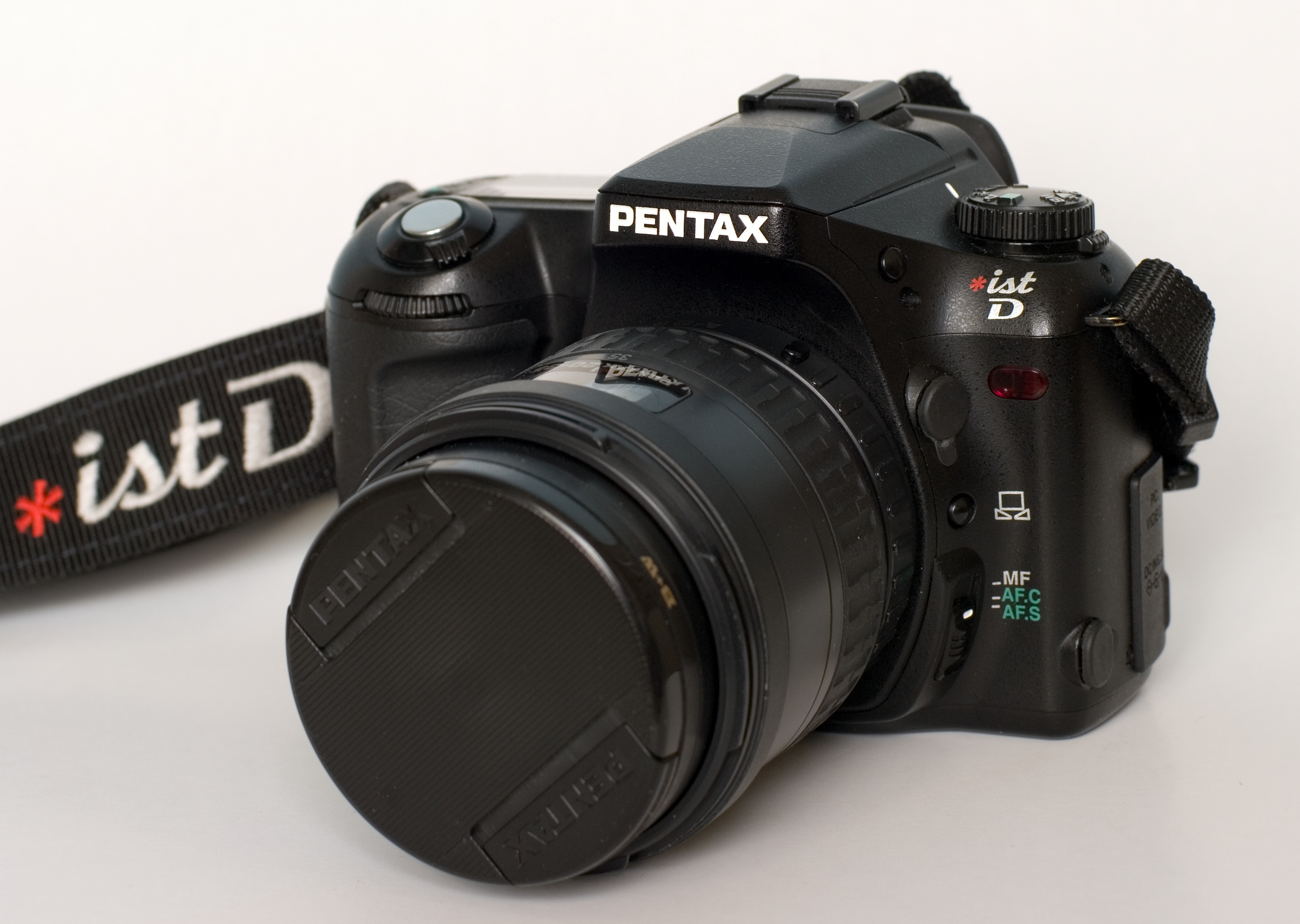
Pentax *istD w FA20-35

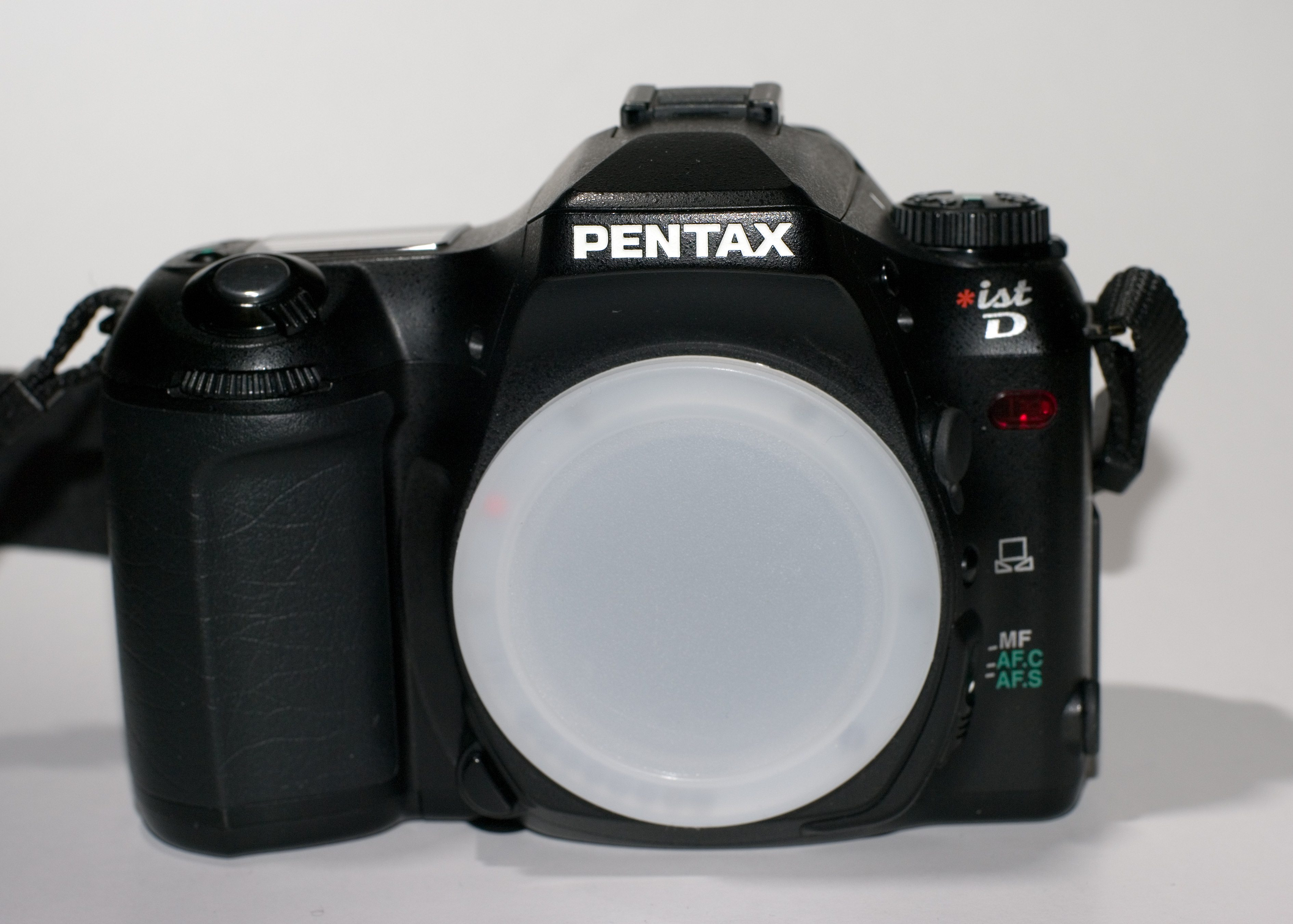
Pentax *istD DSLR photo camera body

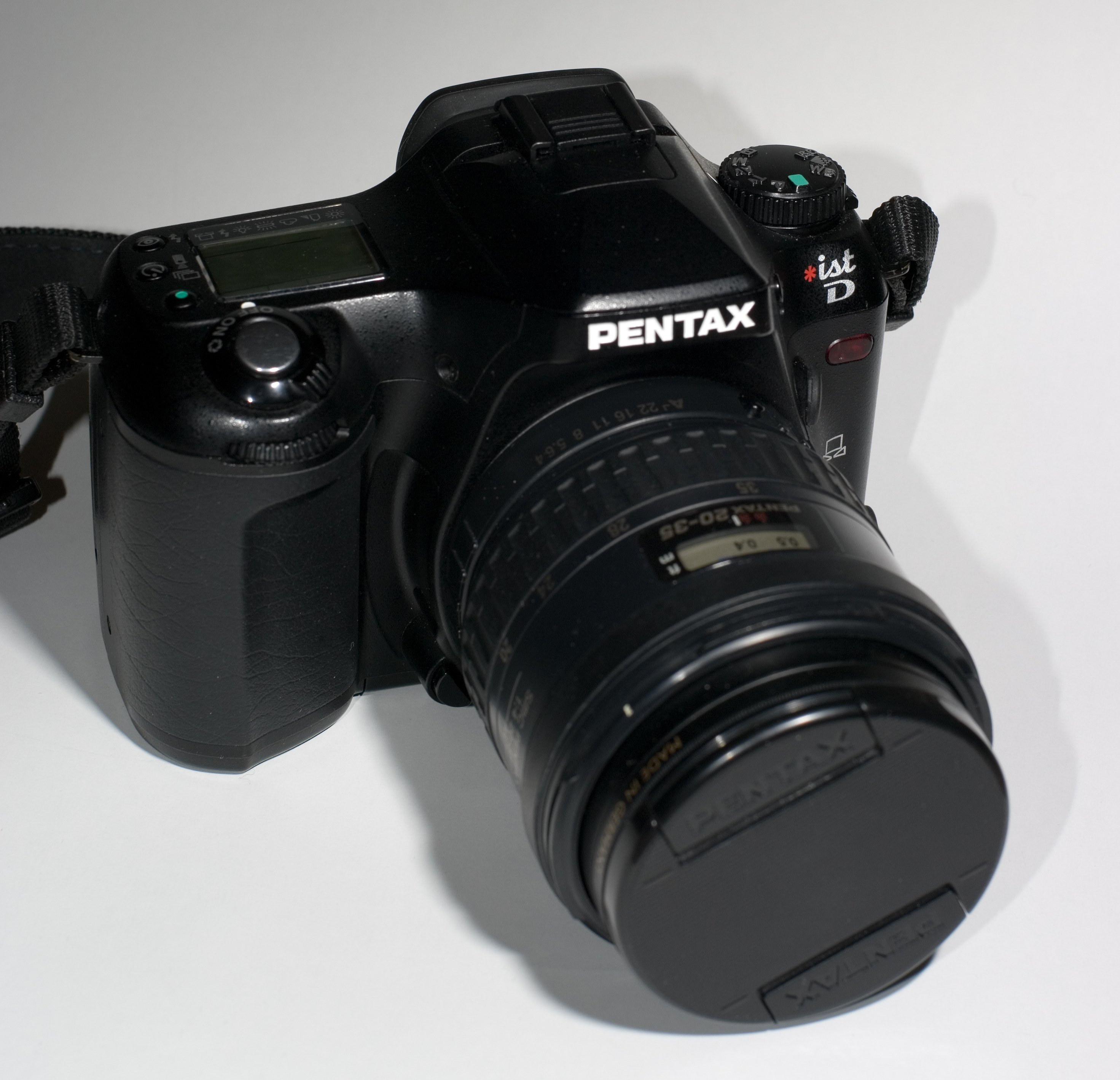
Pentax *istD DSLR photo camera body with FA 20-35/4 lens

Type	Sensor	Class	2003	2004	2005	2006		2007	2008	2009	2010	2011	2012	2013	2014	2015	2016	2017	2018	2019	2020	2021	2022	2023	2024	2025
DSLR	MF	Professional										645D				645Z										
DSLR	FF	Professional																K-1		K-1 II						
DSLR	APS-C	High-end															K-3 II						K-3 III			
DSLR	APS-C	High-end													K-3											
DSLR	APS-C	Advanced									K-7	K-5		K-5 II / K-5 IIs												
DSLR	APS-C	Advanced		*ist D			K10D		K20D									KP								
DSLR	APS-C	Midrange					K100D	100DS	K200D					K-30	K-50			K-70						KF		
DSLR	APS-C	Entry-level			*ist DS	*ist DS2						K-r			K-500	K-S2										
DSLR	APS-C	Entry-level			*ist DL	DL2	K110D			K-m/K2000	K-x					K-S1										
MILC	APS-C	K-mount											K-01													
MILC	1/1.7"	Q-mount													Q7											
MILC	1/1.7"	Q-mount														Q-S1										
MILC	1/2.3"	Q-mount											Q	Q10												
DSLR	Prototypes		MZ-D (2000); 645D Prototype (2006); AP 50th Anniv. (2007)																							
Type	Sensor	Class																								
Type	Sensor	Class	2003	2004	2005	2006		2007	2008	2009	2010	2011	2012	2013	2014	2015	2016	2017	2018	2019	2020	2021	2022	2023	2024	2025
