= Pentax =

Japanese optics company and brand owned by Ricoh

Pentax Corporation

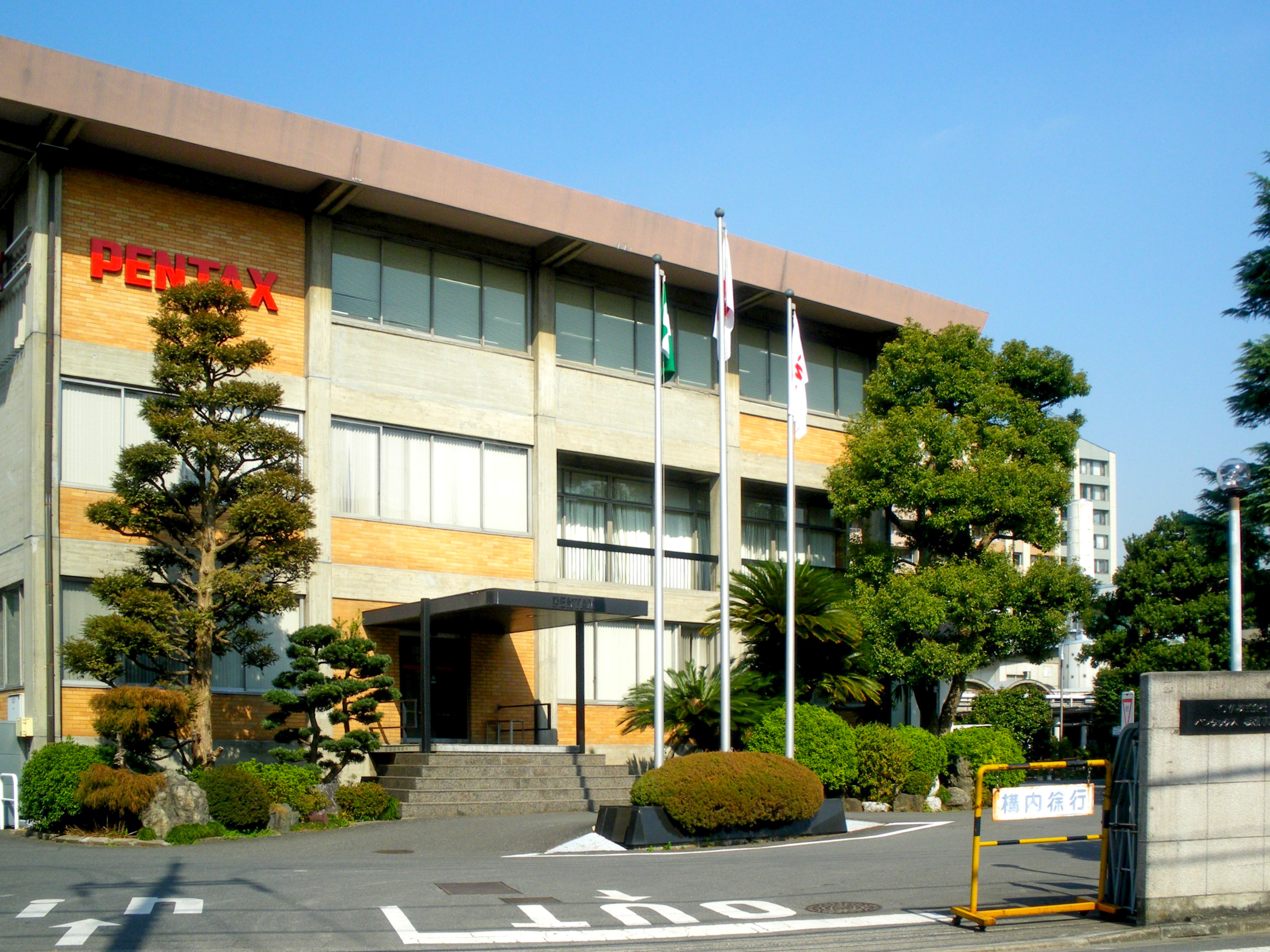
- Former headquarters in Itabashi, Tokyo
- Native name: ペンタックス株式会社
- Romanized name: Pentakkusu Kabushiki gaisha
- Formerly: Asahi Kagaku Kogyo Gōshi gaisha (1919–1938); Asahi Optical Co., Ltd. Kabushiki gaisha (1938–2002)
- Type: Public TYO: 7750 (1970–2007); Subsidiary of Hoya Corporation (2007–2008)
- Industry: Imaging
- Founded: November 1919; 106 years ago Tokyo, Japan
- Fate: Merged into Hoya; digital camera business spun off to Ricoh
- Successor: Pentax Life Care Business Division (now Pentax Medical) of Hoya (medical endoscope business); Ricoh Imaging Company (digital camera business); TI Asahi Co, Ltd. (surveying business)
- Headquarters: Maenochō, Itabashi, Tokyo, Japan
- Area served: Worldwide
- Products: Cameras and photographic equipment; binoculars, spotting scopes and telescopes; medical fiberscopes and endoscopes; medical fine ceramics products; information and communications products; components; industrial products; eyeglass lenses
- Revenue: ▲JP¥157.3 billion (Business year ending March 31, 2007)
- Net income: ▲JP¥3.57 billion
- Number of employees: 1,661 (as of March 31, 2005; non-consolidated Pentax Corp. only)
- Website: Pentax

Pentax Corporation (ペンタックス株式会社, Pentakkusu Kabushiki gaisha) was a Japanese camera and optical equipment manufacturer. Currently, it exists as Pentax Medical, a division of Hoya's medical endoscope business, as well as the digital and film camera brand of Ricoh Imaging Company, a subsidiary of Ricoh, and TI Asahi Co, Ltd., a manufacturer of surveying equipment.

Pentax, founded in 1919 as Asahi Kogaku Goshi Kaisha, a town workshop specializing in polishing eyeglass lenses, developed Japan's first single-lens reflex camera, the Asahiflex, in 1952. In 1938, it changed its name to Asahi Optical Co., Ltd.. In the mid-1950s, Asahi Optical Co., Ltd. acquired the German brand Pentax, and Asahi Pentax Corporation was established in Japan as a sales company. In 2002, Asahi Optical Co. changed its name to Pentax Corporation. By 2006, Pentax's domestic market share in digital cameras had declined to 4%. In 2007, Pentax was acquired by Hoya and subsequently merged with the company the following year. In 2011, Hoya spun off the Pentax brand's digital camera business, which was then acquired by Ricoh, leading to the establishment of Pentax Ricoh Imaging (now Ricoh Imaging).

As a response to growing interest in film photography, Ricoh Imaging launched the Pentax 17 on June 17, 2024. The Pentax 17 is a half-frame film camera. This launch marks the first Pentax film camera in over two decades.

== Corporate history ==
=== Early history ===
The original company was founded as Asahi Optical Co Asahi Kogaku Goshi Kaisha in November 1919 by Kumao Kajiwara, at a shop in the Toshima suburb of Tokyo, and began producing spectacle lenses (which it still manufactures). Asahi means in Japanese "Rising Sun" and was chosen as a symbol of hope. Kogaku means "optical" or "optics", while Goshi Kaisha is a Japanese term for a "limited partnership company," which was its original legal structure.

In 1938, it changed its name to Asahi Optical Co., Ltd. (旭光学工業株式会社, Asahi Kōgaku Kōgyō Kabushiki-gaisha); by this time, it was also manufacturing camera/cine lenses. In the lead-up to World War II, Asahi Optical devoted much of its time to fulfilling military contracts for optical instruments. At the end of the war, Asahi Optical was disbanded by the occupying powers, being allowed to re-form in 1948. The company resumed its pre-war activities, manufacturing binoculars and consumer camera lenses for Konishiroku and Chiyoda Kōgaku Seikō (later Konica and Minolta respectively).

=== Early 1950s to 2007 ===
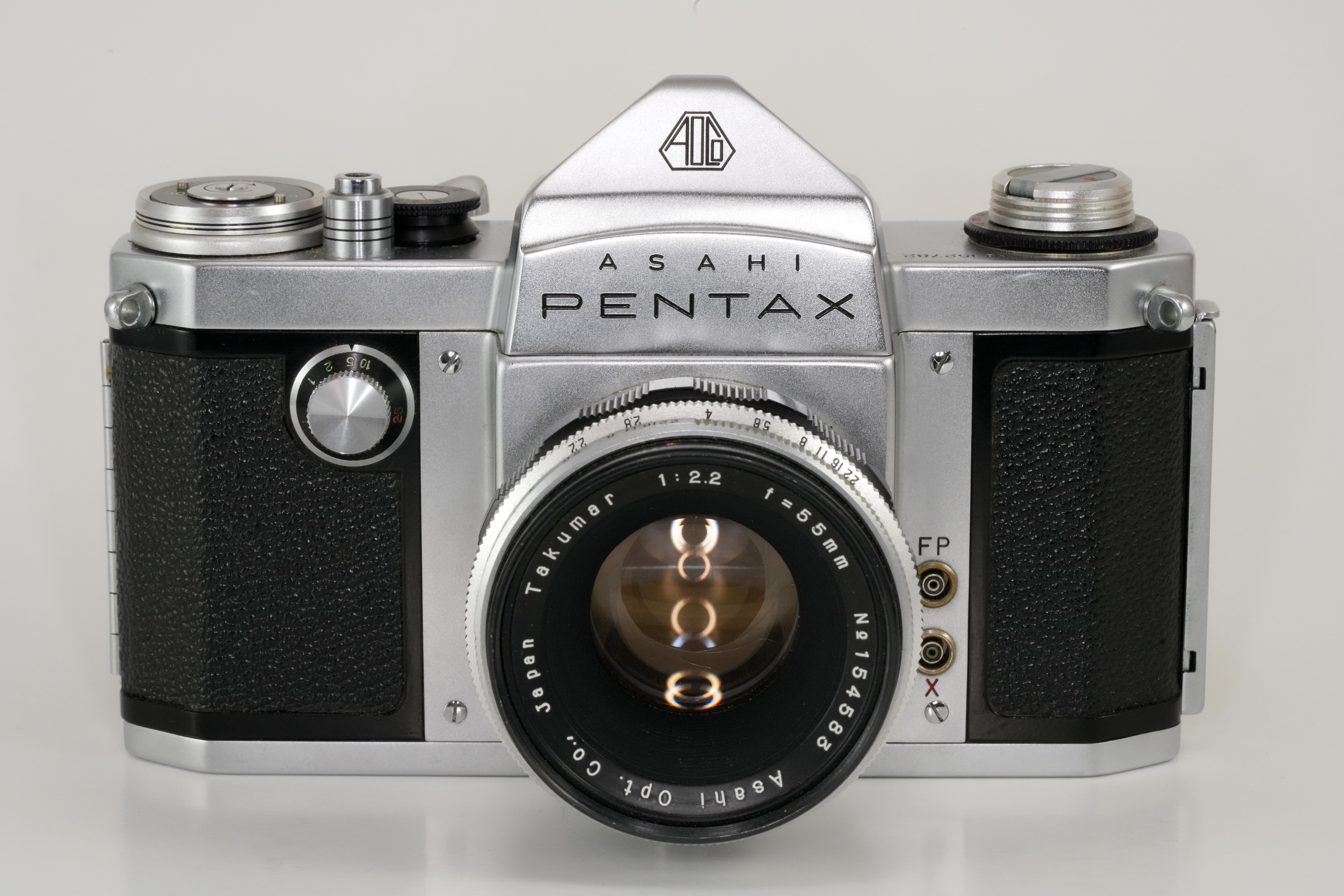
1957, Asahi Pentax

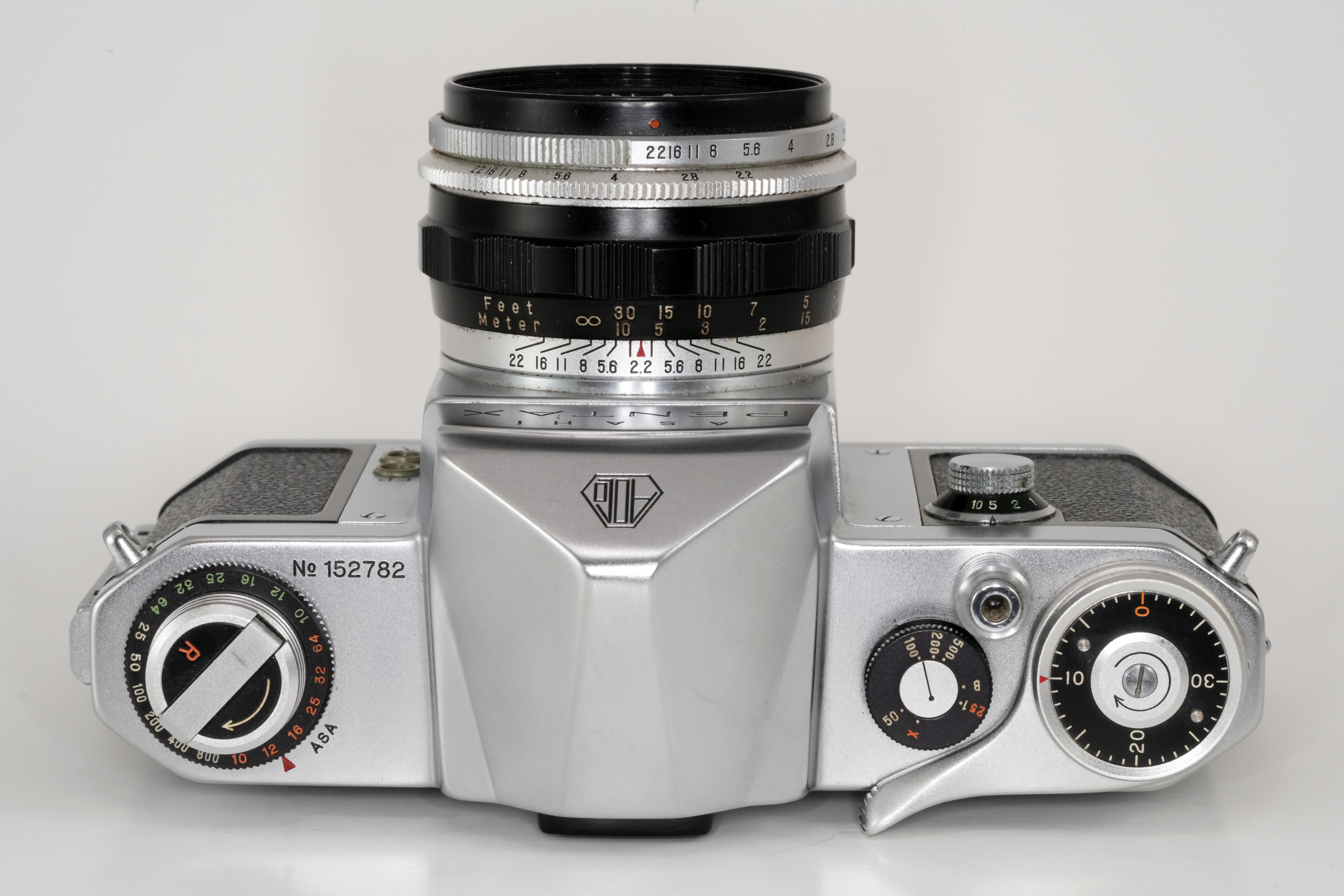
1957, Asahi Pentax, top view

The period around 1950 marked the return of the Japanese photographic industry to the vigorous level of the late 1930s, and its emergence as a major exporter. The newly reborn industry had sold many of its cameras to the occupation forces (having had far more disposable income than the Japanese), which were well received. The Korean War saw a huge influx of journalists and photographers to the Far East, where they were impressed by lenses from companies such as Nikon and Canon for their Leica rangefinder cameras, and also by bodies by these and other companies to supplement and replace the Leica and Contax cameras they were using.

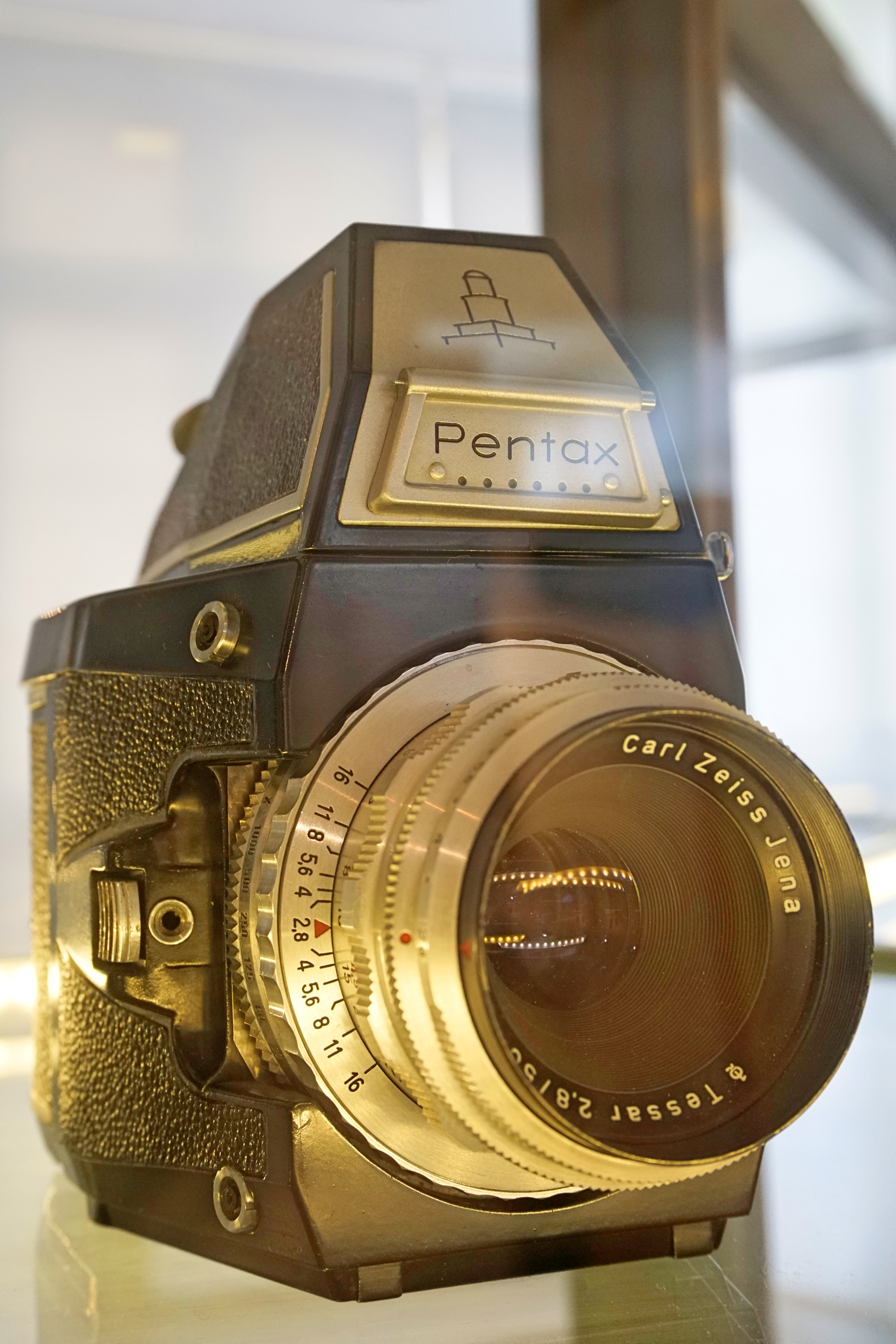
Zeiss Ikon Pentax prototype with a Carl Zeiss Jena Tessar lens

In 1952, Asahi Optical introduced its first camera, the Asahiflex (the first Japanese SLR using 35mm film). The name "Pentax" was originally a registered trademark of the East German VEB Zeiss Ikon (from "Pentaprism" and "Contax") and acquired by the Asahi Optical company in 1957. Since then the company has been primarily known for its photographic products, distributed 35mm equipment under the name "Asahi Pentax" and medium format 120 6x7cm equipment under the sub brand "Pentax 6x7" (from 1969 to 1990) and "Pentax 67" (from 1990 to 1999). Equipment was exported to the United States from the 1950s until the mid-1970s; being imported by Honeywell Corporation and branded as "Heiland Pentax" and later "Honeywell Pentax". The company was renamed Pentax Corporation in 2002. It was one of the world's largest optical companies, producing still cameras, binoculars, spectacle lenses, and a variety of other optical instruments. In 2004, Pentax had about 6000 employees.

=== Merger with Hoya ===
In December 2006, Pentax started the process of merging with Hoya Corporation to form Hoya Pentax HD Corporation. Hoya's primary goal was to strengthen its medical-related business by taking advantage of Pentax's technologies and expertise in the field of endoscopes, intraocular lenses, surgical loupes, biocompatible ceramics, etc. It was speculated that Pentax's camera business could be sold off after the merger. A stock swap was to be completed by October 1, 2007, but the process was called off on April 11, 2007. Pentax president Fumio Urano resigned over the matter, with Takashi Watanuki taking over as president of Pentax. However, despite Watanuki's previously stated opposition to a Hoya merger, on May 16 it was reported that Pentax had accepted "with conditions" a sweetened offer from Hoya, according to a source familiar with the matter. Pentax was under increasing pressure from its major shareholders, Sparx Asset Management in particular, to accept Hoya's bid.

On August 6, 2007, Hoya completed a friendly public tender offer for Pentax and acquired 90.59% of the company. On August 14, 2007, the company became a consolidated subsidiary of Hoya. On October 29, 2007, Hoya and Pentax announced that Pentax would merge with and into Hoya effective on March 31, 2008. Hoya closed the Pentax-owned factory in Tokyo, and moved all manufacturing facilities to Cebu, Philippines and Hanoi, Vietnam.

=== Ricoh Imaging Company ===
On July 1, 2011, Hoya stated that it would sell its Pentax camera business to copier and printer maker Ricoh, in a deal the Nikkei business daily reported was worth about 10 billion yen ($124.2 million). On July 29, 2011, Hoya transferred its Pentax imaging systems business to a newly established subsidiary called Pentax Imaging Corporation. On October 1, 2011, Ricoh acquired all shares of Pentax Imaging Corp. and renamed the new subsidiary Pentax Ricoh Imaging Company, Ltd. Hoya continues to use the Pentax brand name for its medical related products such as endoscopes. On August 1, 2013, the company name was changed to Ricoh Imaging Company Ltd.

== Products ==
Asahi Optical Co Ltd is best known for Asahi Pentax 6x7 medium format film cameras and the later Pentax Corporation is best known for Pentax 67 medium format film cameras.

In 1990, the Asahi Optical Co. Ltd renamed the sub-brand from Pentax 6x7 to Pentax 67. The company produced Pentax 67 cameras until 1999 and ceased trading in 2002.

The success of the Pentax series was such that the business eventually renamed itself Pentax Corporation after the 35mm product line. Although the corporation ultimately merged into Hoya Corporation, it eventually was purchased by Ricoh, which continues to develop and market digital cameras under the Pentax brand. Currently, Pentax DSLRs are manufactured in Cebu, Philippines, while digital Pentax lenses are manufactured in Hanoi, Vietnam, under Pentax Ricoh Imaging Products.

On June 17 2024 Pentax launched the Pentax 17, a half-frame camera with a fixed zone focusing lens, a magnesium alloy body and a price tag of $500. The Pentax 17 is the first Pentax-branded film camera in over two decades.

== Corporate cooperation and competition ==
In 2005, Pentax Corporation partnered with Samsung to share work on camera technology and recapture market ground from Nikon and Canon. Pentax and Samsung subsequently released new DSLR siblings from this agreement. The Pentax *ist DS and *istDL2 also appeared as the Samsung GX-1S and GX-1L, while the jointly developed (90% Pentax and 10% Samsung) Pentax K10D and K20D gave birth to the Samsung GX-10 and GX-20 respectively. Some Pentax lenses are also rebranded and sold as Samsung Schneider Kreuznach D-Xenon and D-Xenogon lenses for Samsung DSLRs. However, both brands are completely compatible with Pentax and Samsung DSLRs. In 2017, Samsung announced its departure of the camera market.

Hoya is focusing its main business on the following areas: information technology, eye care, life care, optics, imaging systems. Pentax’s main competitors include Canon, Nikon, Olympus, Panasonic, Sony (imaging/camera business), Fujifilm, Sangi, Kyocera (life care business).

== Europe and Asia ==
Asahi Pentax (all 35mm equipment) Pentax 6x7 (medium format 120 6x7cm equipment from 1969 to 1990) Pentax 67 (medium format 120 6x7cm equipment from 1990 to 1999)

== North America ==
Honeywell Pentax (medium format 120 6x7cm equipment from 1969 to 1990)

== Subsidiaries ==
=== Asia ===
- Pentax Industrial Instruments Co., Ltd.
- Pentax Optotech Co., Ltd.
- Pentax Service, Co., Ltd.
- Pentax Fukushima Co., Ltd.
- Pentax Tohoku Co., Ltd.
- Pentax Trading (Shanghai) Co., Ltd.
- Pentax (Shanghai) Corporation
- Pentax Hong Kong Ltd.
- Pentax Cebu Philippines Corporation
- Pentax VN Co., Ltd.

=== Europe ===
- Pentax Europe GmbH
- Pentax U.K. Ltd.
- Pentax France S.A.
- Pentax Schweiz AG
- Pentax Scandinavia AB
- Pentax Nederland B.V.
- Pentax Europe n.v.

=== North America ===
- Pentax of America Inc. (Pentax Medical Company)
- Pentax of America Inc. (Pentax Imaging Company)
- Pentax of America Inc.
- Pentax Medical Company
- Pentax Imaging Company
- Microline Pentax Inc.
- Pentax Canada Inc.
- KayPentax (Pentax Medical Company)
- Pentax Teknologies.

== See also ==
- Asahi Pentax
- Asahiflex
- List of digital camera brands
- List of Pentax products
- List of photographic equipment makers
- Pentax cameras
- Pentax lenses
