= QFS (disambiguation) =

QFS (Quick File System) is an open source filesystem from Oracle.

QFS may also refer to:

- Quantcast File System, an open-source distributed file system software package for large-scale MapReduce/batch-processing workloads
- Quick-Shift Focus System on the Pentax D FA* 70-200mm lens

== See also ==
- QF (disambiguation)
