= Pentax D FA* 85mm lens =

HD Pentax-D FA* 85mm f/1.4 SDM AW
- Maker: Ricoh Imaging
- Lens mount: Pentax K_{AF4} (Note: Lenses with the K_{AF4} mount use electromagnetic diaphragms, omitting the mechanical aperture lever found on most Pentax lenses. Pentax DSLRs released before 2013, as well as the K-500, have not been updated to support K_{AF4} lenses and will always shoot with the aperture wide-open because they cannot control the diaphragm.)

Technical data
- Type: prime
- Focus drive: Ring-type ultrasonic motor
- Focal length: 85mm
- Crop factor: 1.0
- Aperture (max/min): f/1.4 - f/16
- Close focus distance: 0.85 metres (2.8 ft)
- Max. magnification: 0.12×
- Diaphragm blades: 9, rounded from f/1.4 - 2.8
- Construction: 12 elements in 10 groups

Features
- Manual focus override: Yes Yes
- Weather-sealing: Yes Yes
- Macro capable: No No
- Application: portrait

Physical
- Max. length: 123.5 millimetres (4.86 in)
- Diameter: 95 millimetres (3.7 in)
- Weight: 1,255 grams (44.3 oz) without hood 1,355 grams (47.8 oz) with hood
- Filter diameter: 82mm

Accessories
- Lens hood: PH-RGB82
- Case: S130-160

Angle of view
- Diagonal: 28.5° (full frame); 19° (APS-C)

History
- Introduction: June 2020

Retail info
- MSRP: 1,199.95 USD (as of 2020)

The HD Pentax-D FA* 85mm f/1.4 SDM AW lens is a professional short telephoto prime lens for the Pentax K-mount. The lens was officially announced on February 26, 2019, launched on June 25, 2020 and announced to be first shipped on June 26, 2020.

Notable features include the company's second in-house ring-type ultrasonic motor with 1.3x the torque of the Pentax D FA* 50mm lens for fast autofocus, full dust and water resistance with eight sealings and an advanced optical formula for high-resolution images with smooth bokeh.

== Notes ==
Kind	Type	Focal length	Aperture	87	88	89	1990	91	92	93	94	95	96	97	98	99	2000	01	02	03	04	05	06	07	08	09	2010	11	12	13	14	15	16	17	18	19	2020	21	22	23	24	25
Prime	UWA	14	2.8																		DA 14mm f/2.8 ED AL																					
Prime	UWA	15	4.0																							DA 15mm f/4 Limited				HD DA 15mm f/4 ED AL Limited												
Prime	UWA	20	2.8									FA 20mm f/2.8 AL																														
Prime	UWA	21	2.4																																			HD D FA 21mm Limited DC				
Prime	UWA	21	3.2																				DA 21mm f/3.2 AL Limited								HD DA 21mm f/3.2 AL Limited											
Prime	WA	24	2.0					FA* 24mm f/2 AL																																		
Prime	WA	31	1.8															FA 31mm f/1.8 Limited																				HD FA 31mm 1.8 Limited				
Prime	WA	35	2.0													FA 35mm f/2 AL																				HD FA 35mm f/2 WR						
Prime	WA	35	2.4																								DA 35mm f/2.4 AL															
Prime	WA	35	2.8																							DA 35mm f/2.8 Limited Macro					HD DA 35mm f/2.8 Limited Macro											
Prime	normal	40	2.8																		DA 40mm f/2.8 Limited									HD DA 40mm f/2.8 Limited												
Prime	normal	40	2.8																										DA 40mm f/2.8 XS													
Prime	normal	43	1.9											FA 43mm f/1.9 Limited																								HD FA 43mm 1.9 Limited				
Prime	normal	50	1.4	F 50mm f/1.4				FA 50mm f/1.4																																Classic		
Prime	normal	50	1.4																																					HD FA		
Prime	normal	50	1.4																																HD FA* 50 f/1.4 SDM AW							
Prime	normal	50	1.8																										DA 50mm f/1.8 AL													
Prime	normal	50	2.8		F 50 Macro		FA 50mm f/2.8 Macro															D FA 50mm f/2.8 Macro																				
Prime	normal	55	1.4																						DA* 55mm f/1.4 SDM																	
Prime	Short Tele	70	2.4																				DA 70mm f/2.4 Limited								HD DA 70mm f/2.4 Limited											
Prime	Short Tele	77	1.8													FA 77mm f/1.8 Limited																						HD FA 77mm 1.8 Limited				
Prime	Short Tele	85	1.4						FA* 85mm f/1.4																													HD D FA* 85mm 1.4 SDM AW				
Prime	Tele	100	2.8	F 100mm f/2.8 Macro				FA 100mm f/2.8 Macro													D FA 100mm f/2.8 Macro					D FA 2.8 Macro Macro WR														HD D FA AW		
Prime	Tele	135	2.8	F 135mm 2.8					FA 135mm 2.8																																	
Prime	Tele	200	2.8							FA* 200mm f/2.8 ED															DA* 200mm f/2.8 SDM																	
Prime	4.0	200														FA* 200mm f/4 Macro ED																										
Prime	Super tele	300	2.8								FA* 300mm f/2.8 ED																															
Prime	Super tele	300	4.x	F* 300mm f/4.5 ED				FA* 300mm f/4.5 ED																	DA* 300mm f/4 SDM																	
Prime	Super tele	400	5.6											FA* 400mm f/5.6 ED																												
Prime	Ultra tele	560	5.6																										HD DA 560mm f/5.6 ED AW													
Prime	Ultra tele	600	4.0		F* 600mm f/4 ED			FA* 600mm f/4 ED																																		
Zoom	Fisheye		3.5-4.5									F 17-28mm f/3.5-4.5 Fish-Eye														DA 10-17mm f/3.5-4.5 Fish-Eye											HD DA 10-17mm 3.5-4.5 Fish-Eye					
Zoom	UWA	11-18	2.8																																	HD DA* 11-18 f/2.8 ED DC AW						
Zoom	UWA	12-24	4.0																			DA 12-24mm f/4 ED AL																				
Zoom	UWA	15-30	2.8																														D FA 15-30mm f/2.8 ED SDM WR									
Zoom	UWA	20-35	4.0												FA 20-40mm f/4 AL																											
Zoom	WA	16-45	4.0																	DA 16-45mm 4 ED AL																						
Zoom	WA	16-50	2.8																					DA* 16-50mm f/2.8 ED AL SDM														HD DA* 2.8 ED PLM AW				
Zoom	WA	16-85	3.5-5.6																												HD DA 16-85mm f/3.5-5.6 ED DC WR											
Zoom	WA	18-50	4-5.6																													HD DA 18-50 f/4-5.6 DC WR RE										
Zoom	WA	18-135	3.5-5.6																								DA 18-135mm f/3.5-5.6 ED AL DC WR															
Zoom	WA	20-40	2.8-4																												HD DA 20-40mm f/2.8-4 Limited DC WR											
Zoom	WA	24-50	4.0	F 24-50mm f/4																																						
Zoom	WA	24/28-70	2.8								FA* 28-70mm f/2.8 AL																						D FA 24-70mm f/2.8									
Zoom	Univ.	28-80	3.5-4.7					FA 28-80 f/3.5-4.7																																		
Zoom	Univ.	28-105	3.5/4-5.6						FA 28-105 f/4-5.6																									D FA 28-105 f/3.5-5.6 ED DC WR								
Zoom	Tele	50-135	2.8																					DA* 50-135mm f/2.8 ED SDM																		
Zoom	Tele	50-200	4-5.6																			DA 50-200mm f/4-5.6 ED				DA 50-200mm f/4-5.8 ED WR																
Zoom	Tele	55-300	4-5.8																						DA 55-300mm f/4-5.8 ED					DA 55-300mm f/4-5.8 ED WR												
Zoom	Tele	55-300	4.5-6.3																														HD DA 55-300mm f/4.5-6.3 ED PLM WR RE									
Zoom	Tele	60-250	4.0																						DA* 60-250mm f/4 ED SDM																	
Zoom	Tele	70/80-2x0	2.8								FA* 80-200mm f/2.8 ED																						HD D FA* 70-200mm f/2.8 ED DC AW									
Zoom	Tele	70/80-2x0	4.0																																		HD D FA 70-210 4 ED SDM WR					
Zoom	Tele	70/80-2x0	4-5.6	F 70-210mm f/4-5.6							FA 70-200mm f/4-5.6 ED																															
Zoom	Tele	100-300	4.5-5.6						FA 100-300mm f/4.5-5.6																																	
Zoom	Tele	150-450	4.5-5.6																														D FA 150-450mm f/4.5-5.6 ED DC AW									
Zoom	Tele	250-600	5.6		F* 250-600 ED			FA* 250-600 f/5.6 ED																																		
Teleconverter				F 1.7X AF																											HD DA 1.4X AW											
Kind	Type	Focal length	Aperture	87	88	89	1990	91	92	93	94	95	96	97	98	99	2000	01	02	03	04	05	06	07	08	09	2010	11	12	13	14	15	16	17	18	19	2020	21	22	23	24	25
