= Pentax lenses =

Photographic lenses sold under the Pentax brand

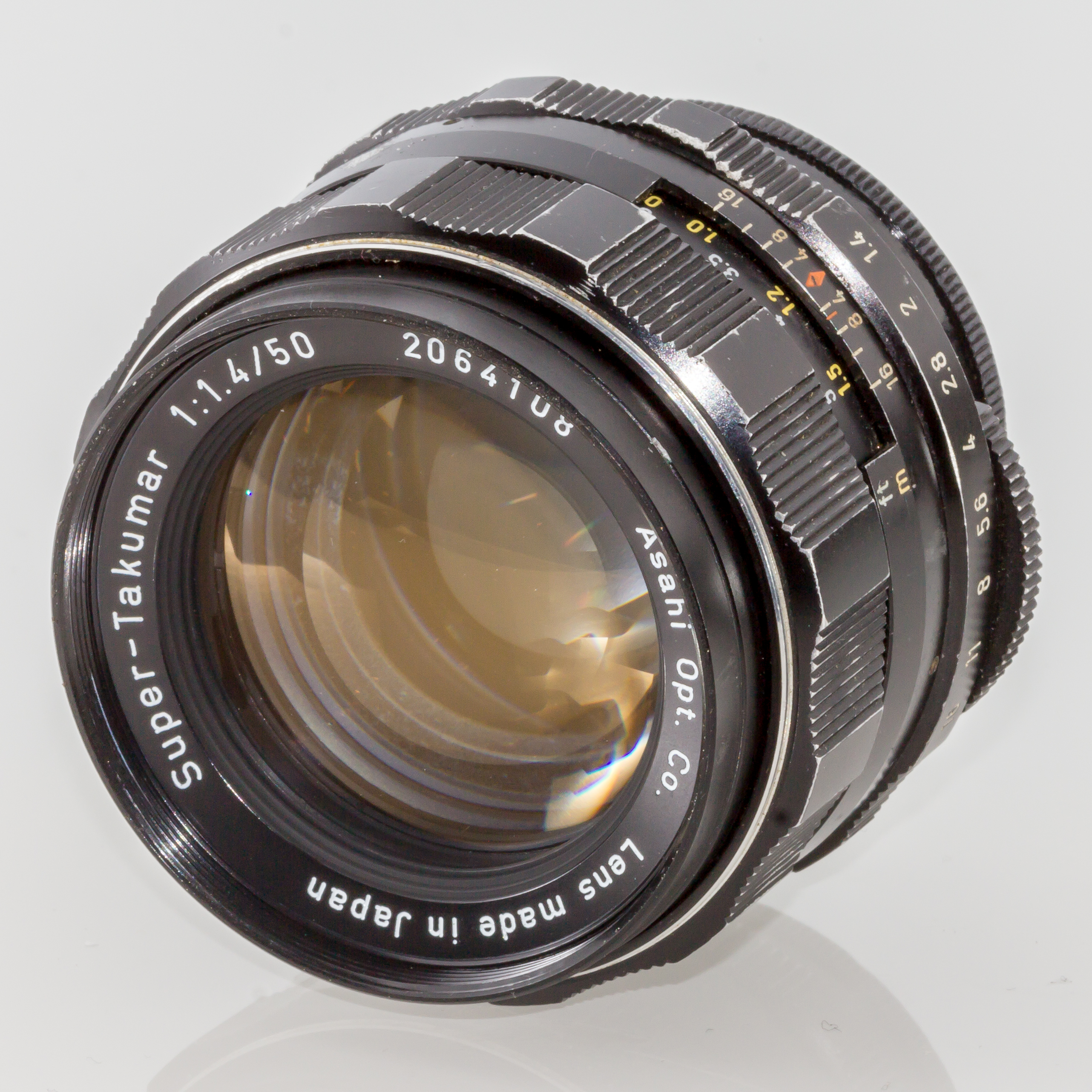
Super-Takumar 50mm f/1.4

Pentax lenses are designed for interchangeable-lens cameras using 120 film and 135 film sizes; they are manufactured and sold by Asahi Optical Company and its successors: Pentax, Hoya and Ricoh.

They were first badged as Takumar as introduced in 1952 with the company's first camera, the Asahiflex. The Takumar branded lenses were well respected, especially the Super Takumar line, which was applied to lenses with high performance anti-reflective coatings and optical designs. Most competitors at the time were still satisfied with the variations of the single-coating process using magnesium fluoride (MgF_{2}) and later some of the two and three layer processes as well. Asahi Pentax soon introduced the Takumar Super-Multi-Coated line of lenses which was a 7 layer process as the industry had just caught up with similar forms of 5 layer multi-coated optics.

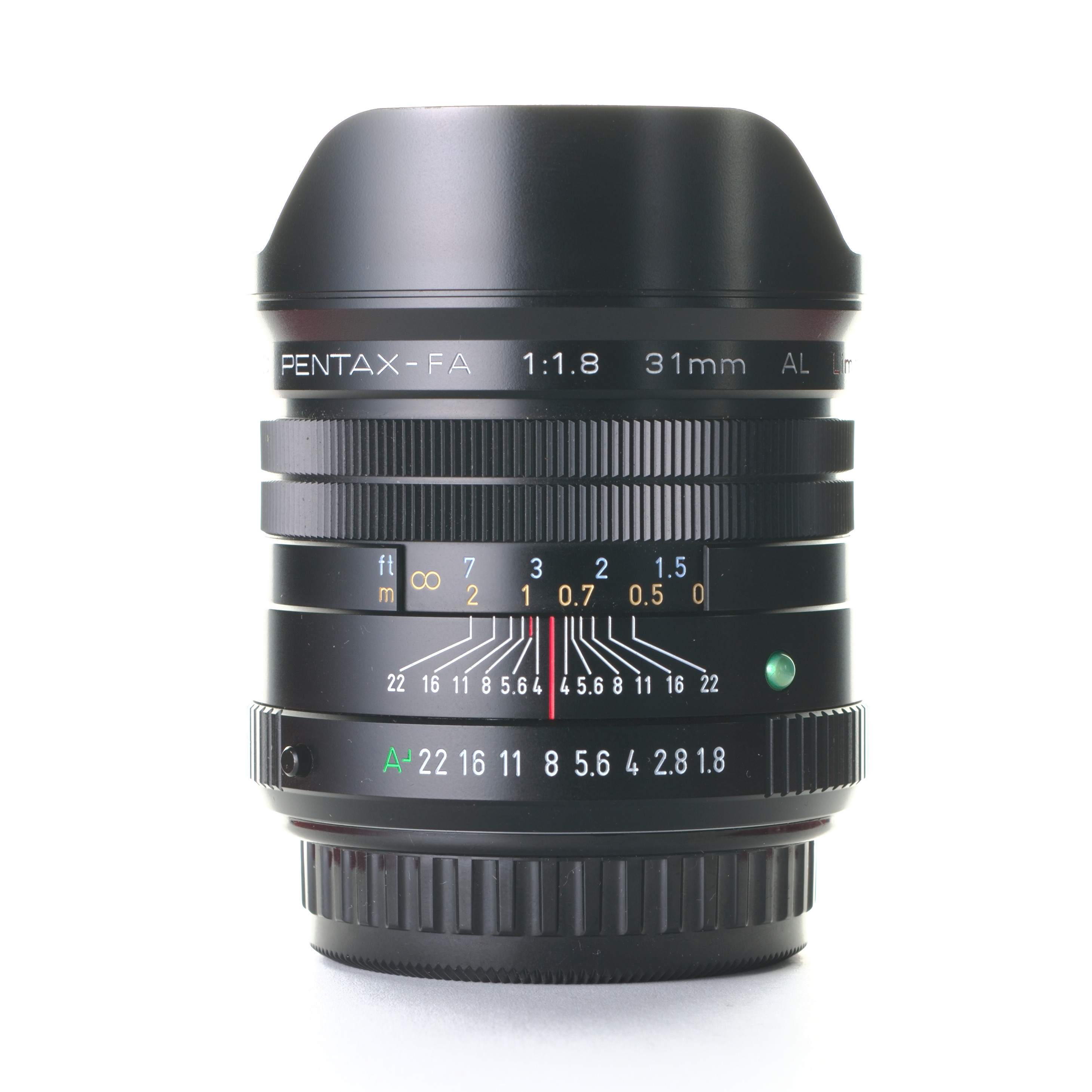
Pentax smc FA 31mm F1.8 Limited

Eventually Asahi Optical slowly consolidated lens production under the Pentax name and transitioned some of the successful designs that were first introduced as Takumar lenses to use Asahi/Pentax badging as well as beginning to use the "smc" abbreviation for Super-Multi-Coating. Eventually the Asahi branding faded away and the Pentax name became used exclusively. Pentax lenses saw many feature changes in response to market advancements, such as: incorporating "Auto-Aperture" with the M42 mount, the light weight and compactness with the 'M' series, Aperture Priority overrides with the 'A' series, and Auto-Focus with the 'F' series.

Modern Pentax lenses for digital SLR cameras have seen the elimination of the aperture ring completely as found on Pentax DA and D-FA series lenses. They use the Pentax K_{AF} mount (and its variants, K_{AF2}, K_{AF3} and K_{AF4}). All of these lenses have an autofocus feature, either operated from a motor in the camera body or from a silent "SDM" in-lens motor. Lenses compatible with the M42 and Pentax K mounts are also made by third-party companies.

== History ==
Number of Pentax K lenses sold over time, compared with Canon EF+RF and Nikon F

The Asahi Optical Company was founded in 1919 by Kumao Kajiwara, designing eyeglasses and binoculars. In 1940, Asahi Optical designed the Promar lens for a Chiyoda Kogaku camera, followed by the first single-lens reflex camera from Asahi, the Asahiflex, in 1952, which introduced the Takumar lens brand. In 1957, the Asahi Pentax camera was launched with the M42 mount.

Takumar brand lenses were supplied with Pentax cameras from the late 1950s until the mid-1970s using the M42 (Pentax) Screwmount. Asahi Optical soon began supplying lenses using the Pentax name from 1975, when they introduced the K bayonet mount, although Takumar-branded M42 screw lenses continued to be available new for a period.

Many of the first-generation Asahi 'K' mount lenses are adapted from the original Takumar Super-Multi-Coated designs, which include the 7-layer process multi-coated versions which originally were released for the M42 mount. The change to the bayonet also had an impact in the industry as the M42 mount had been adopted by many other camera manufacturers and photographers took advantage of the cross-compatibility between brands.

Similarly, the introduction of the 7-layer coating first used with the Takumar name and later as Pentax raised controversy. Some doubted its durability as well as its claims of flare control. Pentax's confidence in the technology was demonstrated by keeping a lock on the patent for quite a while. Asahi Optical also had active partnerships with Zeiss, Tokina, and others, sharing optical designs.

Pentax has developed many special-purpose lenses, including a lens for infrared photography using quartz elements. In addition to the 35mm line, Pentax added lenses for professional medium format 645 and 67 cameras. Pentax's digital interchangeable-lens camera bodies maintain compatibility with any Pentax K mount and even the M42 screwmount (with a Pentax adapter) ever made. 35mm and 645 lenses optimized for digital cameras are currently in production.

=== Timeline of innovations ===
- 1962: Pentax launched the world's first diagonal fisheye lens for 35mm SLR cameras: the Takumar 18mm F11 Fish-eye.
- 1965: Pentax introduced the 6x7 SLR medium format system.
- 1967: Pentax introduced the world's most efficient fish-eye lens with a maximum brightness of f/4: Takumar Fish-eye 17mm f/4.
- 1971: Pentax was the first to use SMC (Super Multi Coating) on all of their lenses. This technology was a milestone in the optical world and is considered one of the best on the market.
- 1975: World's first distortion-free ultra-wide angle lens (one aspherical element), the SMC Takumar f/3.5 15mm ultra-wide angle.
- 1981: Pentax was the first to create an TTL-autofocus camera and started the development of autofocus systems. That camera was the Pentax ME-F.
- 1984: Pentax introduces the Pentax 645 SLR medium format system.
- 1991: Pentax was the first to introduce Power Zoom on bayonet mount lenses for SLR cameras. That lenses included the FA* 250-600mm f5.6.
- 1991: Pentax was the first to introduce focusing distance measurement for SLR cameras. That technology was introduced with the FA and FA* series lenses from 1991.
- 1995: Pentax introduces the world's first fish-eye zoom lens. That lenses was the F 17-28mm F3.5-4.5 Fish-eye Zoom.
- 2000: Pentax develops and commercializes the world's first diffractive DVD/CD-compatible hybrid pickup lens.
- 2009: Pentax introduces the world's first autofocus fisheye lens. That lens is the DA 10-17mm ED (IF) Fish-Eye.
- 2011: Pentax introduces the world's smallest and lightest interchangeable lens camera (ILC). That camera was the Pentax Q.
- 2012: Pentax first introduced the HD coating as the successor of the successful SMC coating.

== Controls, features and changes ==
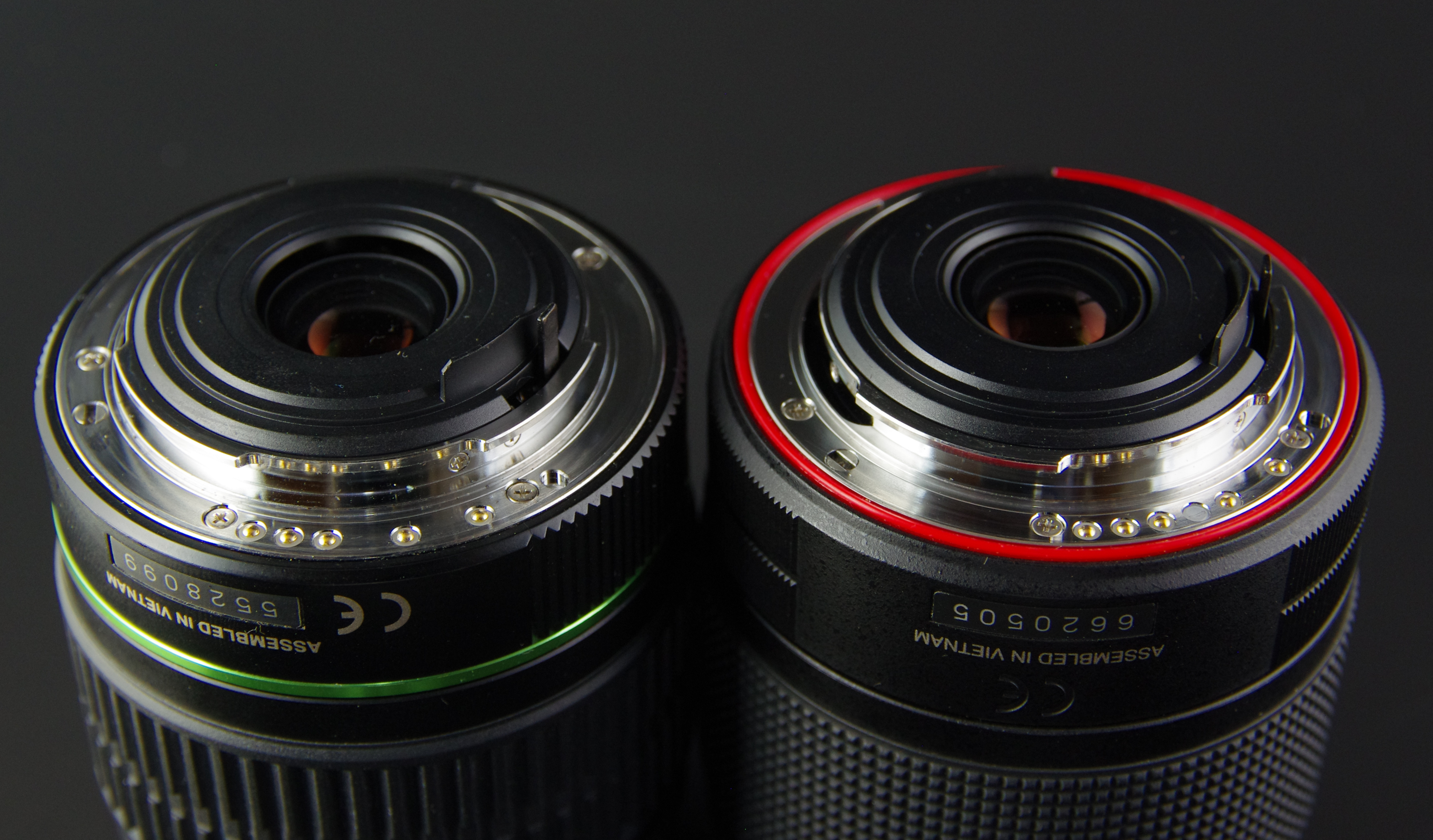
Rubber-sealing on the back of the DA 50-200mm 1-4-5.6 ED WR (red, right) compared to the non-WR version of the lens (left). There are further seals on the inside of the lens that are not externally visible.

=== Image stabilisation ===
Unlike Canon and Nikon, Pentax, as well as Sony, provides "shake reduction" (SR) functionality within the camera, instead of inside each lens to be purchased. This is advantageous as any lens can be used with full SR functionality, and the lenses are more economical to manufacture as they do not require any shake reduction equipment inside.

=== Weather sealing ===
Many Pentax lenses, like their medium- to high-end camera bodies, are weather-sealed, allowing for their continued use in poor weather and wet locations. Lenses marked as WR bear a “simplified weather-resistant construction […] which makes it difficult for water to enter the lens” compared to the DA* and AW lenses, which are “dust-proof and water-resistant”. Pentax currently provides weather-sealed premium lenses up 560 mm. The largest lens produced by Pentax was the Reflex 2000mm, with non-mirrored lenses available up to the A* 1200mm. As with most manufacturers, telephotos of this range are no longer in production. Pentax provided premium focal lengths well beyond 1200mm, such as their 3800mm through the Pentax telescope division.

=== Full manual focus ===
First introduced at Pentax 2003 with the DA 16-45mm, the Quick-Shift focus system made it possible that the focus ring don't move during autofocus operations. Also after focusing using the autofocus, the focus ring can be turned to allow immediate focus adjustment for manual focus without the need for an AF/MF switching operation.

=== Powered zoom ===
Some FA and FA* lenses did come with an integrated motor and two additional electronic contacts for power zoom functionality. This allows to change the focal length with a small twist of the zoom ring at three different speeds. Most Pentax digital SLRs today do support the first two basic functions of Power Zoom lenses.

=== Supersonic Drive Motor (SDM) ===
The Pentax-developed SDM autofocus systems, with SDM standing for "Supersonic Drive Motor", departs from the previous Pentax system which utilizes a screw-drive autofocus motor inside the camera body. Instead, SDM lenses incorporate an autofocus micro-motor as part of the lens itself. All current production Pentax Digital SLR bodies are compatible with SDM lenses. However the DA* 55mm, DA 17-70mm and DA 18-135mm lenses are not compatible with some older Pentax digital SLR's such as the K110D, first version K100D and earlier models (The K100D Super is compatible, provided it has up to date firmware).

The SDM mechanism is claimed to provide smoother and quieter focusing. The first Pentax cameras to support SDM lens were the K10D (firmware 1.30 or later) and K100D Super. These and subsequent Pentax DSLR bodies support both SDM and in-camera screw-driven AF.

== Mounts ==
- M37 (screw mount, lenses branded Takumar, used for Asahiflex only)
- M42 (screw mount, lenses branded Takumar, all other Pre-K Mount 35mm bodies, e.g. the Pentax Spotmatic)
- ES M42 Mount (Introduced in 1971. Allows open aperture metering with Super Multi-Coated Takumar lenses with Pentax ES and ESII cameras. 3rd Party ES lenses include Sigma YS, Sigma XQ, Vivitar TX, and Tamron Adaptall mounts.)
- K-mount (bayonet mount, all 35mm SLR and DSLR bodies since introduction of the K series in 1975 as well as the K-01 MILC body)
- Pentax 6×7 mount (bayonet mount, some of them branded Takumar, for the medium format Pentax 6×7 and Pentax 67 film SLR bodies)
- Pentax 645 mount (bayonet mount for the medium format Pentax 645 series SLR and DSLR bodies)
- Pentax 110 mount (bayonet mount for the 110 film Pentax Auto 110 and Pentax Auto 110 super SLR bodies)
- Q-mount (bayonet mount for the Pentax Q series MILC bodies)

== M37 mount lenses ==
Asahi-Kogaku Takumar lenses (M37 thread mount, for Asahiflex)
FL (mm)	Name	Ap.	Angle	Const.	Min. focus	Filt. (mm)	Φ×L	Wgt.	Notes
Normal lenses
50	Takumar	f/3.5–16	46°	4e/3g	2.5 ft (0.76 m)	?	?	180 g (6.3 oz)	
58	Takumar	f/2.4–22	41°	5e/3g	2 ft (0.61 m)	?	?	200 g (7.1 oz)	
Portrait lenses
83	Takumar	f/1.9–16	29°	7e/5g	3.5 ft (1.1 m)	?	?	350 g (12 oz)	
100	Takumar	f/3.5–16	24°	3e/3g	4.5 ft (1.4 m)	?	?	280 g (9.9 oz)	
135	Tele-photo Takumar	f/3.5–16	18°	5e/4g	6 ft (1.8 m)	?	?	500 g (18 oz)	
Telephoto lenses
500	Tele-photo Takumar	f/5–16	5°	2e/2g	25 ft (7.6 m)	?	?	2.85 kg (6.3 lb)	

== M42 mount lenses ==
Takumar, Super-Takumar, and Super-Multi-Coated Takumar lenses (M42 thread mount)
FL (mm)	Name	Ap.	Angle	Const.	Min. focus	Filt. (mm)	Φ×L	Wgt.	Notes
Fisheye lenses
17	Super-Takumar Fish-Eye	f/4–22	180°	11e/7g	0.2 m (7.9 in)	—N/a (built-in)	66.5×30 mm (2.62×1.18 in)	228 g (8.0 oz)	
18	Takumar	f/11–32	148°	4e/?g	—N/a (fixed)	—N/a (built-in)	?	?	Waterhouse stops
Ultra wide angle lenses
15	SMC Takumar	f/3.5–22	110°	?	0.3 m (1 ft 0 in)	—N/a (built-in)	80.0×81.5 mm (3.15×3.21 in)	570 g (20 oz)	
20	Super-Takumar	f/4.5–16	94°	11e/10g	0.2 m (7.9 in)	77	63×45 mm (2.5×1.8 in)	250 g (8.8 oz)	
Wide angle lenses
24	Super-Takumar	f/3.5–16	84°	9e/8g	0.25 m (9.8 in)	58	63×46.5 mm (2.48×1.83 in)	240 g (8.5 oz)	
28	Super-Takumar	f/3.5–16	75°	7e/7g	0.4 m (1 ft 4 in)	49	58×41.6 mm (2.28×1.64 in)	207 g (7.3 oz)	
35	Super-Takumar	f/2–16	62°	8e/7g	0.4 m (1 ft 4 in)	49	58×54 mm (2.3×2.1 in)	240 g (8.5 oz)	
35	Takumar	f/2.3–22	63°	6e/5g	0.45 m (1 ft 6 in)	?	?	310 g (11 oz)	
35	Super-Takumar	f/3.5–16	62°	5e/4g	0.45 m (1 ft 6 in)	49	56.5×34 mm (2.22×1.34 in)	149 g (5.3 oz)	
Normal lenses
50	Super-Takumar	f/1.4–16	46°	7e/6g	0.45 m (1 ft 6 in)	49	61.5×38.5 mm (2.42×1.52 in)	240 g (8.5 oz)	
55	Super-Takumar	f/1.8–16	43°	6e/5g	0.45 m (1 ft 6 in)	49	59×38 mm (2.3×1.5 in)	202 g (7.1 oz)	
55	Super-Takumar	f/2–16	43°	6e/5g	0.45 m (1 ft 6 in)	49	59×38 mm (2.3×1.5 in)	202 g (7.1 oz)	
Portrait lenses
85	Takumar	f/1.8–16	29°	5e/4g	0.85 m (2 ft 9 in)	?	?	340 g (12 oz)	
85	Super-Takumar	f/1.9–16	29°	5e/4g	0.85 m (2 ft 9 in)	58	68×58 mm (2.7×2.3 in)	340 g (12 oz)	
105	Super-Takumar	f/2.8–22	23°	5e/4g	1.2 m (3 ft 11 in)	49	59.5×63.8 mm (2.34×2.51 in)	273 g (9.6 oz)	Identically optical Takumar available with manual diaphragm
120	SMC-Takumar	f/2.8–22	20°	5e/4g	1.2 m (3 ft 11 in)	49	61×82 mm (2.4×3.2 in)	340 g (12 oz)	
135	Super-Takumar	f/2.5–22	18°	5e/4g	1.5 m (4 ft 11 in)	58	66×80.5 mm (2.60×3.17 in)	444 g (15.7 oz)	
135	Super-Takumar	f/3.5–22	18°	4e/4g	1.5 m (4 ft 11 in)	49	59.3×87.3 mm (2.33×3.44 in)	320 g (11 oz)	
135	Takumar	f/3.5–22	18°	5e/4g	2.0 m (6 ft 7 in)	?	?	300 g (11 oz)	
150	Super-Takumar	f/4–22	17°	5e/5g	1.8 m (5 ft 11 in)	49	59.3×95 mm (2.33×3.74 in)	324 g (11.4 oz)	
Telephoto lenses
200	Takumar	f/3.5–22	12°	4e/4g	2.5 m (8 ft 2 in)	67	75.1×157 mm (2.96×6.18 in)	879 g (31.0 oz)	
200	Super-Takumar	f/4–22	12°	5e/5g	2.5 m (8 ft 2 in)	58	64.7×136 mm (2.55×5.35 in)	558 g (19.7 oz)	
200	Tele-Takumar	f/5.6–22	12°	5e/5g	2.5 m (8 ft 2 in)	49	56.5×113 mm (2.22×4.45 in)	404 g (14.3 oz)	
300	Super-Takumar	f/4–22	8°	5e/5g	5.5 m (18 ft)	77	85×185.5 mm (3.35×7.30 in)	954 g (33.7 oz)	
300	Takumar	f/4–22	8°	4e/4g	5.5 m (18 ft)	82	96×243 mm (3.8×9.6 in)	1,517 g (3.344 lb)	
300	Tele-Takumar	f/6.3–22	8°	5e/5g	5.5 m (18 ft)	58	65×182.5 mm (2.56×7.19 in)	706 g (24.9 oz)	
400	Tele-Takumar	f/5.6–45	6°	5e/5g	8 m (26 ft)	77	85×275 mm (3.3×10.8 in)	1,255 g (2.767 lb)	
500	Takumar	f/4.5–45	5°	4e/4g	10 m (33 ft)	49	126.5×440 mm (4.98×17.32 in)	3,500 g (7.7 lb)	
500	Takumar	f/5–22	5°	2e/1g	10 m (33 ft)	?	?	2,850 g (6.28 lb)	
1000	Tele-Takumar	f/8–45	2.5°	5e/5g	30 m (98 ft)	49	143×728 mm (5.6×28.7 in)	5,500 g (12.1 lb)	
1000	Takumar	f/8–22	2.5°	3e/?g	30 m (98 ft)	?	?	7,500 g (16.5 lb)	
Special lenses
50	Super-Macro-Takumar	f/4–22	46°	4e/3g	0.234 m (9.2 in)	49	61×54.5 mm (2.40×2.15 in)	236 g (8.3 oz)	
50	Macro-Takumar	f/4–22	46°	4e/3g	0.255 m (10.0 in)	49	59×56 mm (2.3×2.2 in)	257 g (9.1 oz)	
100	Bellows-Takumar	f/4–22	24.5°	5e/3g	—N/a	49	54.4×36 mm (2.14×1.42 in)	139 g (4.9 oz)	
85	Ultra-Achromatic-Takumar	f/4.5–22	29°	5e/5g	0.6 m (2 ft 0 in)	49	60×60.5 mm (2.36×2.38 in)	250 g (8.8 oz)	Uses all-fluorite elements for infrared and ultraviolet photography
300	Ultra-Achromatic-Takumar	f/5.6–22	8°	5e/5g	4.85 m (15.9 ft)	58	68×225 mm (2.7×8.9 in)	815 g (28.7 oz)	Corrected for infrared photography
Zoom lenses
45–125	SMC Takumar	f/4–22	50.5–20°	?	2.0 m (6 ft 7 in)	67	68.4×127 mm (2.69×5.00 in)	605 g (21.3 oz)	
70–150	Super-Takumar-Zoom	f/4.5–22	35–17°	14e/12g	3.5 m (11 ft)	67	74.5×224 mm (2.93×8.82 in)	1,140 g (2.51 lb)	
85–210	SMC-Takumar-Zoom	f/4.5–22	28°5'–11°5'	11e/10g	3.5 m (11 ft)	58	66.5×217.5 mm (2.62×8.56 in)	705 g (24.9 oz)	
135–600	SMC Takumar	f/6.7–45	18–4°	?	6.0 m (19.7 ft)	49	105×585 mm (4.1×23.0 in)	4,050 g (8.93 lb)	

== K-mount lenses ==
=== K lenses ===
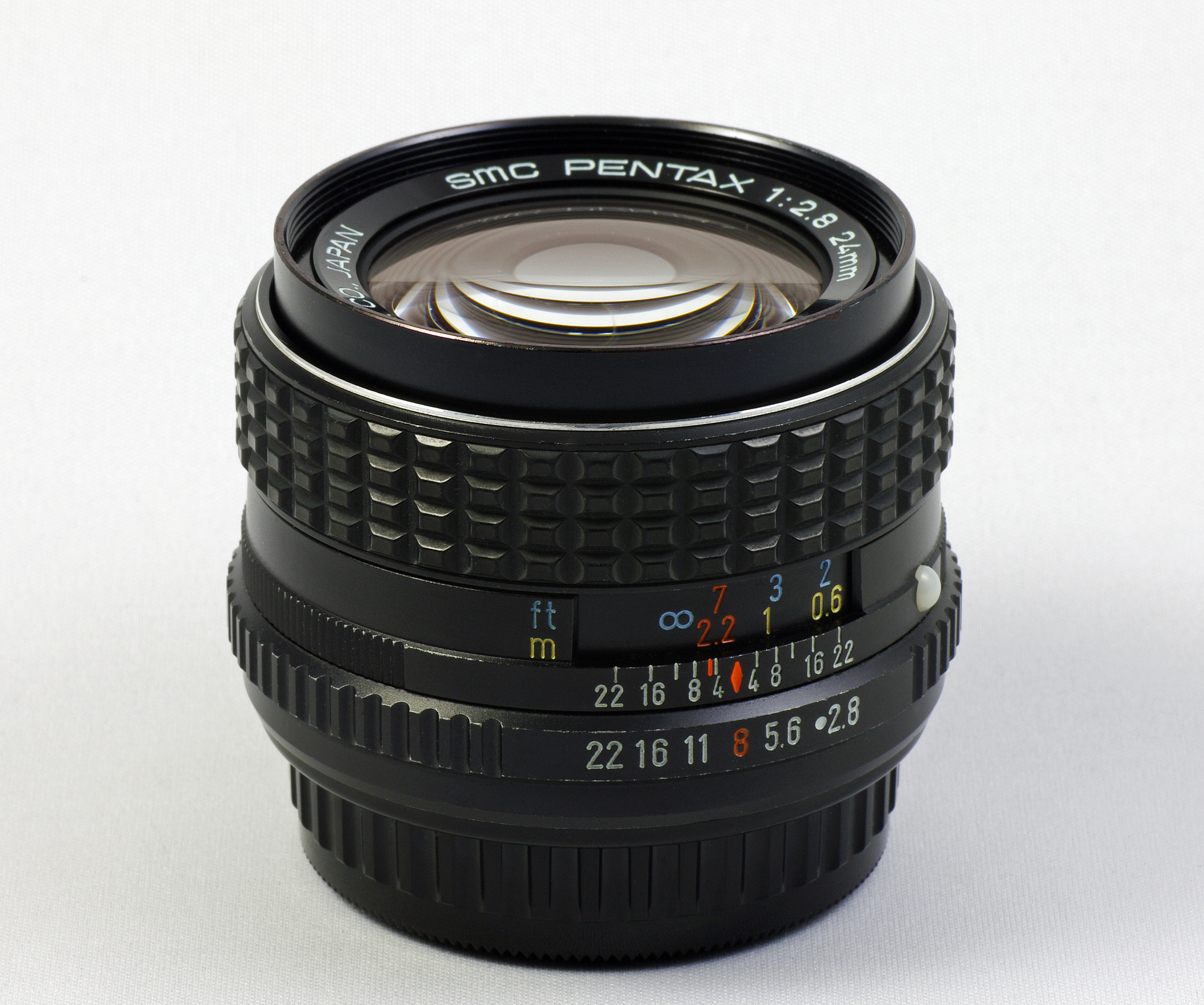
smc Pentax 24mm f/2.8

The first generation of Pentax K-mount lenses. Officially not referred to as K series lenses, they usually are given this designation to distinguish them from later K-mount lenses (such as the M, A, F, FA and DA series). These were exclusively manual focus lenses with no electronic features. The name of each lens started with an upper case "SMC" for the earlier versions and the lower case "smc" for the later versions. For example, SMC/smc Pentax 28mm F3.5, where SMC/smc stands for Super-Multi-Coated, the lens coating introduced in the early 1970s at the end of the M42-mount era.

Pentax manual focus lenses (K-mount)
FL (mm)	Name	Year	Aperture	Angle (°)	Construc.	Min. focus	Filter (mm)	Diameter × Length	Weight	Notes
Ultra-wide angle
15	SMC Pentax	1975	f/3.5–22	111	13 ele – 12 grp	0.3 m (1 ft 0 in)	—N/a (built-in)	80×81.5 mm (3.15×3.21 in)	550 g (19 oz)	Uses aspheric surfaces
18	SMC Pentax	1975	f/3.5–22	100	12 ele – 11 grp	0.25 m (9.8 in)	—N/a (built-in)	63×61.5 mm (2.48×2.42 in)	328 g (11.6 oz)	
20	SMC Pentax	1976	f/4–22	94	12 ele – 10 grp	0.25 m (9.8 in)	58	63×57 mm (2.5×2.2 in)	300 g (11 oz)	
Wide angle
24	SMC Pentax	1975	f/3.5–22	84	9 ele – 8 grp	0.25 m (9.8 in)	58	63×46.5 mm (2.48×1.83 in)	250 g (8.8 oz)	
24	SMC Pentax	1977	f/2.8–22	84	9 ele – 8 grp	0.25 m (9.8 in)	52	63×41.5 mm (2.48×1.63 in)	194 g (6.8 oz)	
28	SMC Pentax	1976	f/2–22	75	9 ele – 8 grp	0.3 m (1 ft 0 in)	52	62.5×69 mm (2.46×2.72 in)	423 g (14.9 oz)	
28	SMC Pentax	1976	f/3.5–22	75	8 ele – 7 grp	0.3 m (1 ft 0 in)	52	63×47 mm (2.5×1.9 in)	261 g (9.2 oz)	
30	SMC Pentax	1975	f/2.8–22	72	7 ele – 7 grp	0.3 m (1 ft 0 in)	52	63×39.5 mm (2.48×1.56 in)	215 g (7.6 oz)	
35	SMC Pentax	1975	f/2–22	63	8 ele – 7 grp	0.35 m (1 ft 2 in)	52	63×56 mm (2.5×2.2 in)	295 g (10.4 oz)	
35	SMC Pentax	1975	f/3.5–22	63	5 ele – 4 grp	0.35 m (1 ft 2 in)	52	56.5×34 mm (2.22×1.34 in)	160 g (5.6 oz)	
Normal
50	SMC Pentax	1975	f/1.2–22	47	7 ele – 6 grp	0.45 m (1 ft 6 in)	49	65×48.5 mm (2.56×1.91 in)	385 g (13.6 oz)	
50	SMC Pentax	1975	f/1.4–22	47	7 ele – 6 grp	0.45 m (1 ft 6 in)	49	63×42 mm (2.5×1.7 in)	265 g (9.3 oz)	
55	SMC Pentax	1975	f/1.8–22	43	6 ele – 5 grp	0.45 m (1 ft 6 in)	52	59×38 mm (2.3×1.5 in)	200 g (7.1 oz)	
55	SMC Pentax	1976	f/2–22	43	6 ele – 5 grp	0.45 m (1 ft 6 in)	52	59×38 mm (2.3×1.5 in)	200 g (7.1 oz)	
Portrait
85	SMC Pentax	1975	f/1.8–22	29	6 ele – 6 grp	0.85 m (2 ft 9 in)	52	64×56 mm (2.5×2.2 in)	331 g (11.7 oz)	
105	SMC Pentax	1975	f/2.8–22	23	5 ele – 4 grp	1.2 m (3 ft 11 in)	52	59.5×63.8 mm (2.34×2.51 in)	290 g (10 oz)	
120	SMC Pentax	1975	f/2.8–32	20.5	5 ele – 4 grp	1.2 m (3 ft 11 in)	52	62.5×74.5 mm (2.46×2.93 in)	355 g (12.5 oz)	
135	SMC Pentax	1975	f/2.5–32	18	6 ele – 6 grp	1.5 m (4 ft 11 in)	58	67.5×85.9 mm (2.66×3.38 in)	470 g (17 oz)	
135	SMC Pentax	1975	f/3.5–32	18	4 ele – 4 grp	1.5 m (4 ft 11 in)	52	63×88 mm (2.5×3.5 in)	365 g (12.9 oz)	
Telephoto
150	SMC Pentax	1975	f/4–32	17	5 ele – 5 grp	1.8 m (5 ft 11 in)	52	62.5×96 mm (2.46×3.78 in)	338 g (11.9 oz)	
200	SMC Pentax	1977	f/2.5–32	12	6 ele – 6 grp	2.0 m (6 ft 7 in)	77	89×145 mm (3.5×5.7 in)	1,019 g (2.247 lb)	
200	SMC Pentax	1975	f/4–32	12	5 ele – 5 grp	2.0 m (6 ft 7 in)	58	65×137 mm (2.6×5.4 in)	535 g (1.179 lb)	
300	SMC Pentax	1975	f/4–32	8	7 ele – 5 grp	4.0 m (13.1 ft)	77	85×188 mm (3.3×7.4 in)	942 g (2.077 lb)	
Super telephoto
400	SMC Pentax	1975	f/5.6–45	9	5 ele – 5 grp	8.0 m (26.2 ft)	77	85×277 mm (3.3×10.9 in)	1,240 g (2.73 lb)	
500	SMC Pentax	1975	f/4.5–45	5	4 ele – 4 grp	10.0 m (32.8 ft)	52	126.5×440 mm (4.98×17.32 in)	3,330 g (7.34 lb)	
1000	SMC Pentax	1975	f/8–45	2.5	5 ele – 5 grp	30.0 m (98.4 ft)	52	143×738 mm (5.6×29.1 in)	5,250 g (11.57 lb)	
1000	SMC Pentax Reflex	1977	f/11	2.5	6 ele – 4 grp	8.0 m (26.2 ft)	52 (built-in)	119×248 mm (4.7×9.8 in)	2,300 g (5.1 lb)	
2000	SMC Pentax Reflex	1979	f/13.5	1.2	6 ele – 4 grp	20.0 m (65.6 ft)	52 (built-in)	180×530 mm (7.1×20.9 in)	8,000 g (18 lb)	
Special
17	SMC Pentax Fish-Eye	1975	f/4–22	180	11 ele – 7 grp	0.2 m (7.9 in)	—N/a (built-in)	64.5×34 mm (2.54×1.34 in)	234 g (8.3 oz)	
28	SMC Pentax Shift	1975	f/3.5–22	75	12 ele – 11 grp	0.3 m (1 ft 0 in)	—N/a (built-in)	80×92.5 mm (3.15×3.64 in)	611 g (21.6 oz)	
50	SMC Pentax Macro	1975	f/4–32	46	4 ele – 3 grp	0.234 m (9.2 in)	52	63×54 mm (2.5×2.1 in)	241 g (8.5 oz)	
85	SMC Pentax Soft	1986	f/2.2–5.6	29	2 ele – 1 grp	0.57 m (1 ft 10 in)	49	72×52 mm (2.8×2.0 in)	235 g (8.3 oz)	
100	SMC Pentax Macro	1975	f/4–32	24.5	5 ele – 3 grp	0.45 m (1 ft 6 in)	52	65×81.5 mm (2.56×3.21 in)	370 g (13 oz)	
100	SMC Pentax Bellows	1975	f/4–32	24.5	5 ele – 3 grp	—N/a	52	60×40 mm (2.4×1.6 in)	186 g (6.6 oz)	
Zoom
28~50	SMC Pentax Zoom	1975	f/3.5–32	75~65	10 ele – 10 grp	1.5 m (4 ft 11 in)	52	65×52 mm (2.6×2.0 in)	315 g (11.1 oz)	
45~125	SMC Pentax Zoom	1975	f/4–22	50.5~20	14 ele – 11 grp	1.5 m (4 ft 11 in)	67	69×127 mm (2.7×5.0 in)	612 g (21.6 oz)	
80~200	SMC Pentax Zoom	1977	f/4.5–32	30~12	15 ele – 12 grp	1.6 m (5 ft 3 in)	52	65×142 mm (2.6×5.6 in)	555 g (1.224 lb)	
85~210	SMC Pentax Zoom	1976	f/3.5–32	29~12	12 ele – 11 grp	3.5 m (11 ft)	67	76.5×207.5 mm (3.01×8.17 in)	1,050 g (2.31 lb)	
85~210	SMC Pentax Zoom	1975	f/4.5–32	29~12	11 ele – 10 grp	3.5 m (11 ft)	58	68×218 mm (2.7×8.6 in)	729 g (1.607 lb)	
135~600	SMC Pentax Zoom	1975	f/6.7–45	18~4	15 ele – 12 grp	6.0 m (19.7 ft)	52	105×582 mm (4.1×22.9 in)	4,070 g (8.97 lb)	
400~600	SMC Pentax Reflex Zoom	1984	f/8~12	6.2~4.1	12 ele – 7 grp	3.0 m (9.8 ft)	67F / 40.5R	82×108 mm (3.2×4.3 in)	730 g (26 oz)	

=== M lenses ===
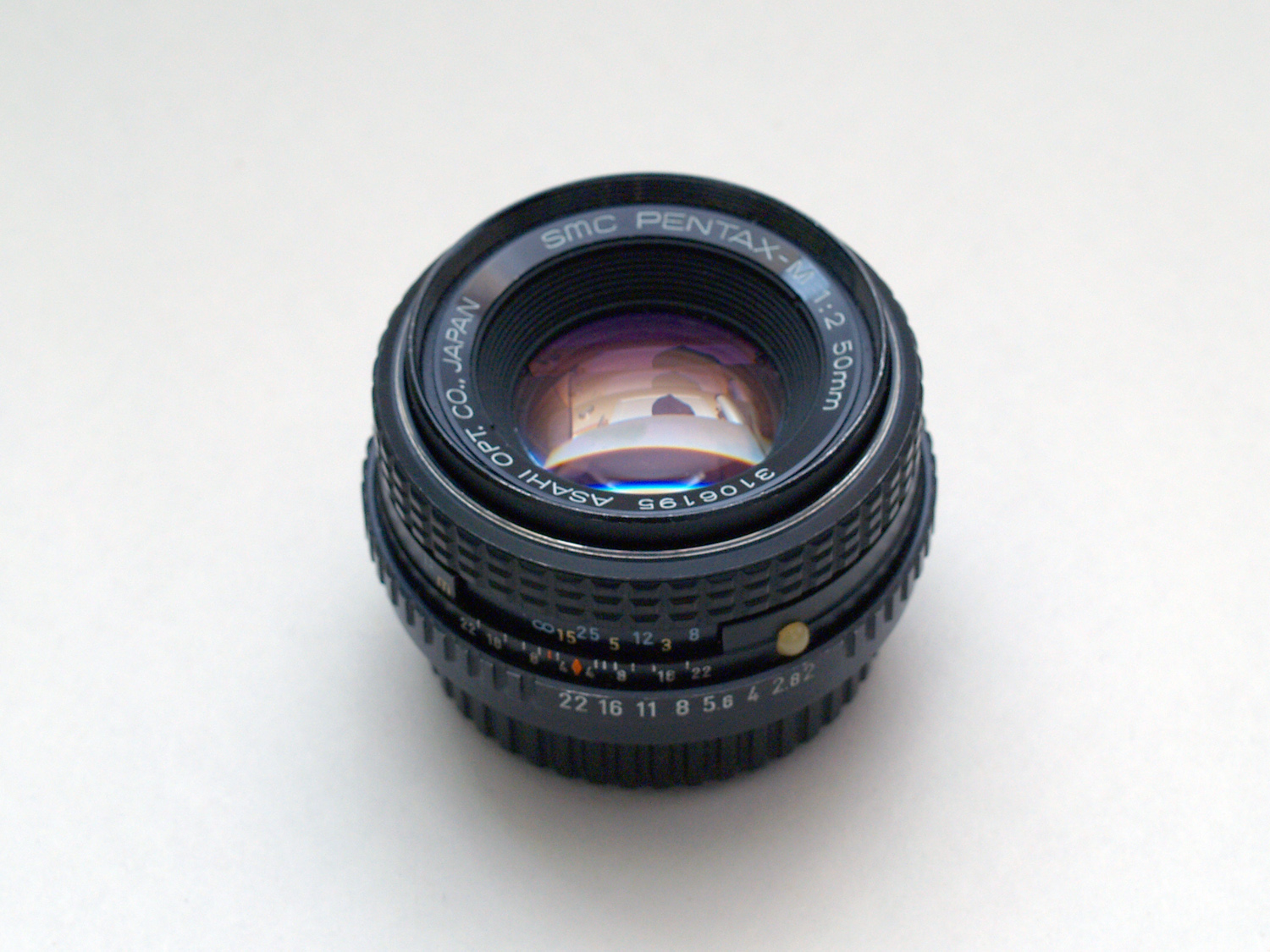
smc Pentax-M 50mm f/2

The M series of lenses followed on from the earlier K series lenses. As with the earlier lenses, these were manual K-mount lenses without any electronic features. They behave just like the K series but are generally smaller in size, to match the more compact bodies of the same era, e.g. the Pentax MX and the Pentax ME Super.

Pentax manual focus lenses (K-mount)
FL (mm)	Name	Ap.	Angle (°)	Const.	Min. focus	Filt. (mm)	Φ×L	Wgt.	Notes
Ultra-wide angle
20	SMC Pentax	f/4–22	95	8e/8g	0.25 m (9.8 in)	49	63×29.5 mm (2.48×1.16 in)	150 g (5.3 oz)	
Wide angle
28	SMC Pentax	f/2–22	75	8e/7g	0.3 m (1 ft 0 in)	49	63×41.5 mm (2.48×1.63 in)	215 g (7.6 oz)	
28	SMC Pentax	f/2.8–22	75	7e/7g	0.3 m (1 ft 0 in)	49	63×31 mm (2.5×1.2 in)	156 g (5.5 oz)	
28	SMC Pentax	f/3.5–22	75	6e/6g	0.3 m (1 ft 0 in)	49	63×31.5 mm (2.48×1.24 in)	180 g (6.3 oz)	
35	SMC Pentax	f/2–22	62	7e/7g	0.3 m (1 ft 0 in)	49	63×42 mm (2.5×1.7 in)	205 g (7.2 oz)	
35	SMC Pentax	f/2.8–22	62	6e/6g	0.3 m (1 ft 0 in)	49	63×35.5 mm (2.48×1.40 in)	174 g (6.1 oz)	
Normal
40	SMC Pentax	f/2.8–22	56	5e/4g	0.60 m (2 ft 0 in)	49	63×18 mm (2.48×0.71 in)	110 g (3.9 oz)	
50	SMC Pentax	f/1.4–22	46	7e/6g	0.45 m (1 ft 6 in)	49	63×37 mm (2.5×1.5 in)	238 g (8.4 oz)	
50	SMC Pentax	f/1.7–22	46	6e/5g	0.45 m (1 ft 6 in)	49	63×31 mm (2.5×1.2 in)	185 g (6.5 oz)	
50	SMC Pentax	f/2–22	46	5e/5g	0.45 m (1 ft 6 in)	49	63×31 mm (2.5×1.2 in)	170 g (6.0 oz)	
Portrait
85	SMC Pentax	f/2–22	29	5e/4g	0.85 m (2 ft 9 in)	49	62.5×46 mm (2.46×1.81 in)	250 g (8.8 oz)	
100	SMC Pentax	f/2.8–22	24.5	5e/5g	1.0 m (3 ft 3 in)	49	62.5×55.7 mm (2.46×2.19 in)	225 g (7.9 oz)	
120	SMC Pentax	f/2.8–32	20.5	5e/5g	1.2 m (3 ft 11 in)	49	62.5×63 mm (2.46×2.48 in)	270 g (9.5 oz)	
135	SMC Pentax	f/3.5–32	18	5e/5g	1.5 m (4 ft 11 in)	49	62.5×65.7 mm (2.46×2.59 in)	276 g (9.7 oz)	
Telephoto
150	SMC Pentax	f/3.5–32	17	5e/5g	1.8 m (5 ft 11 in)	49	62.5×75 mm (2.46×2.95 in)	290 g (10 oz)	
200	SMC Pentax	f/4–45	12	6e/5g	2.0 m (6 ft 7 in)	52	63.5×111 mm (2.50×4.37 in)	405 g (14.3 oz)	
300	SMC Pentax	f/4–32	8	8e/7g	4.0 m (13.1 ft)	77	84×132 mm (3.3×5.2 in)	825 g (29.1 oz)	
Super telephoto
400	SMC Pentax	f/5.6–45	9	5e/5g	5.0 m (16.4 ft)	77	85×276.5 mm (3.35×10.89 in)	1,220 g (2.69 lb)	
Special
50	SMC Pentax Macro	f/4–32	46	4e/3g	0.234 m (9.2 in)	49	63×42.5 mm (2.48×1.67 in)	160 g (5.6 oz)	
100	SMC Pentax Macro	f/4–32	24.5	5e/3g	0.45 m (1 ft 6 in)	49	64.6×77.5 mm (2.54×3.05 in)	355 g (12.5 oz)	
Zoom
24~35	SMC Pentax Zoom	f/3.5–22	84~63	9e/9g	0.5 m (1 ft 8 in)	58	64×48 mm (2.5×1.9 in)	290 g (10 oz)	
24~50	SMC Pentax Zoom	f/4–22	84~47	12e/10g	0.4 m (1 ft 4 in)	58	64×66.5 mm (2.52×2.62 in)	380 g (13 oz)	
28~50	SMC Pentax Zoom	f/3.5~4.5–22	75~47	10e/10g	0.6 m (2 ft 0 in)	52	65×52 mm (2.6×2.0 in)	310 g (11 oz)	
35~70	SMC Pentax Zoom AF	f/2.8–22	63~34.5	7e/7g	1.2 m (3 ft 11 in)	58	73×76.5 mm (2.87×3.01 in)	580 g (20 oz)	
35~70	SMC Pentax Zoom	f/2.8~3.5–22	63~34.5	7e/7g	1.0 m (3 ft 3 in)	67	67×76 mm (2.6×3.0 in)	470 g (17 oz)	
40~80	SMC Pentax Zoom	f/2.8~4–22	57~30.5	7e/7g	1.2 m (3 ft 11 in)	49	65.5×76 mm (2.58×2.99 in)	395 g (13.9 oz)	
75~150	SMC Pentax Zoom	f/4–32	32~16.5	12e/9g	1.2 m (3 ft 11 in)	49	63.5×111 mm (2.50×4.37 in)	465 g (16.4 oz)	
80~200	SMC Pentax Zoom	f/4.5–32	30.5~12.5	15e/12g	1.6 m (5 ft 3 in)	52	65×141.5 mm (2.56×5.57 in)	560 g (20 oz)	

=== A lenses ===
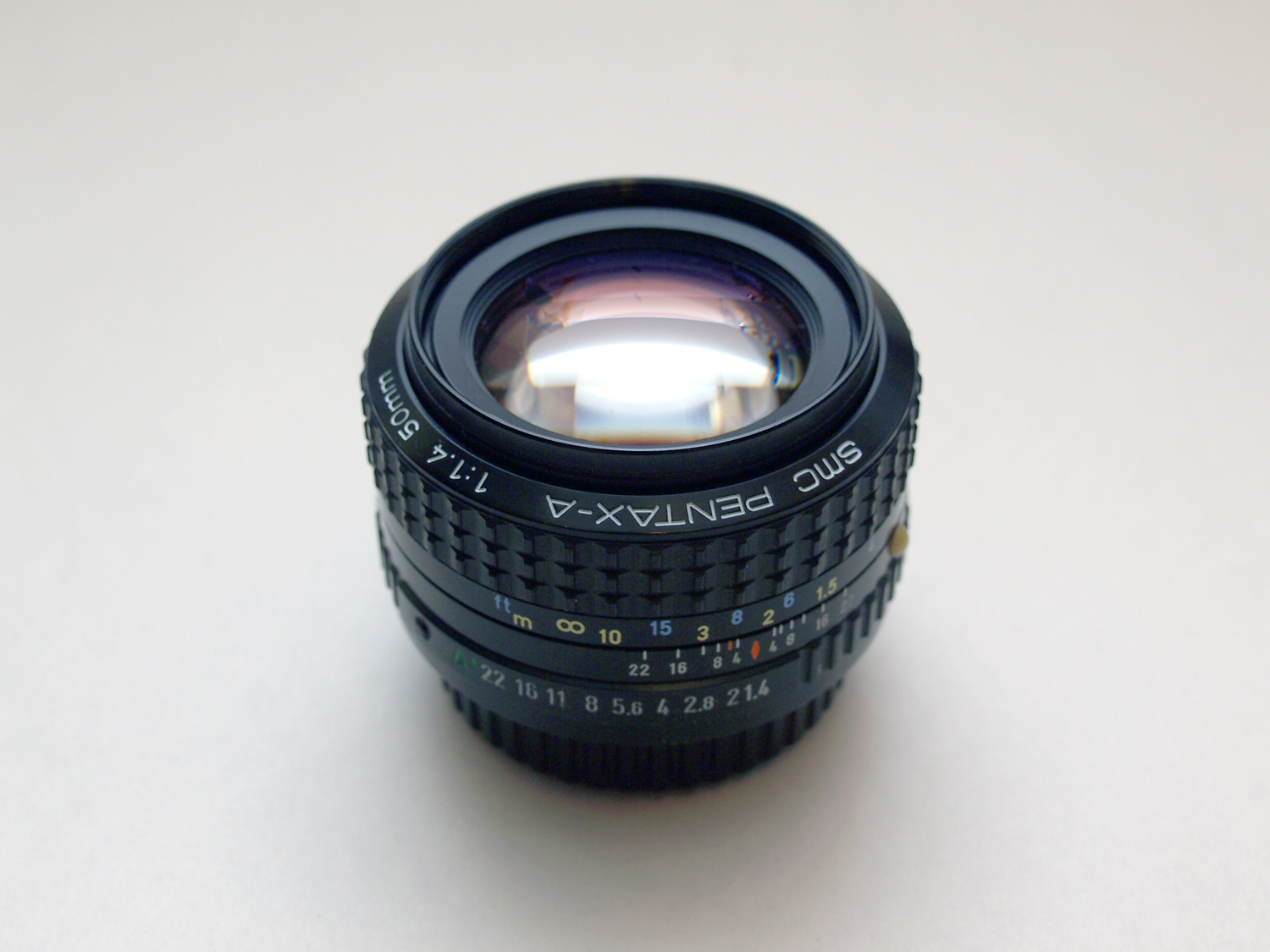
smc Pentax-A 50mm f/1.4

Another K-mount lens, the A series of lenses saw the introduction of "automatic" aperture settings. The lenses had an aperture ring (unlike the later DA series), and thus the aperture could be set manually, but they also had an "A" mode, which allowed the camera to control the aperture automatically.

=== F lenses ===
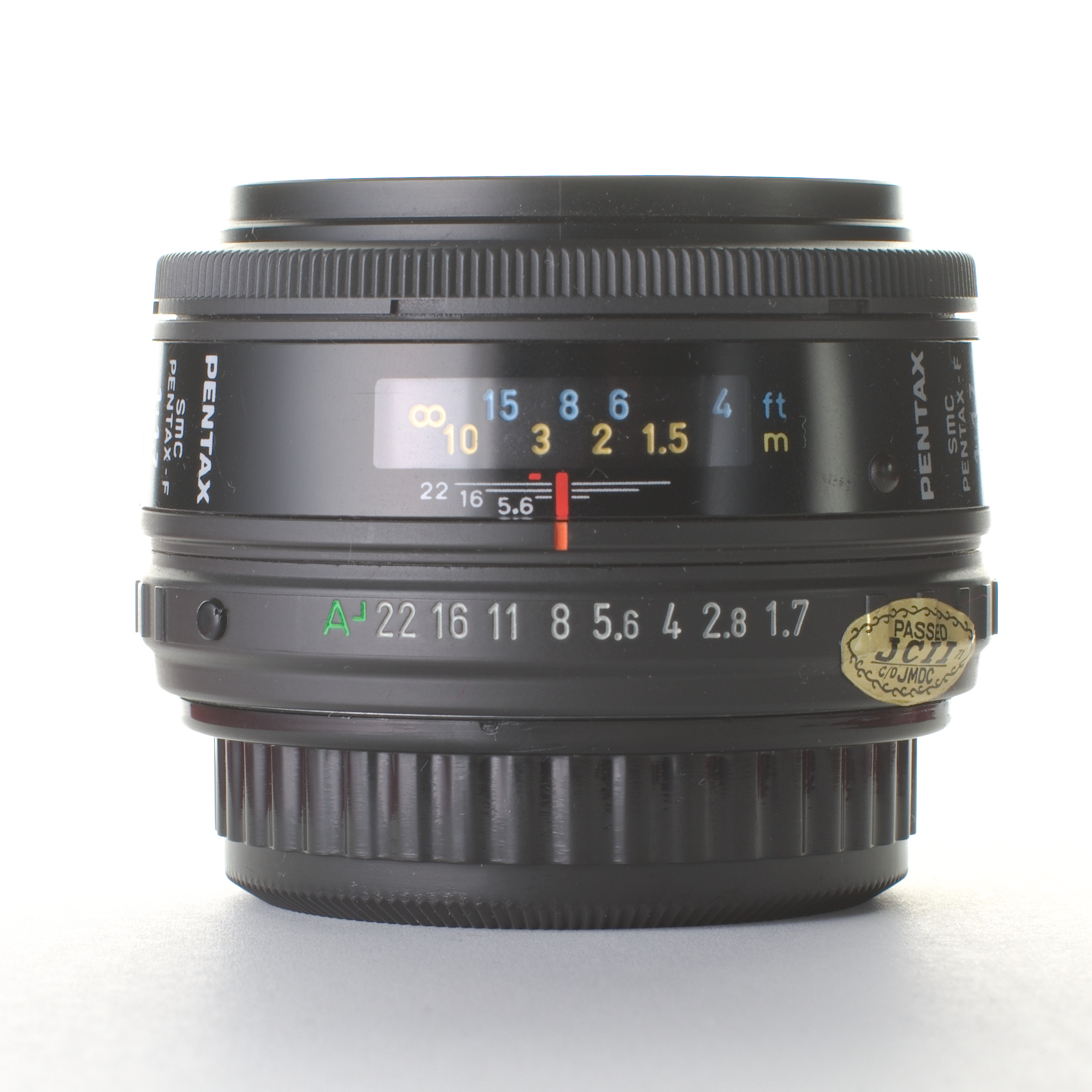
SMC Pentax-F 50mm f/1.7

The F series were the first autofocus lenses (excluding the rare smc Pentax-AF 35-70mm F2.8, made only for the ME-F camera). The autofocus is driven by an in-body motor through a mechanical coupling, still supported by all Pentax DSLRs. They featured an aperture ring, which allowed the aperture to be controlled manually. Thus F lenses are able to be used on older cameras which do not support automatic setting of the aperture, such as the Pentax K1000.

=== FA lenses ===
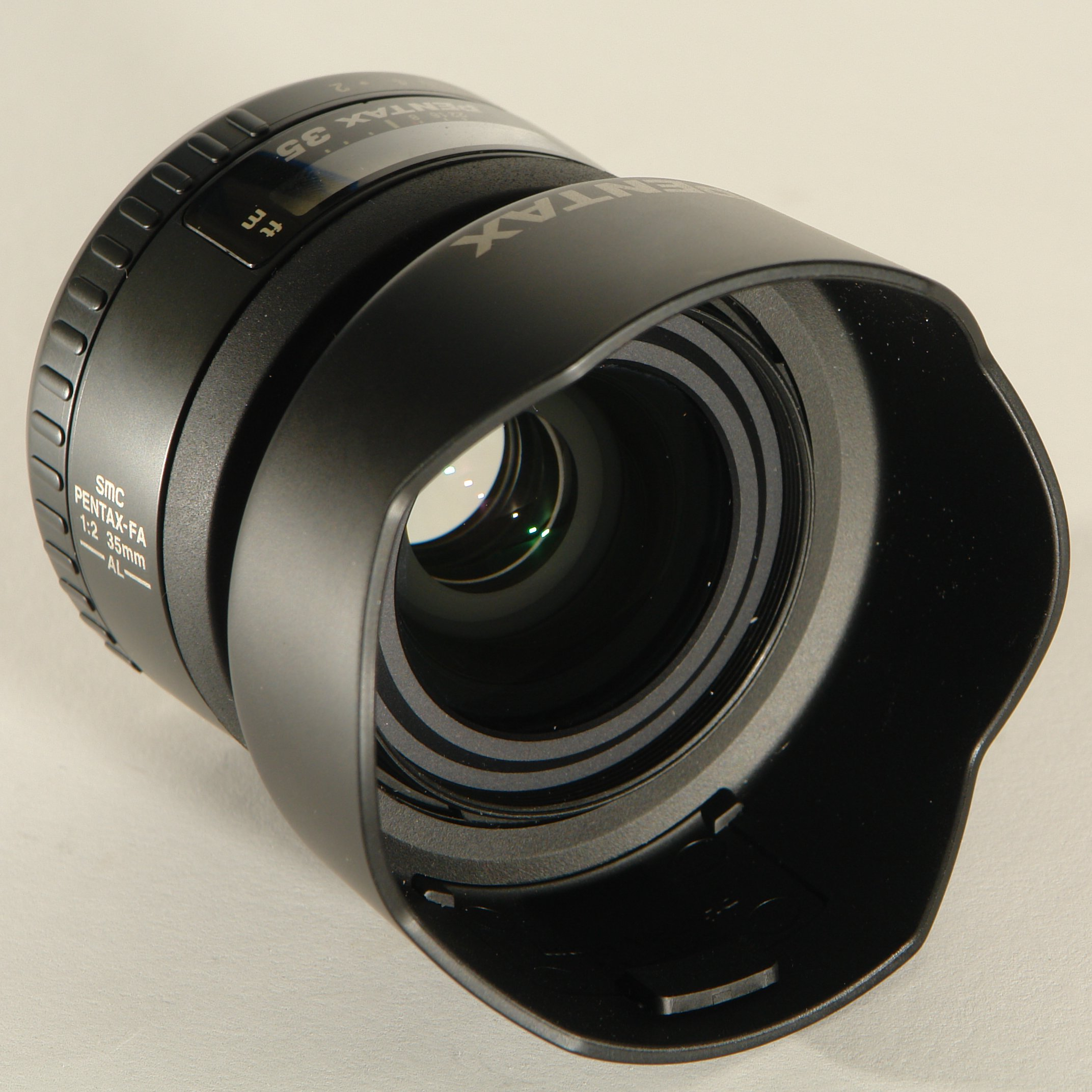
smc Pentax-FA 35mm f/2 AL

These lenses are designed with use for full-frame film SLR cameras. As with the F series, they feature an aperture ring providing compatibility with older camera bodies. Autofocus is like the F series of screw-drive type. The FA* lenses are professional grade lenses and the FA Limited lenses are all metal high quality primes. The FA series has been superseded by the DA and D FA series optimized for digital cameras, but as of March 2017 the three FA limited as well as the FA 35 mm f2 and 50 mm f1.4 are still in production.

==== FA Limited lenses ====
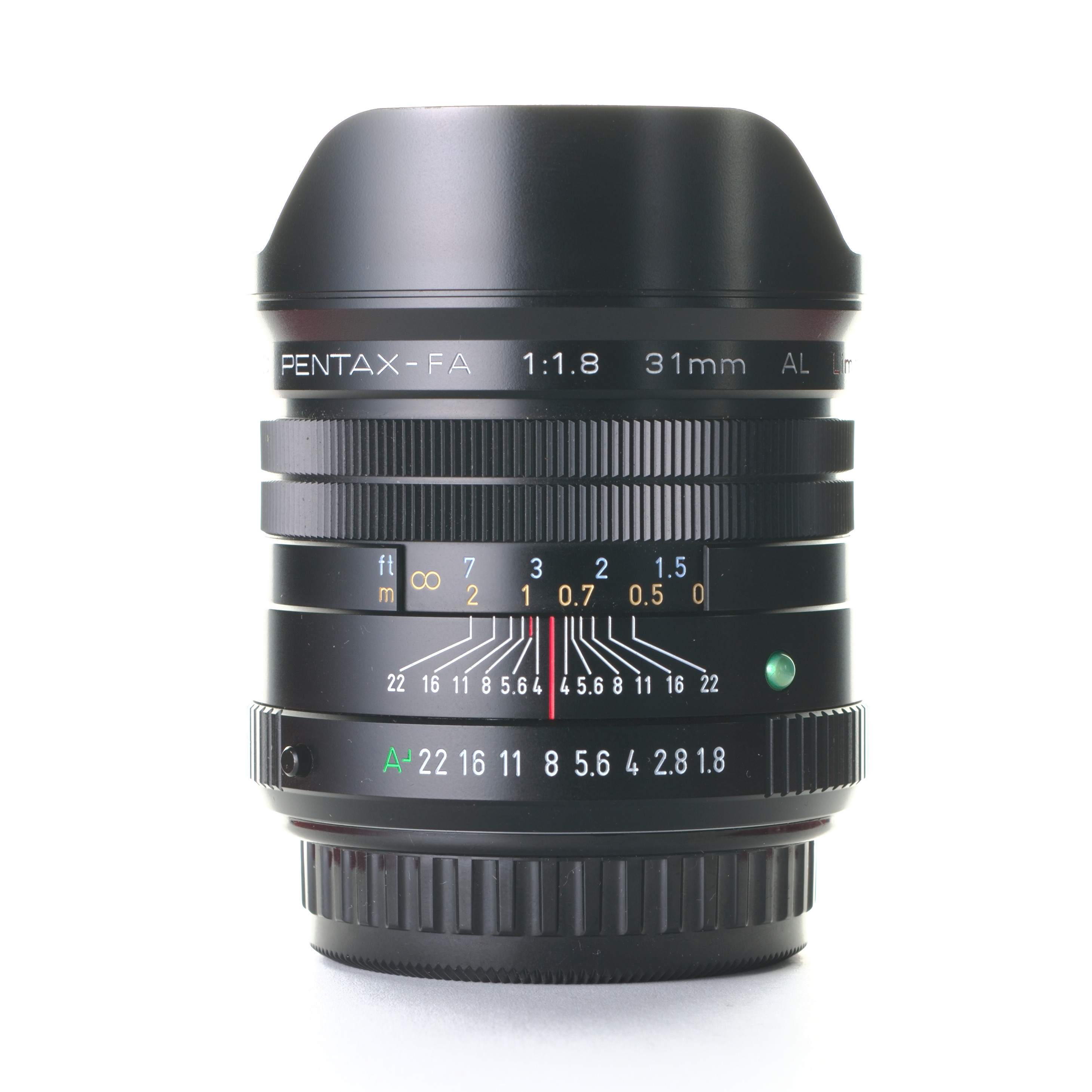
smc Pentax-FA Limited 31mm f/1.8 AL

The FA Limited lenses use generally all-metal construction.

==== FA* lenses ====
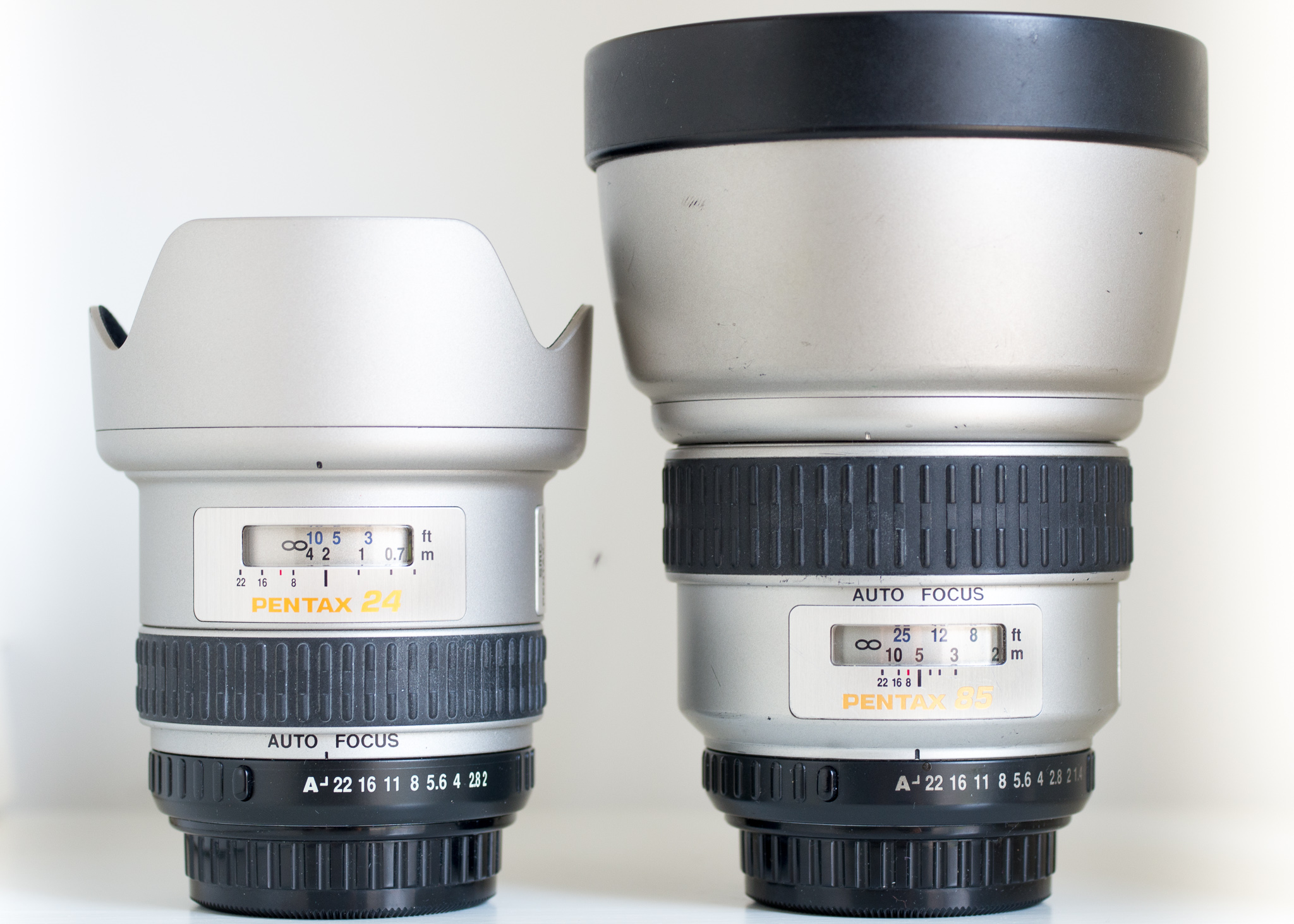
smc Pentax-FA* 24mm f/2 (left) and 85mm f/1.4 (right)

Pentax used FA* to designate professional grade lenses.

==== FA-J lenses ====
The FA-J series consisted of three lower-priced zoom lenses, that were largely identical to the FA series of lenses, but like later DA series lenses lacked the aperture ring. As a result, they are not fully compatible with some older manual film cameras, as there was no method of setting the aperture other than through the camera body.

=== D FA lenses ===
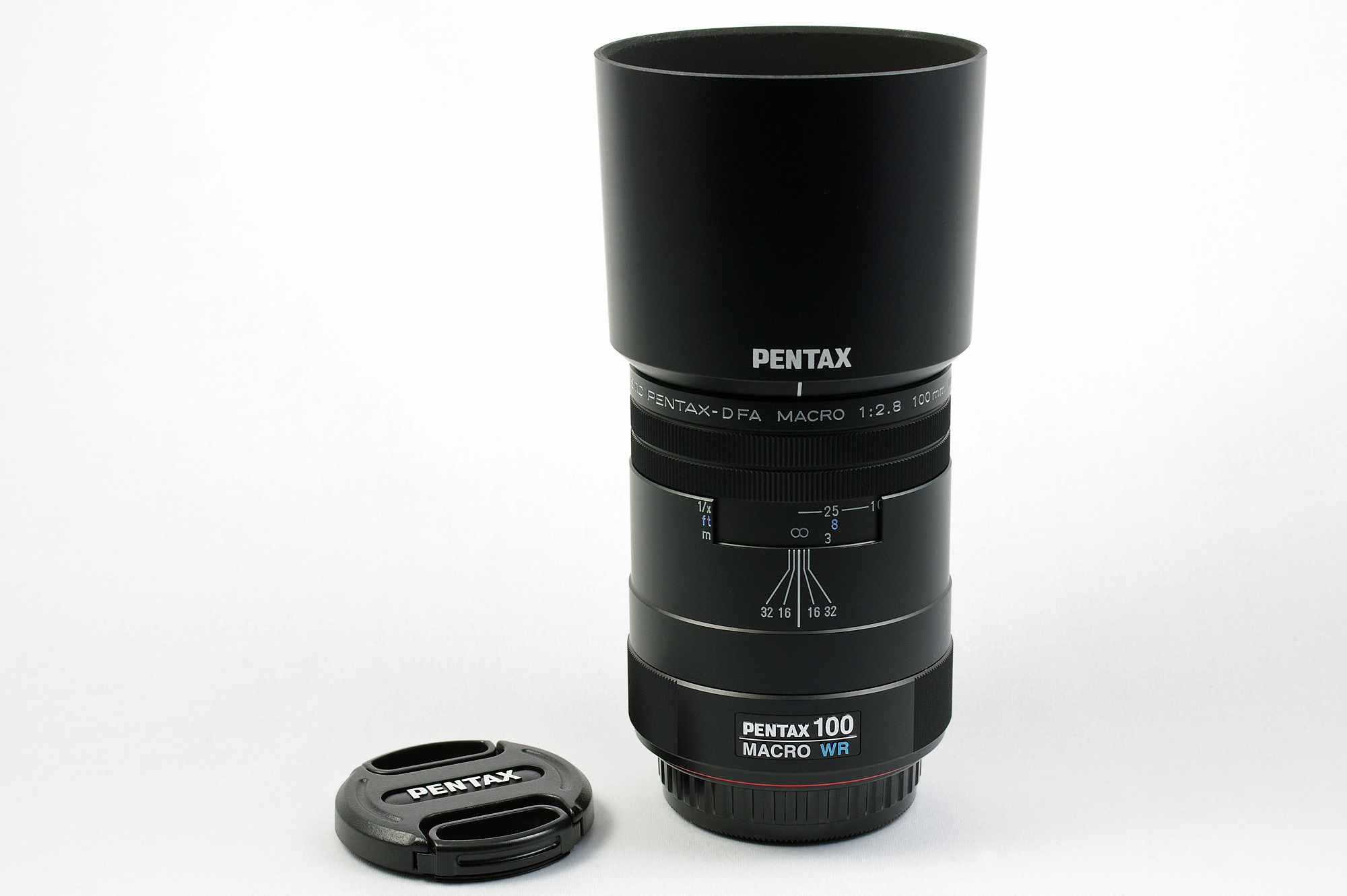
smc Pentax-D FA 100mm F2.8 Macro WR

These lenses use coatings that are more suitable for digital cameras. However, they also support older 35mm camera formats, as they provide full frame coverage. The series originally consisted only of two macro lenses – a 50mm and a 100mm – which both featured an aperture ring. In 2009 the 100mm was replaced by a weather resistant (WR) version without an aperture ring, that was co-developed with Tokina. The series was revived in February 2015 when the D FA* 70-200mm f2.8 and D FA 150-450mm f4.5-5.6 telephoto zoom lenses were announced along with first pictures of a (then unnamed) K-1 mock-up.

=== DA lenses ===
The DA lenses were designed specifically for the Pentax digital cameras incorporating an APS-C digital sensor. As the APS-C sensor has a smaller surface area than 35mm film, these lenses are not generally considered to be compatible with older cameras. They also lack an aperture ring, limiting their use on cameras that do not support automatic aperture settings. Most of the DA zoom lenses are available in weather resistant (WR) versions to match the weather sealed capabilities of the medium to upper level Pentax DSLR camera bodies. While older models still have the in-body screw drive autofocus system, newer designs marked "DC", "SDM" or "PLM" feature silent, in-lens autofocus motors.

Some lenses of this product line such as the DA 10-17 Fisheye were co-developed with Tokina.

==== DA-L lenses ====
These are lighter and cheaper versions of DA series zoom lenses. They have a plastic (as opposed to steel) mount and lack the quick-shift focusing system of their heavier siblings. They are only sold in kits with entry-level bodies.

==== DA* lenses ====
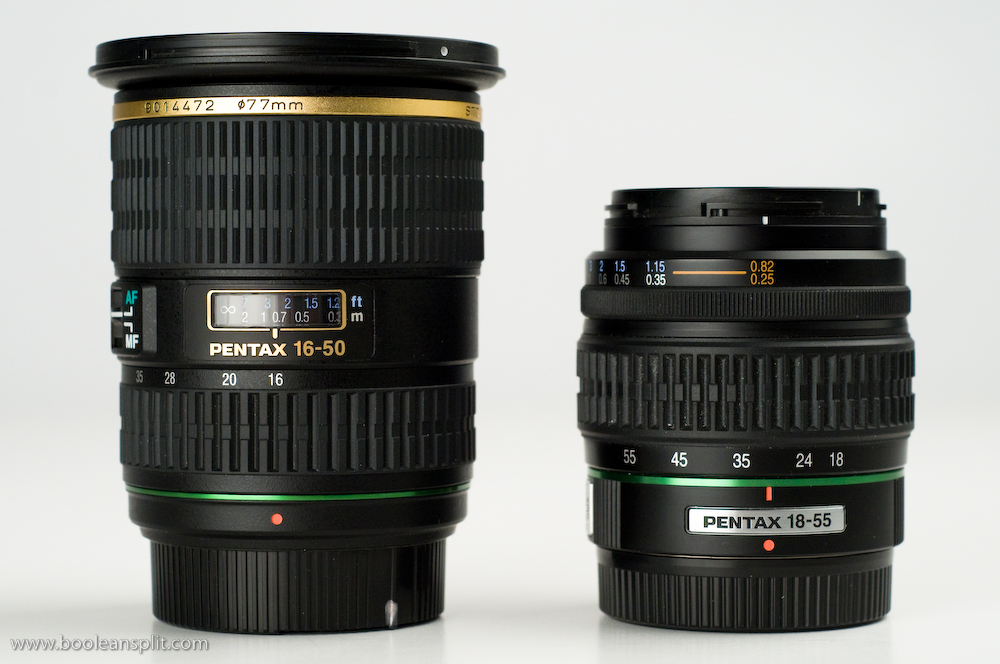
Pentax DA* 16-50mm f/2.8 (left) and Pentax DA 18-55mm f/3.5–5.6 (right)

The DA* lenses are designed for use with Pentax digital SLR cameras. DA* lenses have higher quality optics and feature a higher level of weather sealing (AW) than most DA lenses (WR). The DA* lenses are more expensive and generally feature improved light transmission and larger aperture openings for better low light performance. Some DA* lenses also feature both body driven screw drive focusing and the Pentax SDM (Supersonic Drive Motor) lens based focus mechanism.

Some lenses of this product line were co-developed with Tokina. Examples include the DA* 16-50 and DA* 50–135.

==== DA Limited lenses ====
These are high quality (mostly prime) lenses with the lens housing made of metal. They usually have a wider maximum aperture compared to zooms but narrower as compared to other prime lenses. This is a compromise as DA Limited lenses are usually made to be much more compact than other primes lenses. In August 2013 the DA Limited lenses were upgraded with Pentax new HD coating, replacing the previous smc coating. The new HD lenses are also available in both silver and black, as opposed to only black.

The DA 35/2.8 Macro was co-developed with Tokina. As of February 2015, the DA 20-40mm F2.8-4 Limited DC WR announced in November 2013 stands out for being both the only zoom as well as the only weather resistant lens of the series.

=== Compatibility ===
All Pentax K-mount auto-focus cameras are backward compatible with K-mount lenses dating back as far as 1975 without need for an adapter. Cameras with a "crippled K-Mount" cannot read the set f-stop of K and M series lenses and must stop-down momentarily to meter in case the adjusted aperture is a stopped down one. All Pentax and Samsung D-Xenogon lenses are interchangeable since Samsung adopted K-mount on their GX camera bodies. The Samsung GX-10 and GX-20 are the only two Samsung models compatible with SDM lenses. Pentax KAF3 lenses do only have an own internal autofocus motor and are not fully compatible with some early DSLR models like the *istD.

Pentax K-mount lens function compatibility
Lens bayonet >	K, M	A	F, FA, D-FA	FA Powerzoom	FA-J	DA, DA-L	DA-SDM, DA-DCM (K_{AF3})	DA, D-FA (K_{AF4})
Main changes: Camera	First K-mount version	A-position, electrical contacts	Screw drive, with contacts for serial communication	Two contacts for Powerzoom	Aperture ring abandoned	Small image circle	In lens autofocus motor	electromagnetic aperture control
K (K-series, M-series, LX)	M, Av	M, Av	M, Av	M, Av	X	X	X	X
K_{A} (A-series, P-series)	M, Av	M, Av, Tv, P	M, Av, Tv, P	M, Av, Tv, P	Tv, P	(Tv, P)^{1}	(Tv, P)^{1}	X
K_{AF}	M, Av	M, Av, Tv, P	M, Av, Tv, P, AF	M, Av, Tv, P, AF	Tv, P, AF	(Tv, P)^{1}	(Tv, P)^{1}	X
K_{AF2} (MZ-S, MZ-3, MZ-5 etc.)	M, Av	M, Av, Tv, P	M, Av, Tv, P, AF	M, Av, Tv, P, AF, PZ	Tv, P, AF	(Tv, P)^{1}	(Tv, P)^{1}	X
K_{A2} (MZ-M/ZX-M)	M, Av	M, Av, Tv, P	M, Av, Tv, P	M, Av, Tv, P	Tv, P	(Tv, P)^{1}	(Tv, P)^{1}	X
K_{AF} without aperture simulator (MZ-50, MZ-30, *ist)	M	M, Av, Tv, P	M, Av, Tv, P, AF	M, Av, Tv, P, AF	M, Av, Tv, P, AF	(M, Av, Tv, P, AF)^{1}	(M, Av, Tv, P)^{1}	X
K_{AF} digital without aperture simulator (*istD, *istDS, *istDL, K100D, K110D)	M+, Av0	M, Av, Tv, P	M, Av, Tv, P, AF	M, Av, Tv, P, AF	M, Av, Tv, P, AF	M, Av, Tv, P, AF	M, Av, Tv, P	X
K_{AF2} digital Powerzoom without aperture simulator (K10D)	M+, Av0	M, Av, Tv, P	M, Av, Tv, P, AF	M, Av, Tv, P, AF, PZ ^{2}	M, Av, Tv, P, AF	M, Av, Tv, P, AF	M, Av, Tv, P, SDM/DCM ^{2}	X
K_{AF2} digital SDM without aperture simulator (K100D Super, K20D, K200D, K-m, K-7, K-5, K-5 II, K-x, K-01)	M+, Av0	M, Av, Tv, P	M, Av, Tv, P, AF	M, Av, Tv, P, AF	M, Av, Tv, P, AF	M, Av, Tv, P, AF	M, Av, Tv, P, SDM/DCM	X
K_{AF2} digital SDM without aperture simulator and with ED-interface: K-70. After update of firmware: K-50, K-1, K-3, K-3 II, K-3 III, K-S1, K-S2.	M+, Av0	M, Av, Tv, P	M, Av, Tv, P, AF	M, Av, Tv, P, AF	M, Av, Tv, P, AF	M, Av, Tv, P, AF	M, Av, Tv, P, SDM/DCM	M, Av, Tv, P, SDM/DCM/PLM

Legend:

- ^{1} – Image circle not sufficient or borders with vignetting or optical aberrations
- ^{2} – K10D can be updated to change from Powerzoom-use to SDM-drive.
- AF – Screw drive autofocus
- Av – Aperture priority
- Av0 – Aperture priority only with open aperture
- DCM – Autofocus with direct current motor (K10D with firmware version 1.3)
- M – manual exposure with exposure display
- M+ – manual exposure with automatic working aperture metering, no exposure display
- P – Program AE
- PLM - Autofocus with pulse motor
- PZ – Powerzoom (K10D with limited capatibility only)
- SDM – Autofocus with supersonic motor (K10D with firmware version 1.3)
- Tv – Time priority
- X – not useful, because smallest aperture always set

Comments:

- On cameras with K_{AF}/K_{AF2}-mount without aperture simulator during Av metering the aperture has to be adjusted on the camera.

== Pentax 6×7 lenses ==
Takumar and Pentax lenses (6×7 / 67)
FL (mm)	Name	Ap.	Angle	Const.	Min. focus	Filt. (mm)	Φ×L	Wgt.	Notes
Fisheye lenses
35	SMC Fish-Eye-Takumar	f/4.5–22	180°	11e/7g	0.45 m (1 ft 6 in)	—N/a (built-in)	102×73 mm (4.0×2.9 in)	920 g (32 oz)	
Wide angle lenses
45	SMC Pentax	f/4–22	88°	9e/8g	0.37 m (1 ft 3 in)	82	91.5×57.5 mm (3.60×2.26 in)	485 g (17.1 oz)	
55	SMC Pentax	f/4–22	77°	9e/8g	0.40 m (1 ft 4 in)	77	91.5×75.5 mm (3.60×2.97 in)	615 g (21.7 oz)	
75	SMC Takumar	f/4.5–22	61°	5e/4g	0.70 m (2 ft 4 in)	82	91.5×81 mm (3.60×3.19 in)	700 g (25 oz)	
Normal lenses
90	SMC Takumar	f/2.8–22	53°	6e/5g	0.85 m (2 ft 9 in)	67	91.5×63 mm (3.60×2.48 in)	610 g (22 oz)	Includes leaf shutter
90	SMC Pentax	f/2.8–22	52°	7e/5g	0.65 m (2 ft 2 in)	67	91.5×57.5 mm (3.60×2.26 in)	485 g (17.1 oz)	
105	SMC Takumar	f/2.4–22	45°	6e/5g	1.00 m (3 ft 3 in)	67	91.5×60 mm (3.60×2.36 in)	628 g (22.2 oz)	
Portrait lenses
165	SMC Pentax	f/2.8–22	30°	6e/5g	1.60 m (5 ft 3 in)	67	91.5×98.5 mm (3.60×3.88 in)	835 g (29.5 oz)	
200	SMC Takumar	f/4–22	26°	4e/4g	2.50 m (8 ft 2 in)	67	91.5×120 mm (3.60×4.72 in)	900 g (32 oz)	
Telephoto lenses
300	SMC Takumar	f/4–45	17°	5e/5g	5.00 m (16.40 ft)	82	93×186 mm (3.7×7.3 in)	1,425 g (3.142 lb)	
400	SMC Takumar	f/4–45	12°	5e/5g	8.00 m (26.25 ft)	77	115×287 mm (4.5×11.3 in)	2,570 g (5.67 lb)	
500	SMC Pentax	f/5.6–45	10°	4e/4g	8.00 m (26.25 ft)	95	106.5×398 mm (4.19×15.67 in)	3,200 g (7.1 lb)	
600	SMC Takumar	f/4–45	8°	6e/5g	12.00 m (39.37 ft)	77	170×370 mm (6.7×14.6 in)	6,000 g (13 lb)	
800	SMC Takumar	f/4–45	6°	6e/6g	20.00 m (65.62 ft)	77	236×611 mm (9.3×24.1 in)	17,700 g (39.0 lb)	
800	SMC Pentax-M* ED(IF)	f/6.7–45	6°	9e/8g	8.00 m (26.25 ft)	67	150×570 mm (5.9×22.4 in)	6,000 g (13 lb)	
1000	SMC Reflex-Takumar	f/8	5°	6e/4g	35.00 m (114.83 ft)	—N/a (built-in)	180×352 mm (7.1×13.9 in)	6,660 g (14.68 lb)	
Special lenses
75	SMC Pentax Shift	f/4.5–32	61°	5e/3g	0.70 m (2 ft 4 in)	82	97×106.5 mm (3.82×4.19 in)	950 g (34 oz)	
135	SMC Macro-Takumar	f/4–32	36°	5e/3g	0.75 m (2 ft 6 in)	67	91.5×95 mm (3.60×3.74 in)	645 g (22.8 oz)	

== Pentax 645 lenses ==
Pentax lenses (645)
FL (mm)	Name	Ap.	Angle	Const.	Min. focus	Filt. (mm)	Φ×L	Wgt.	Notes
Ultra wide angle lenses
25	Pentax-DA 645 AL[IF] SDM AW	f/4–32	95° (Note: With Pentax 645Z sensor, 43.8×32.8 mm (1.72×1.29 in), which has a crop factor of 1.3× compared to a standard 645 frame of 57×44 mm (2 1/4×1 3/4 in).)	12e/8g	0.4 m (1 ft 4 in)	—N/a	90×148.5 mm (3.54×5.85 in)	1,040 g (2.29 lb)	
33~55	SMC Pentax-FA 645 AL	f/4.5–22	93~65° / 80~53°	11e/8g	0.4 m (1 ft 4 in)	82	88×104 mm (3.5×4.1 in)	585 g (20.6 oz)	
35	SMC Pentax-A 645	f/3.5–22	90°	9e/8g	0.3 m (1 ft 0 in)	77	80×67 mm (3.1×2.6 in)	470 g (17 oz)	
Wide angle lenses
35	SMC Pentax-FA 645 AL[IF]	f/3.5–32	76°	10e/7g	0.3 m (1 ft 0 in)	82	88×90 mm (3.5×3.5 in)	560 g (20 oz)	
45	SMC Pentax-A 645	f/2.8–22	76°	9e/8g	0.45 m (1 ft 6 in)	67	74×66.5 mm (2.91×2.62 in)	400 g (14 oz)	
45	SMC Pentax-FA 645	f/2.8–22	76° / 63°	9e/8g	0.45 m (1 ft 6 in)	67	76.5×66.5 mm (3.01×2.62 in)	475 g (16.8 oz)	
45~85	SMC Pentax-FA 645	f/4.5–32	76~44.5° / 63~36°	11e/9g	0.5 m (1 ft 8 in)	77	85×99.5 mm (3.35×3.92 in)	815 g (28.7 oz)	
55	SMC Pentax-A 645	f/2.8–22	65°	8e/7g	0.45 m (1 ft 6 in)	58	74×60.5 mm (2.91×2.38 in)	410 g (14 oz)	
Normal lenses
55	Pentax-D FA 645 AL[IF] SDM AW	f/2.8–22	53°	9e/7g	0.5 m (1 ft 8 in)	67	81.3×68.2 mm (3.20×2.69 in)	416 g (14.7 oz)	
55~110	SMC Pentax-FA 645	f/5.6–45	53~28°	0e/9g	0.8 m (2 ft 7 in)	82	88×104 mm (3.5×4.1 in)	500 g (18 oz)	
75	SMC Pentax 645 LS	f/2.8–22	50°	6e/5g	0.75 m (2 ft 6 in)	58	76×49.5 mm (2.99×1.95 in)	365 g (12.9 oz)	Includes leaf shutter
75	SMC Pentax-A 645	f/2.8–22	50°	6e/5g	0.6 m (2 ft 0 in)	58	74×37.5 mm (2.91×1.48 in)	240 g (8.5 oz)	
75	SMC Pentax-FA 645	f/2.8–22	50° / 40.5°	6e/5g	0.6 m (2 ft 0 in)	58	74.5×37.5 mm (2.93×1.48 in)	215 g (7.6 oz)	
80~160	SMC Pentax-A 645 Zoom	f/4.5–32	47~24.5°	11e/11g	1.0 m (3 ft 3 in)	77	82.5×131 mm (3.25×5.16 in)	1,020 g (2.25 lb)	
80~160	SMC Pentax-FA 645	f/4.5–32	47~24.5° / 38~19.5°	11e/10g	1.0 m (3 ft 3 in)	77	85×130.5 mm (3.35×5.14 in)	1,010 g (2.23 lb)	
Portrait lenses
135	SMC Pentax 645 LS	f/4–32	29°	5e/5g	1.25 m (4 ft 1 in)	58	76×69 mm (3.0×2.7 in)	465 g (16.4 oz)	Includes leaf shutter
150	SMC Pentax-A 645	f/3.5–32	26°	4e/4g	1.4 m (4 ft 7 in)	58	74×71.5 mm (2.91×2.81 in)	440 g (16 oz)	
150	SMC Pentax-FA 645 [IF]	f/2.8–32	21°	7e/7g	1.2 m (3 ft 11 in)	67	74.5×96 mm (2.93×3.78 in)	500 g (18 oz)	
150~300	SMC Pentax-FA 645 ED[IF]	f/5.6–45	21~10.5°	15e/13g	2.0 m (6 ft 7 in)	67	80×201 mm (3.1×7.9 in)	920 g (32 oz)	
200	SMC Pentax-A 645	f/5.6–32	20°	4e/4g	2.0 m (6 ft 7 in)	58	74×127 mm (2.9×5.0 in)	570 g (20 oz)	
Telephoto lenses
200	SMC Pentax-FA 645 [IF]	f/4–32	20° / 15.5°	6e/5g	1.5 m (4 ft 11 in)	58	74.5×119 mm (2.93×4.69 in)	625 g (22.0 oz)	
300	SMC Pentax-A 645 ED(IF)	f/4–32	13.5°	8e/8g	3.0 m (9.8 ft)	77	93×208 mm (3.7×8.2 in)	1,360 g (3.00 lb)	
300	SMC Pentax-FA* 645 ED(IF)	f/4–32	13.5° / 10.5°	8e/8g	3.0 m (9.8 ft)	77	83×207.5 mm (3.27×8.17 in)	1,490 g (3.28 lb)	
400	SMC Pentax-FA 645 ED(IF)	f/5.6–32	10° / 7.9°	7e/6g	3.0 m (9.8 ft)	77	83×252 mm (3.3×9.9 in)	1,260 g (2.78 lb)	
Special lenses
90	SMC Pentax-D FA 645 Macro ED AW SR	f/2.8–22	34°	11e/9g	0.413 m (1 ft 4.3 in)	67	90.5×111.6 mm (3.56×4.39 in)	1,040 g (2.29 lb)	
120	SMC Pentax-FA 645 Macro	f/4–32	32° / 26°	11e/9g	0.395 m (1 ft 3.6 in)	67	82.5×110 mm (3.25×4.33 in)	735 g (25.9 oz)	

== Pentax 110 lenses ==
Pentax-110 lenses (for auto 110)
FL (mm)	Name	Ap.	Angle	Const.	Min. focus	Filt. (mm)	Φ×L	Wgt.	Notes
Wide angle lenses
18	Pentax-110	f/2.8–18	61.5°	6e/6g	0.25 m (9.8 in)	30.5	34×21 mm (1.34×0.83 in)	28 g (0.99 oz)	
18	Pentax-110 Pan Focus	f/2.8–18	61.5°	6e/6g	(fixed)	30.5	34×21 mm (1.34×0.83 in)	29 g (1.0 oz)	
Normal lenses
20–40	Pentax-110	f/2.8–18	57.5–31°	8e/8g	0.7 m (2 ft 4 in)	49	54×65.4 mm (2.13×2.57 in)	160 g (5.6 oz)	
24	Pentax-110	f/2.8–18	47°	6e/5g	0.35 m (1 ft 2 in)	25.5	29.6×12.8 mm (1.17×0.50 in)	13 g (0.46 oz)	
Portrait lenses
50	Pentax-110	f/2.8–18	24°	5e/5g	0.9 m (2 ft 11 in)	37.5	43×27.2 mm (1.69×1.07 in)	53 g (1.9 oz)	
70	Pentax-110	f/2.8–18	17.2°	6e/5g	1.5 m (4 ft 11 in)	49	51×50.5 mm (2.01×1.99 in)	53 g (1.9 oz)	

== Q-mount lenses ==
Pentax Q-mount lenses
FL (mm)	Name	Ap.	Angle	Const.	Min. focus	Filt. (mm)	Φ×L	Wgt.	Notes
Fisheye lenses
3.2	03 FISH-EYE	f/5.6	173°	6e/5g	0.09 m (3.5 in)	—N/a	40.6×30.5 mm (1.60×1.20 in)	29 g (1.0 oz)	
Ultra wide angle lenses
3.8–5.9	08 WIDE ZOOM	f/3.7–4	102–77°	10e/8g	0.25 m (9.8 in)	49	54×38 mm (2.1×1.5 in)	75 g (2.6 oz)	
Wide angle lenses
6.3	04 TOY LENS WIDE	f/7.1	67°	4e/3g	0.07 m (2.8 in)	—N/a	40.6×25.0 mm (1.60×0.98 in)	21 g (0.74 oz)	Intentionally undercorrected spherical aberration for soft focus effect
Normal lenses
5–15	02 STANDARD ZOOM	f/2.8–4.5	87–35°	8e/7g	0.3 m (12 in)	40.5	48.5×48 mm (1.91×1.89 in)	96 g (3.4 oz)	
8.5	01 STANDARD PRIME	f/1.9	58°	8e/5g	0.2 m (7.9 in)	40.5	45.5×23 mm (1.79×0.91 in)	37 g (1.3 oz)	
11.5	07 MOUNT SHIELD LENS	f/9	44.5°	1e/1g	0.3 m (12 in)	—N/a	40.8×6.9 mm (1.61×0.27 in)	8 g (0.28 oz)	
Portrait lenses
18	05 TOY LENS TELEPHOTO	f/8	26°	3e/3g	0.27 m (11 in)	—N/a	40.6×19.5 mm (1.60×0.77 in)	18 g (0.63 oz)	Intentionally undercorrected spherical aberration for soft focus effect
Telephoto lenses
15–45	06 TELEPHOTO ZOOM	f/2.8	35–12°	14e/10g	1.0 m (39 in)	40.5	50×56 mm (2.0×2.2 in)	90 g (3.2 oz)	

== See also ==
Jun Hirakawa

== Notes ==
Kind	Type	Focal length	Aperture	87	88	89	1990	91	92	93	94	95	96	97	98	99	2000	01	02	03	04	05	06	07	08	09	2010	11	12	13	14	15	16	17	18	19	2020	21	22	23	24	25
Prime	UWA	14	2.8																		DA 14mm f/2.8 ED AL																					
Prime	UWA	15	4.0																							DA 15mm f/4 Limited				HD DA 15mm f/4 ED AL Limited												
Prime	UWA	20	2.8									FA 20mm f/2.8 AL																														
Prime	UWA	21	2.4																																			HD D FA 21mm Limited DC				
Prime	UWA	21	3.2																				DA 21mm f/3.2 AL Limited								HD DA 21mm f/3.2 AL Limited											
Prime	WA	24	2.0					FA* 24mm f/2 AL																																		
Prime	WA	31	1.8															FA 31mm f/1.8 Limited																				HD FA 31mm 1.8 Limited				
Prime	WA	35	2.0													FA 35mm f/2 AL																				HD FA 35mm f/2 WR						
Prime	WA	35	2.4																								DA 35mm f/2.4 AL															
Prime	WA	35	2.8																							DA 35mm f/2.8 Limited Macro					HD DA 35mm f/2.8 Limited Macro											
Prime	normal	40	2.8																		DA 40mm f/2.8 Limited									HD DA 40mm f/2.8 Limited												
Prime	normal	40	2.8																										DA 40mm f/2.8 XS													
Prime	normal	43	1.9											FA 43mm f/1.9 Limited																								HD FA 43mm 1.9 Limited				
Prime	normal	50	1.4	F 50mm f/1.4				FA 50mm f/1.4																																Classic		
Prime	normal	50	1.4																																					HD FA		
Prime	normal	50	1.4																																HD FA* 50 f/1.4 SDM AW							
Prime	normal	50	1.8																										DA 50mm f/1.8 AL													
Prime	normal	50	2.8		F 50 Macro		FA 50mm f/2.8 Macro															D FA 50mm f/2.8 Macro																				
Prime	normal	55	1.4																						DA* 55mm f/1.4 SDM																	
Prime	Short Tele	70	2.4																				DA 70mm f/2.4 Limited								HD DA 70mm f/2.4 Limited											
Prime	Short Tele	77	1.8													FA 77mm f/1.8 Limited																						HD FA 77mm 1.8 Limited				
Prime	Short Tele	85	1.4						FA* 85mm f/1.4																													HD D FA* 85mm 1.4 SDM AW				
Prime	Tele	100	2.8	F 100mm f/2.8 Macro				FA 100mm f/2.8 Macro													D FA 100mm f/2.8 Macro					D FA 2.8 Macro Macro WR														HD D FA AW		
Prime	Tele	135	2.8	F 135mm 2.8					FA 135mm 2.8																																	
Prime	Tele	200	2.8							FA* 200mm f/2.8 ED															DA* 200mm f/2.8 SDM																	
Prime	4.0	200														FA* 200mm f/4 Macro ED																										
Prime	Super tele	300	2.8								FA* 300mm f/2.8 ED																															
Prime	Super tele	300	4.x	F* 300mm f/4.5 ED				FA* 300mm f/4.5 ED																	DA* 300mm f/4 SDM																	
Prime	Super tele	400	5.6											FA* 400mm f/5.6 ED																												
Prime	Ultra tele	560	5.6																										HD DA 560mm f/5.6 ED AW													
Prime	Ultra tele	600	4.0		F* 600mm f/4 ED			FA* 600mm f/4 ED																																		
Zoom	Fisheye		3.5-4.5									F 17-28mm f/3.5-4.5 Fish-Eye														DA 10-17mm f/3.5-4.5 Fish-Eye											HD DA 10-17mm 3.5-4.5 Fish-Eye					
Zoom	UWA	11-18	2.8																																	HD DA* 11-18 f/2.8 ED DC AW						
Zoom	UWA	12-24	4.0																			DA 12-24mm f/4 ED AL																				
Zoom	UWA	15-30	2.8																														D FA 15-30mm f/2.8 ED SDM WR									
Zoom	UWA	20-35	4.0												FA 20-40mm f/4 AL																											
Zoom	WA	16-45	4.0																	DA 16-45mm 4 ED AL																						
Zoom	WA	16-50	2.8																					DA* 16-50mm f/2.8 ED AL SDM														HD DA* 2.8 ED PLM AW				
Zoom	WA	16-85	3.5-5.6																												HD DA 16-85mm f/3.5-5.6 ED DC WR											
Zoom	WA	18-50	4-5.6																													HD DA 18-50 f/4-5.6 DC WR RE										
Zoom	WA	18-135	3.5-5.6																								DA 18-135mm f/3.5-5.6 ED AL DC WR															
Zoom	WA	20-40	2.8-4																												HD DA 20-40mm f/2.8-4 Limited DC WR											
Zoom	WA	24-50	4.0	F 24-50mm f/4																																						
Zoom	WA	24/28-70	2.8								FA* 28-70mm f/2.8 AL																						D FA 24-70mm f/2.8									
Zoom	Univ.	28-80	3.5-4.7					FA 28-80 f/3.5-4.7																																		
Zoom	Univ.	28-105	3.5/4-5.6						FA 28-105 f/4-5.6																									D FA 28-105 f/3.5-5.6 ED DC WR								
Zoom	Tele	50-135	2.8																					DA* 50-135mm f/2.8 ED SDM																		
Zoom	Tele	50-200	4-5.6																			DA 50-200mm f/4-5.6 ED				DA 50-200mm f/4-5.8 ED WR																
Zoom	Tele	55-300	4-5.8																						DA 55-300mm f/4-5.8 ED					DA 55-300mm f/4-5.8 ED WR												
Zoom	Tele	55-300	4.5-6.3																														HD DA 55-300mm f/4.5-6.3 ED PLM WR RE									
Zoom	Tele	60-250	4.0																						DA* 60-250mm f/4 ED SDM																	
Zoom	Tele	70/80-2x0	2.8								FA* 80-200mm f/2.8 ED																						HD D FA* 70-200mm f/2.8 ED DC AW									
Zoom	Tele	70/80-2x0	4.0																																		HD D FA 70-210 4 ED SDM WR					
Zoom	Tele	70/80-2x0	4-5.6	F 70-210mm f/4-5.6							FA 70-200mm f/4-5.6 ED																															
Zoom	Tele	100-300	4.5-5.6						FA 100-300mm f/4.5-5.6																																	
Zoom	Tele	150-450	4.5-5.6																														D FA 150-450mm f/4.5-5.6 ED DC AW									
Zoom	Tele	250-600	5.6		F* 250-600 ED			FA* 250-600 f/5.6 ED																																		
Teleconverter				F 1.7X AF																											HD DA 1.4X AW											
Kind	Type	Focal length	Aperture	87	88	89	1990	91	92	93	94	95	96	97	98	99	2000	01	02	03	04	05	06	07	08	09	2010	11	12	13	14	15	16	17	18	19	2020	21	22	23	24	25
