= Pentax D FA* 70-200mm lens =

HD Pentax-D FA* 70–200mm f/2.8 ED DC AW
- Maker: Pentax

Technical data
- Type: Zoom
- Focus drive: Brushless DC motor
- Focal length: 70–200mm
- Crop factor: 1.0
- Aperture (max/min): f/2.8 / f/22
- Close focus distance: 1.2 m (47 in)
- Max. magnification: 0.13x
- Diaphragm blades: 9, rounded
- Construction: 19 elements in 16 groups

Features
- Manual focus override: Yes Yes
- Weather-sealing: Yes Yes
- Unique features: Full weather sealing, improved full-time manual focus controls
- Application: Fast telephoto zoom

Physical
- Max. length: 203 mm (8.0 in)
- Diameter: 91.5 mm (3.60 in)
- Weight: 1,755 g (61.9 oz) without hood or tripod collar 1,835 g (64.7 oz) with hood 2,020 g (71.3 oz) with hood and tripod collar
- Filter diameter: 77mm

Accessories
- Lens hood: PH-RBM 77mm
- Case: HS110-230

Angle of view
- Horizontal: 16.5°–5.5° on 35mm 10.7°–3.6° on APS-C
- Diagonal: 34.5°–12.5° on 35mm 23°–8° on APS-C

History
- Introduction: 2015

Retail info
- MSRP: 1799.95 USD

The HD Pentax-D FA* 70–200mm f/2.8 ED DC AW lens is a professional telephoto zoom lens for the Pentax K-mount. Announced jointly with the HD PENTAX-D FA 150-450mm F4.5-5.6ED DC AW in February 2015, it is one a pair of full-frame lenses to reboot Pentax' involvement in that format, the last previously introduced full-frame lens being the D FA 100mm weather-sealed macro lens in 2009. On Pentax APS-C cameras, the D FA* 70–200mm has an equivalent focal length range of 107–307mm.

This lens represents several "firsts" for Pentax. It is the first Pentax lens to feature Super ED glass for improved chromatic aberration suppression and Aero Bright II nano-coating to minimize flare. The D FA* 70–200mm lens is also one of the first two Pentax lenses to feature an improved implementation of the Quick-Shift Focus System (full-time manual focus), with QFS/A and QFS/M positions on the autofocus switch. In QFS/A mode, the lens will not allow manual focus during autofocus operation until focusing is complete. In QFS/M mode, autofocus will stop and switch to manual focus immediately as soon as the focus ring is turned.

== See also ==
- Pentax (lens)
