= QF =

QF may stand for:

== Businesses and organisations ==
- Qantas, an Australian airline (IATA:QF)
- Qatar Foundation, a non-profit
- Quiverfull, a Christian movement

== Military ==
- Quds Force, an Iranian expeditionary unit
- Quick-firing gun, an artillery piece
- A gun breech that uses metallic cartridges; see British ordnance terms#QF
- Q-Fire, a decoy fire site used in World War II

== Other uses ==
- Quality factor, in physics and engineering, a measure of the "quality" of a resonant system
