= Pentax D FA 150-450mm lens =

HD PENTAX-D FA 150-450mm F4.5-5.6 ED DC AW
- Maker: Ricoh Imaging

Technical data
- Type: Zoom
- Focus drive: Brushless DC motor
- Focal length: 150–450mm
- Aperture (max/min): f/4.5–5.6
- Close focus distance: 2.0 m (6.6 ft)
- Max. magnification: 0.22×
- Diaphragm blades: 9, rounded
- Construction: 18 elements in 14 groups

Features
- Manual focus override: Yes Yes
- Weather-sealing: Yes Yes
- Application: Wildlife, sports

Physical
- Diameter: 95mm
- Weight: 2,325 g (82.0 oz) with hood and tripod collar 2,130 g (75 oz) with hood 2,000 g (71 oz) without hood or tripod collar
- Filter diameter: 86mm

Accessories
- Lens hood: PH-RBA86
- Case: HS120-270

History
- Introduction: 2015

Retail info
- MSRP: 2499.95 USD

The HD PENTAX-D FA 150-450mm F4.5-5.6 ED DC AW is a super-telezoom lens for Pentax K-mount. Optically, it features extra-low dispersion (ED) elements as well as HD, SP (Super Protect), and Bright Aero coatings. It is weather sealed and supports quick shifts.

== See also ==
- Pentax (lens)
