= Pentax D FA 100mm WR lens =

Pentax smc D-FA 100 mm F2.8 Macro WR
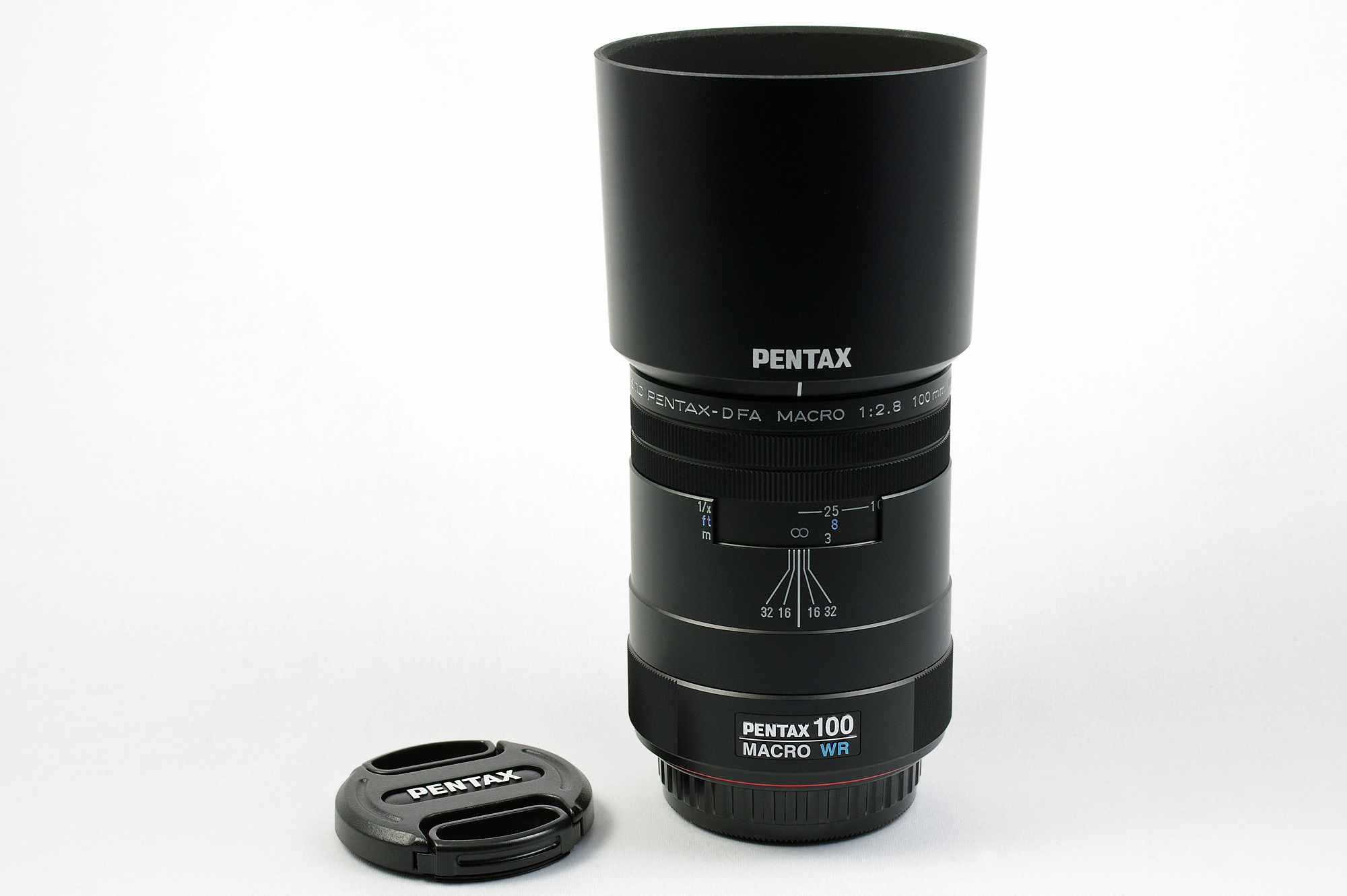
- Maker: Pentax
- Lens mount(s): Pentax K

Technical data
- Type: Prime
- Focus drive: Screwdrive
- Focal length: 100 mm
- Aperture (max/min): f/2.8
- Close focus distance: 0.30 metres (0.98 ft)
- Max. magnification: 1
- Diaphragm blades: 8
- Construction: 9 elements in 8 groups

Features
- Manual focus override: Yes Yes
- Weather-sealing: Yes Yes
- Lens-based stabilization: No No
- Aperture ring: No No

Physical
- Diameter: 65 millimetres (2.6 in)
- Weight: 340 grams (0.75 lb)
- Filter diameter: 49 mm

History
- Introduction: 2009

The Pentax smc D-FA 100 mm F2.8 Macro WR is a macro lens for K-mount announced by Pentax on December 9, 2009.

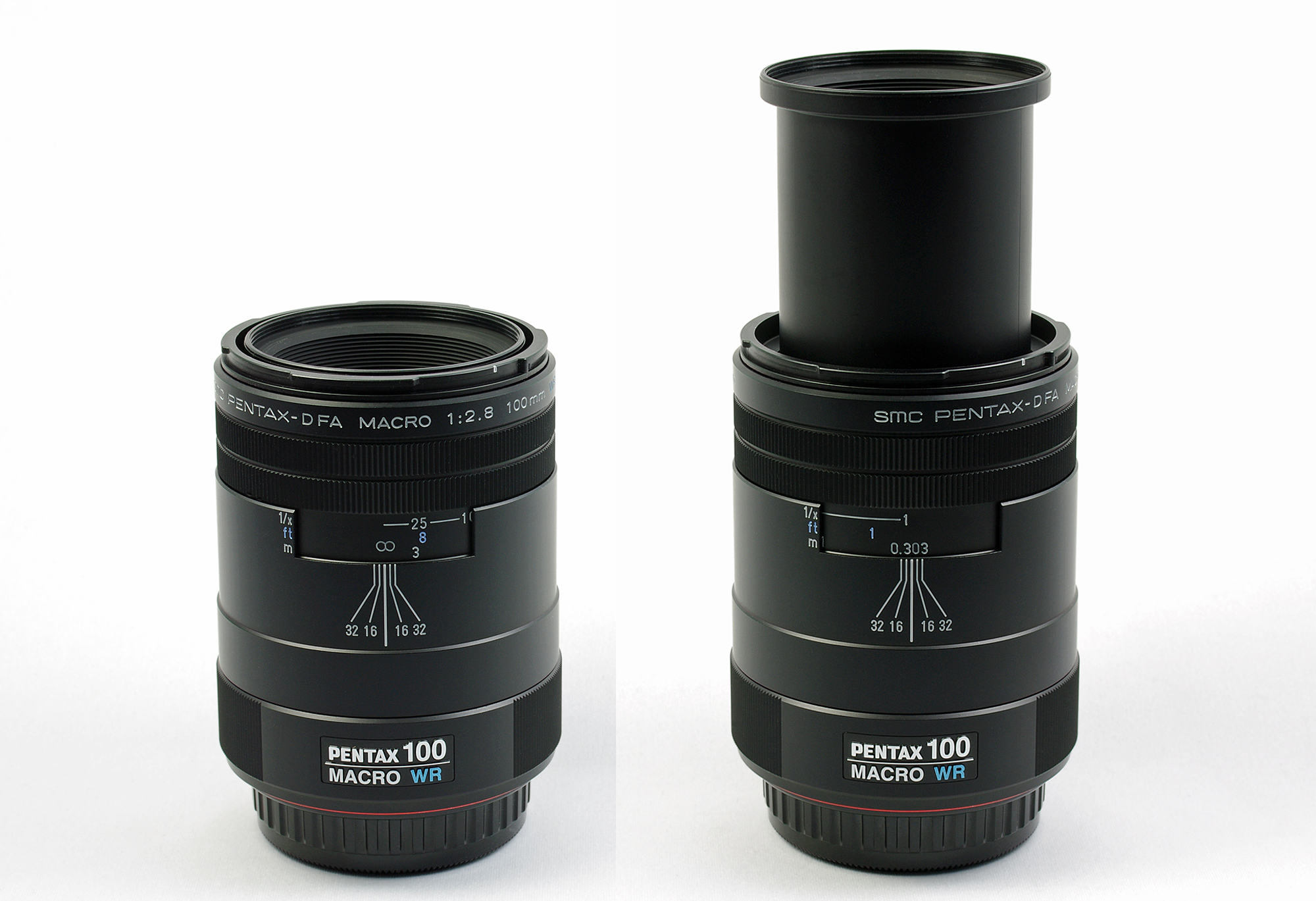
At infinity focus (left) and maximum close focus (right)
