= Pentax D FA* 50mm lens =

HD Pentax-D FA* 50mm f/1.4 SDM AW
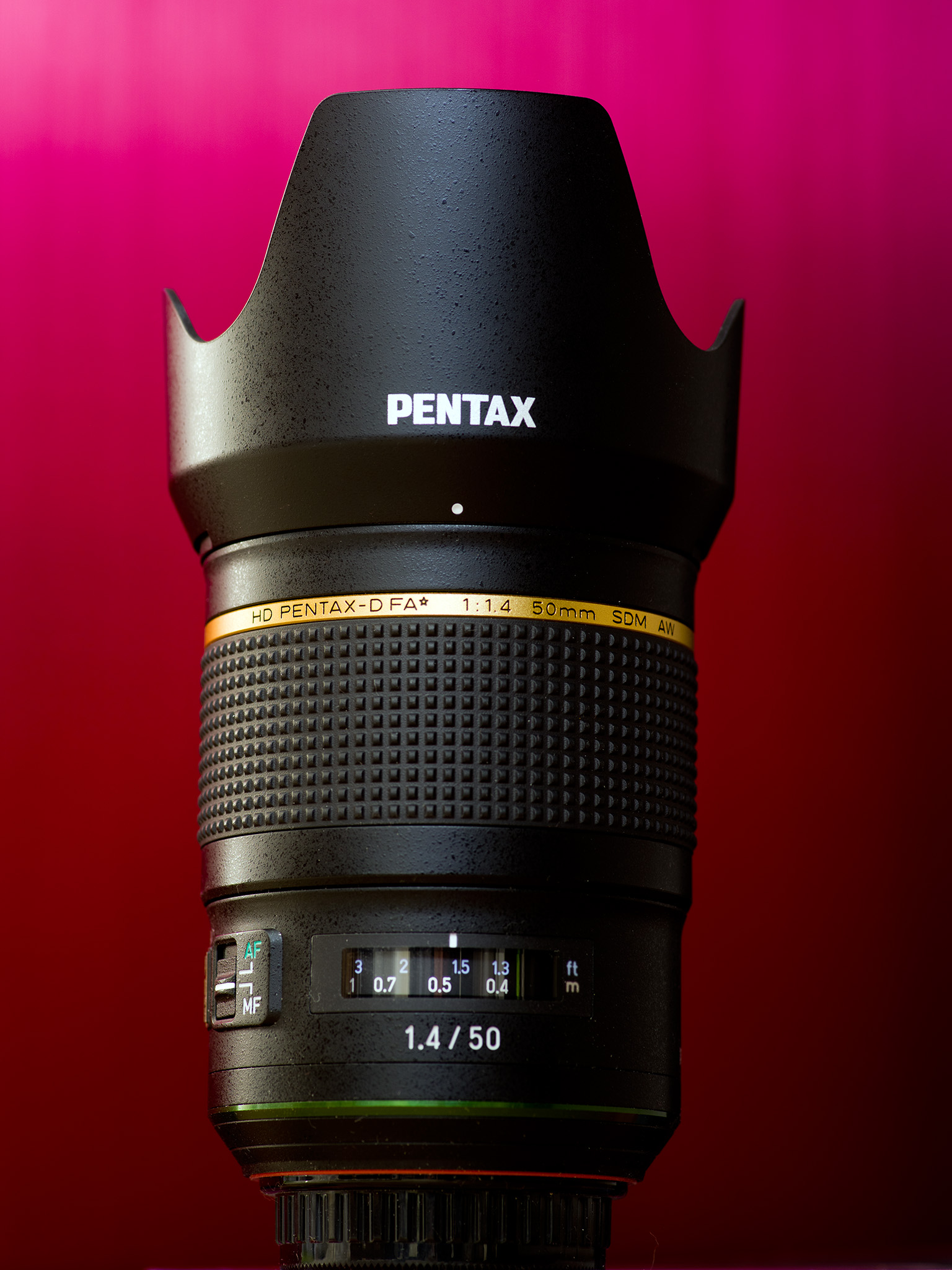
- Maker: Ricoh Imaging
- Lens mount: Pentax K_{AF4} (Note: Lenses with the K_{AF4} mount use electromagnetic diaphragms, omitting the mechanical aperture lever found on most Pentax lenses. Pentax DSLRs released before 2013, as well as the K-500, have not been updated to support K_{AF4} lenses and will always shoot with the aperture wide-open because they cannot control the diaphragm.)

Technical data
- Type: Prime
- Focus drive: Ring-type ultrasonic motor
- Focal length: 50mm
- Crop factor: 1.0
- Aperture (max/min): f/1.4 - f/16
- Close focus distance: 0.4 metres (1.3 ft)
- Max. magnification: 0.18×
- Diaphragm blades: 9, rounded from f/1.4 - 2.8
- Construction: 15 elements in 9 groups

Features
- Manual focus override: Yes Yes
- Weather-sealing: Yes Yes
- Macro capable: No No
- Application: Fast normal prime

Physical
- Max. length: 106 millimetres (4.2 in)
- Diameter: 80 millimetres (3.1 in)
- Weight: 910 grams (32.1 oz) without hood 955 grams (33.7 oz) with hood
- Filter diameter: 72mm

Accessories
- Lens hood: PH-RBB 72mm
- Case: S100-140

Angle of view
- Diagonal: 47° (full frame); 31.5° (APS-C)

History
- Introduction: July 2018

Retail info
- MSRP: 1,199.95 USD

The HD Pentax-D FA* 50mm f/1.4 SDM AW lens is a professional normal prime lens for the Pentax K-mount. It was officially announced on October 27, 2017, launched on June 28, 2018, and first shipped on July 26, 2018.

Its notable features include Pentax's first in-house ring-type ultrasonic motor for fast autofocus, full dust and water resistance, and an advanced optical formula for high-resolution images with smooth bokeh.

While this lens is developed and manufactured by Pentax, Tokina offers an optically identical lens as part of their "Opera" series for Canon EF and Nikon F mount.
