= Teranishi =

Teranishi (written: 寺西) is a Japanese surname. Notable people with the surname include:

- Nobukazu Teranishi (寺西 信一, born 1953), Japanese engineer
- Rolly Teranishi (born 1963), Japanese musician
- Teppei Teranishi (born 1980), American musician
