= Tompsett =

Tompsett is a surname. Notable people with the surname include:

- Michael Francis Tompsett (born 1939), British physicist, engineer, and inventor
- Oliver Tompsett (born 1981), English actor and singer
