= James Spilker =

US engineer, one of the originators of GPS

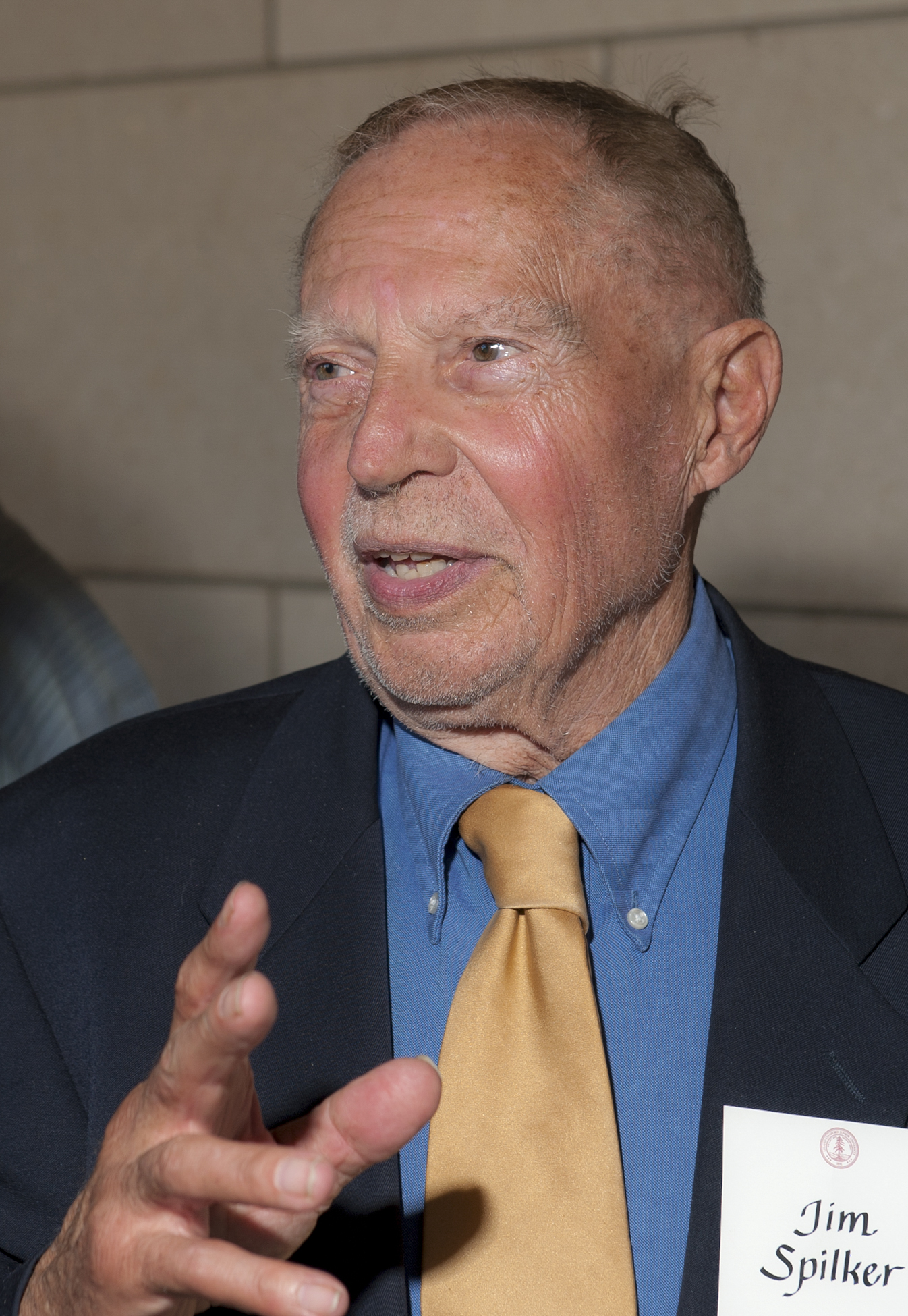
- Spilker in 2013
- Born: August 4, 1933
- Died: September 24, 2019 (aged 86)
- Occupations: Engineer, professor
- Known for: Principal architect of the Global Positioning System

James Julius Spilker Jr. (August 4, 1933 – September 24, 2019) was an American engineer and a consulting professor in the aeronautics and astronautics department at Stanford University. He was one of the principal architects of the Global Positioning System (GPS). He was the co-founder of the space communications company Stanford Telecommunications, and later was the executive chairman of AOSense Inc., Sunnyvale, CA.

== Education ==
Spilker had a difficult early childhood, battling illnesses and becoming legally blind in one eye when he was young. He was raised only by his mother.

After graduating high school and working for awhile, Spilker began attending college at the College of Marin, a community college in Kentfield, California, primarily for financial reasons. After receiving scholarship aid from Stanford University and Hewlett-Packard, he was able to transfer to Stanford, which he attended for 5 years and received a B.S. degree in 1955, an M.S. degree in 1956, and a Ph.D. in 1958, all in electrical engineering. He also completed the senior management program at UCLA in 1985.

== Career ==
From 1958 to 1963, Spilker worked as a research supervisor at Lockheed Research Labs in Palo Alto, California, where he invented an optimal tracking device for spread-spectrum signals and devised technology to communicate with aircraft flying to/from Berlin, Germany during the Russian blockade.

In 1963, he became manager of the communications sciences department of Ford Aerospace Corporation where he led and managed efforts on Ford Aerospace Corporation both satellite communications, ground terminals and military communications satellite payloads for the first quasi-stationary communications satellites, and developed multiple access technologies for various satellite communications and became Director of Communications Systems.

In 1973, he co-founded Stanford Telecommunications Inc. (referred to as Stanford Telecom) with Marshall Fitzgerald and John Brownie. Stanford Telecom was the first of his three Silicon Valley startup companies, with three people and no VC funding. As the company's Executive Chairman, he grew the military satellite communications and GPS company to over 1,300 employees in 5 states when he sold it in 1999.

During Spilker's leadership at Stanford Telecommunications Inc., he also designed semiconductor (ASICs) Application-specific integrated circuit for error correction, number-controlled oscillators, and quadrature amplitude modulation. Aviation Week and Space Technology in 1997 ranked Stanford Telecom as the #2 most competitive aerospace company in the world and top 100 fastest growing companies.

From 2001 until his death in 2019, Spilker was a consulting professor at Stanford University in the electrical engineering and aeronautics and astronautics department. In 2005, Spilker co-founded the Stanford University Research Center for Position, Navigation and Time, which continues today and has an annual international symposium at Stanford University with invited speakers from around the world.

In 2005, Spilker also co-founded AOSense Inc., an atomic physics company specializing in inertial navigation using cold atom interferometry. He was Executive Chairman at AOSense Inc.

He was also co-founder and chairman of Rosum, a high-tech company using digital and analog television signals for indoor positioning services and augmentation of GPS.

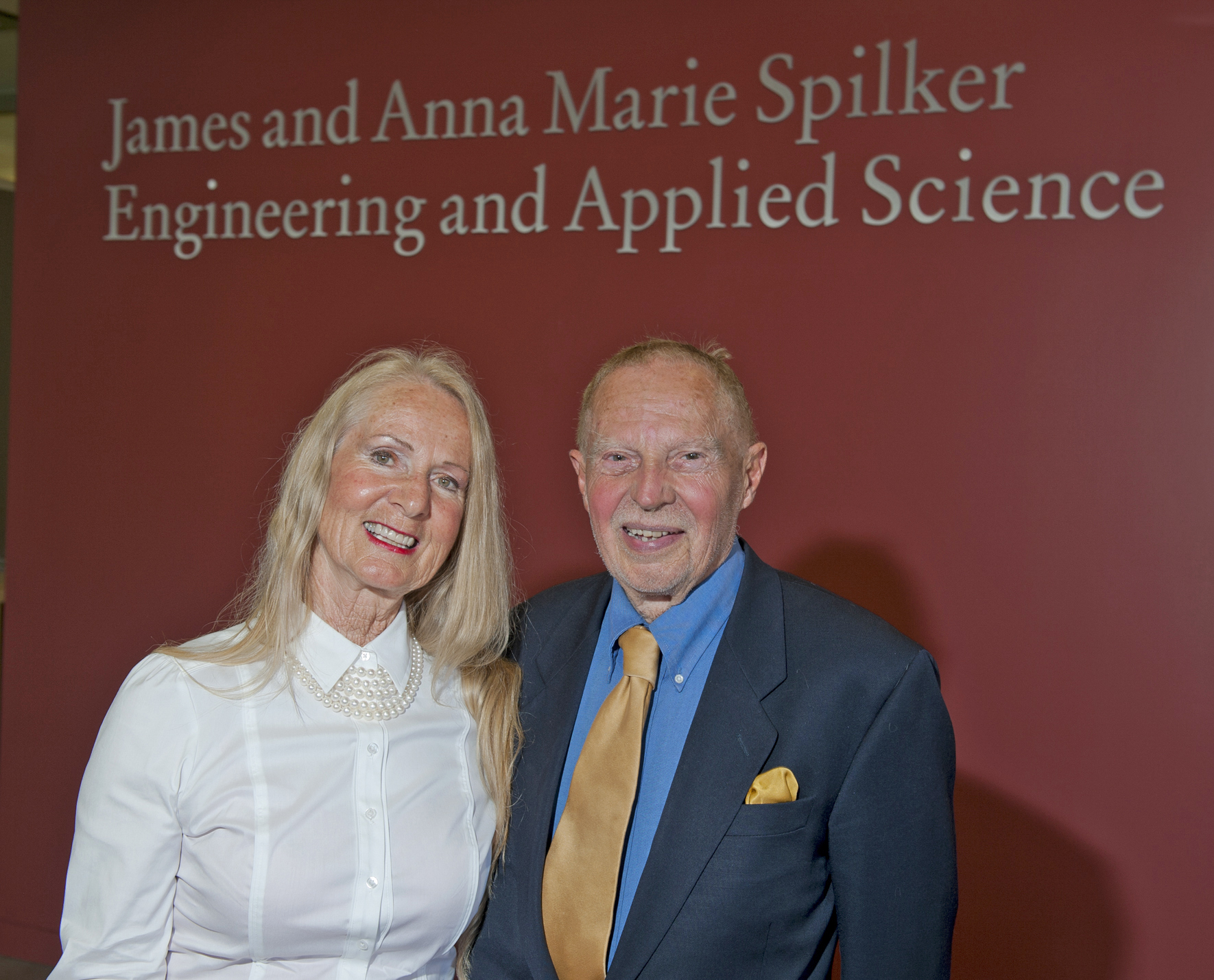
James and Anna Marie Spilker at the Stanford building dedication in 2013

Spilker was a member of the Stanford University Engineering advisory board, a member of the University of Southern California (USC) Communication Sciences Institute, a member of the US Defense Science Board GPS Task Force, and the Air Force Space Command GPS Independent Review Team. He was a member of the National Academy of Engineering (NAE) and a Life Fellow of the IEEE for the development of digital satellite communications and navigation systems.

== Publications ==
=== Books ===
1. Digital Communications by Satellite, Prentice-Hall, 1977. 10 printings including 1 paperback.
2. GPS Global Positioning System: Theory and Applications. AIAA, co-editor with Bradford Parkinson, 1996. Author and co-author of 9 chapters in the book. The book won the AIAA Sommerfield Best Book Medal.
3. Position, Navigation, and Timing Technologies in the 21st Century: Integrated Satellite Navigation, Sensor Systems, and Civil Applications. Wiley - IEEE Press, 2019. Editors: Y. Jade Morton, Frank van Diggelen, James Spilker, and Bradford Parkinson. Associate Editors: Sherman Lo, Grace Gao.

=== Major book chapter and technical papers ===
- Evolution of Modern Digital Communications Security Technologies, in Science, Technology, and National Security, coauthor with Jim Omura, Paul Baran, Pennsylvania Academy of Sciences, 2002.
- Spilker wrote over 100 technical papers for various IEEE and ION publications.

== Honors ==
James Spilker was an elected member of the National Academy of Engineering (1998) and was inducted to the Air Force GPS Hall of Fame (2000) and the Silicon Valley Engineering Hall of Fame (2007). He was a Life Fellow of the IEEE and a Fellow of the Institute of Navigation (ION). As one of the originators of GPS, James Spilker shared in the Goddard Memorial Trophy (2012).

He won the Arthur Young Entrepreneur of the Year Award in 1987, the ION Kepler Award (the highest award of the ION) in 1999, the Burka Award in 2002, and the US Air Force Space Command Recognition Award for 9 years of service on GPS Independent Review Team in 2000. In 2015, he received the IEEE Edison Medal for contributions to the technology and implementation of the GPS civilian navigation system. In 2019, James Spilker shared the 2019 Queen Elizabeth Prize for Engineering with three other GPS pioneers (Bradford Parkinson, Hugo FrueHauf, and Richard Schwartz).

In 2012, Spilker and his wife, Anna Marie Spilker, were recognized for their contributions by Stanford University, which dedicated the James and Anna Marie Spilker Engineering and Applied Sciences Building in their honor.

== Personal life ==
James Spilker was married to Anna Marie Spilker, a licensed real estate broker and the founder and president of New Pacific Investments Inc. in the Silicon Valley. He died on September 24, 2019, at the age of 86.
