= Bradford Parkinson =

American engineer

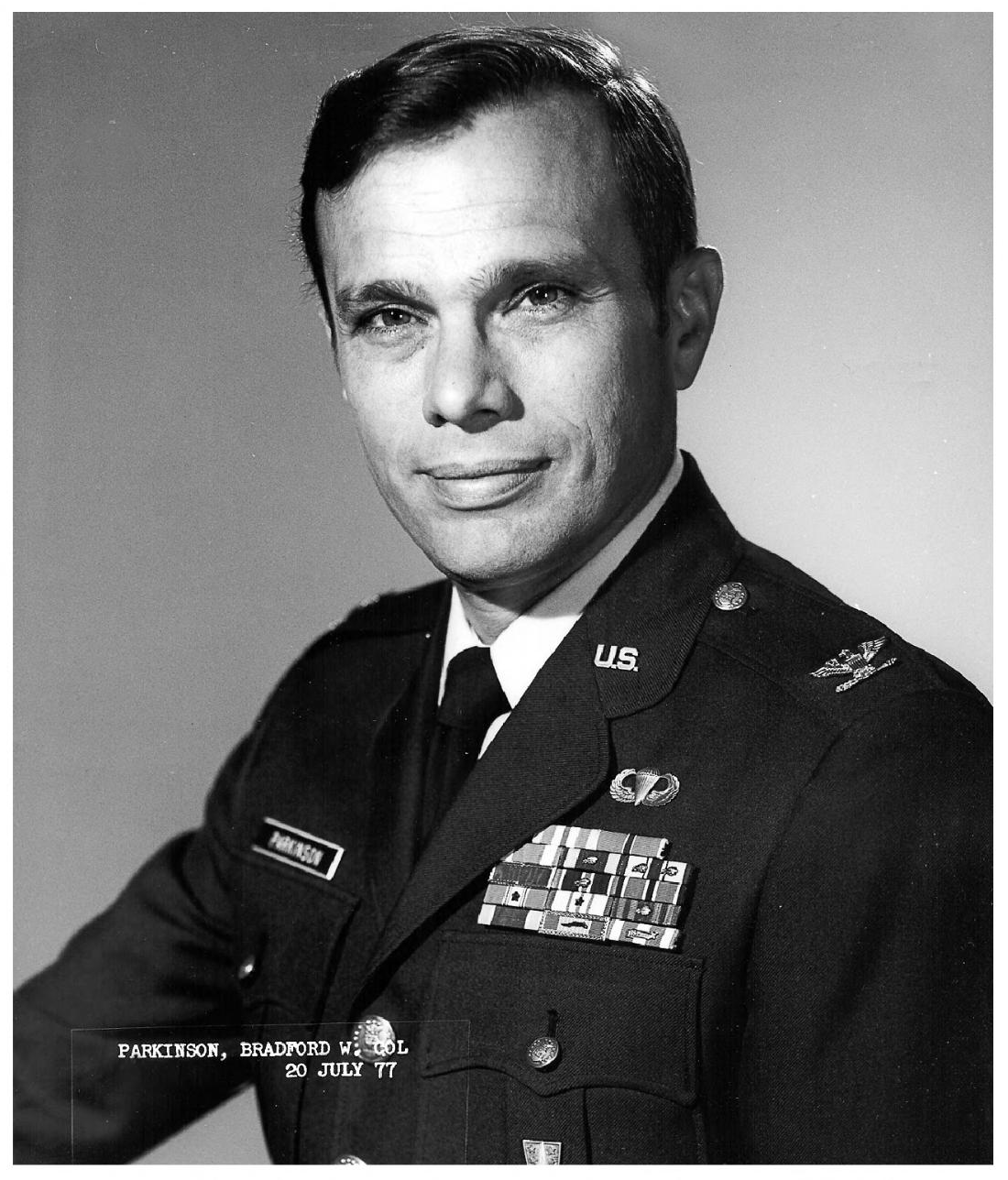
- Born: February 16, 1935 (age 91); Madison, Wisconsin, U.S.
- Education: United States Naval Academy; Massachusetts Institute of Technology; Stanford University
- Known for: Global positioning system
- Awards: Magellanic Premium (1997); Draper Prize; National Inventors Hall of Fame; Marconi Prize (2016); Queen Elizabeth Prize for Engineering (2019)
- Scientific career
- Fields: Aeronautics
- Workplaces: United States Air Force; Stanford University
- Doctoral students: Penina Axelrad

Bradford Parkinson (born February 16, 1935) is an American engineer and inventor, retired United States Air Force Colonel and Emeritus Professor at Stanford University. He is best known as the lead architect, advocate and developer, with early contributions from Ivan Getting and Roger Easton, of the Air Force NAVSTAR program, better known as Global Positioning System.

He was also the co-principal investigator (co-PI) and program manager on Gravity Probe B, which tested gravitomagnetism and was the first direct mechanical test of Einstein’s General Relativity.

He has received numerous awards and honors for GPS and contributions to engineering and invention, including the Charles Stark Draper Prize, National Inventors Hall of Fame, and IEEE Medal of Honor, among others. In 2019, Bradford Parkinson shared the Queen Elizabeth Prize for Engineering with three other GPS pioneers (James Spilker, Hugo FrueHauf, and Richard Schwartz).

== Education ==
For his secondary education, Parkinson attended the Breck School, then a small, all-boys preparatory school, graduating in 1952. Parkinson has credited his experiences at the Breck School for inspiring in him an early love of math and science, an interest which eventually became his life's calling.

Parkinson was a distinguished graduate of the United States Naval Academy, graduating in 1957 with a Bachelor of Science in Engineering. While studying there, Parkinson discovered he had a deep interest in controls engineering, which was introduced in a Senior Level course at the time. Fortunately, one of Parkinson's Electrical Engineering professors was an Air Force officer who urged him to consider being commissioned in the Air Force rather than the Navy. Parkinson also knew he wanted to get a Ph.D. later in life, and the Air Force was more receptive to graduate and post-graduate education at this time.

After being commissioned in the Air Force, he was trained in electronics maintenance and supervised large ground radar installations in Washington state. He then was sponsored by USAF to attend MIT, studying controls engineering, inertial guidance, astronautics and electrical engineering. Parkinson worked in the lab of Charles Stark Draper, the namesake for the prestigious Draper Prize which Parkinson went on to win later in his life. At MIT, he received a Master of Science in Aeronautics and Astronautics in 1961 and was elected to the Tau Beta Pi and Sigma Xi honor Societies.

Parkinson was then assigned to work at the Central Inertial Guidance Test Facility at Holloman Air Force Base in Alamogordo, New Mexico. There he developed tests and was a Chief Analyst for the evaluation of the Air Force’s inertial guidance systems and continued work on electrical and controls engineering. In 1964, after three years at Holloman, Parkinson was assigned to a Ph.D. program at Stanford University graduating in 1966, with a degree in Aeronautics and Astronautics.

== Career ==
=== Air Force duty ===
After graduating from the Naval Academy, Parkinson opted to perform regular Air Force duty in order to, as he put it, “find out what the Air Force was all about”. He served two years as Chief Communications-Electronics officer at an early warning station In Washington State. After finishing his Ph.D. at Stanford, he was assigned to the U.S. Air Force Test Pilot School (1966–68) as an academic instructor and was chief of their Simulation Division. He also was chief academic instructor to a class of USAF Astronauts, including many who later joined NASA and flew on the Space Shuttle.

He then attended the Air Force Command and Staff College for a year where he became a Distinguished Graduate.

Next, he was assigned as a Professor and Deputy Head of the Air Force Academy Department of Astronautics and Computer Science. In the midst of his first year he was detached to help with the development of a brand-new version of the AC-130 gunship. In particular, he led the final development of the innovative digital fire-control system. After successful testing at Eglin Air Force Base, he deployed to South East Asia during the Vietnam War and flew 26 combat missions to continue evaluation and refinement of the weapons system. During this deployment he logged more than 170 hours of combat missions, and was awarded a number of military honors including the Bronze Star, Meritorious Service Medal, two Air Medals and a Presidential Unit Citation. He then returned to the Air Force Academy as the Head of the Department of Astronautics and Computer Science.

He next was a student at the Naval War College, in Newport, Rhode Island, for a year where he graduated with distinction and was followed by a brief assignment as the Chief Engineer of the Advanced Ballistic Re-Entry System (ABRES) project, at Los Angeles Air Force Station.

=== NAVSTAR project ===
In 1973, thanks in part to the influence of his mentor, General William W. Dunn, the Commander, Lt-Gen Kenneth Schultz, assigned Parkinson to a floundering Air Force program called Project 621B. This program had been trying to gain approval for a new satellite-based navigation system concept. Strong technical support was rendered by The Aerospace Corporation. Parkinson quickly recruited a small cadre of highly competent Air Force Officer-Engineers, with Masters and PhDs from top universities. After initially failing to gain approval in August 1973, Parkinson called a remote site meeting in The Pentagon over Labor Day 1973 called the "Lonely Halls Meeting." At that meeting, attended only by his officer-engineers and two people from the Aerospace Corporation, he led the re-architecture of the concept. He then assumed lead responsibility to sell the new configuration to the Air Force and to top Pentagon Officials. By December 1973 he gained approval and budget for a four satellite, live demonstration of the new idea. This included the concept of flying Atomic clocks in high orbits that had been advocated by both the Naval Research Laboratory and an earlier USAF Aerospace study by J. B. Woodford and H. Nakamura.

Parkinson then assumed full, direct control of the development of the demonstration system, which included satellites, a global ground control system, nine types of user receivers, and an extensive land, sea and air test program. He testified before congress and explained that there would be an “at-risk” signal to freely support civilian applications of precision positioning from the outset. In 1978, Parkinson was the launch Commander for the first prototype GPS satellite to be launched (forty-four months after go-ahead). Later that year, the test program verified every performance claim that Parkinson had made. Parkinson was then offered a job as the Air Force aid to the Secretary of Defense. Parkinson rather elected to retire from the Air Force.

Over the course of his 26-year military career, Parkinson served twenty-one years in the Air Force, from 1957 to 1978, and five years with the Navy. He retired at the rank of full colonel.

=== Private sector ===
After retiring from the Air Force in 1978, Parkinson spent one year as a professor of Mechanical Engineering at Colorado State University, Fort Collins. Soon after, he accepted a position as Vice President at the Space Systems Group of the Rockwell International (later absorbed into Boeing), where he was involved in strategic planning and developing advanced—and classified—space systems. From 1980 to 1984, he was vice president and general manager of the Boston software company Intermetrics, which was responsible for creating the currently used HAL/S programming language for NASA’s Space Shuttle program. He was heavily involved in the company’s initial public offering in 1982. In 1984, he left Intermetrics to accept an appointment as a Research Professor at Stanford University. Shortly after, he became a tenured Professor and assumed Stanford’s “Edward C. Wells” Chair of Aeronautics and Astronautics. He taught Astrodynamics, Control Theory, and developed a special course on “Managing Innovation.”

In 1999, he took a leave of absence for a year and served as the CEO of the Sunnyvale based company, Trimble Navigation, a producer of advanced positioning systems. He then returned to his faculty position at Stanford. In 2001 he briefly retired from Stanford and named Emeritus, but was immediately recalled and is currently active, albeit at a lower activity level.

He was also the co-principal investigator and program manager on the NASA/Stanford University endeavor Gravity Probe B, which tested gravitomagnetism and was the first ever direct mechanical test of Einstein’s General Relativity. Using orbiting gyroscopes in satellites, they measured the geodetic effect and frame-dragging. Under NASA sponsorship, this was successfully launched from Vandenberg Air Force Base on April 20, 2004. While the spaceflight phase completed in 2005, the results were announced and published from 2007 to as late as 2015. A Stanford-based analysis group and NASA announced on 4 May 2011 that the data from GP-B indeed confirms the two predictions of Albert Einstein's general theory of relativity.

He has been on many corporate and governmental boards and recently stepped down as Chairman of Jet Propulsion Laboratory’s Advisory Council after thirteen years in the position, long past the usual two-year tenure. He still serves as Co-Chair for the National Executive Committee for Space-Based PNT Advisory Board.

== Invention ==
=== Historical context ===
Beginning with the landmark launch of Sputnik in 1957, the first man-made satellite, members of the aeronautical and military spheres realized that satellite-based positioning was technically feasible, perhaps likely. The United States Navy experimented with the technology in 1960, launching the Transit positioning satellites which was mainly used for submarine navigation, in particular for initializing their on-board ballistic missiles. However, Transit only provided two-dimensional, periodic fixes every several hours with an accuracy of about one-tenth to one-quarter mile. Additional, satellite-based, navigation systems were proposed or launched throughout the 1960s including by the USAF/Aerospace Corporation, the Johns Hopkins Applied Physics Laboratory, and the Naval Research Laboratory. But because of the secrecy and competition for budgets, of such military endeavors, collaboration was minimal. Also, their collective promise of accuracy was not credible to Pentagon officials and they publicly voiced their skepticism of the whole premise. They did not believe the usefulness would justify the cost. Parkinson was met with extreme resistance, but used small-scale prototypes sell what would go on to become GPS.

=== Reception and impact ===
With the advent of The Information Age and the accompanying mobile technology, GPS has become a widely used technology in many sectors. As an example, current mobile phones (Circa.2026) include GPS receivers, and when used in conjunction with GIS mapping software, accurate and real-time directions can be used by civilians. Alongside this, airplanes using GPS are now capable of landing on autopilot, and doing so with high precision and reliable safety records. Outside of military and civilian use seismologists are testing GPS for use in earthquake detection and measurement. Atomic clocks, made popular by the advent of GPS, have been incorporated into a large range of applications including Internet services, banking, and stock markets.

In 1983, President Reagan stated that GPS would be guaranteed to the world, in response to the Soviet downing of a Korean Airliner.

A recent study for the US government estimated the yearly benefit of GPS to be 37 to 74 billion dollars, excluding many of the applications, such as saving lives, that were difficult to quantify.

=== Awards and honors ===
Parkinson has received numerous awards and honors from private organizations, the military, and government bodies, largely for his work on GPS.

Parkinson is an honorary fellow of the Royal institute of Navigation and the AIAA. Also he is a fellow of the American Astronautical Society, and the American Institute of Navigation and he was elected to the National Academy of Engineering in 1990 and elected to the International Academy of Astronautics.

NASA awarded him with both the Public Service Medal in 1994 and the Distinguished Public Service Medal in 2001. In 2003 he shared the Draper Prize with Ivan A. Getting. In 2004 he was inducted into the National Inventors Hall of Fame. In 2016 he received the Marconi Prize. In 2018, he was awarded the IEEE Medal of Honor, their highest award, after previously being awarded their Kershner, Pioneer, M. Barry, and Simon Ramo awards in, 1986, 1994, 1998, and 2002 respectively. The UK’s Institute of Navigation awarded him in 1983 with their Gold Medal and the counterpart US organization of the same name awarded him with their Thurlow, Burka, and Kepler awards in 1986, 1987, and 1991. In 2009, he was the recipient of the Air Force Space Command's Air Force Space and Missile Pioneers. Consumer Technology inducted him into their Hall of Fame in 2010. Asteroid 10041 Parkinson, discovered by Carolyn and Eugene Shoemaker at Palomar Observatory in 1985, was named in his honor. The official naming citation was published by the Minor Planet Center on 21 September 2002 (M.P.C. 46682).

His military awards, in addition to those mentioned for his combat experience, include the Legion of Merit and the Defense Superior Performance Medal. He was selected as a “Distinguished Graduate” of the US Naval Academy in 2011, and an “Engineering Hero” of Stanford in 2012.

== Personal life ==
Bradford Parkinson was born in Madison, Wisconsin on February 16, 1935, but grew up in Minneapolis, Minnesota. He is the only son of Herbert Parkinson, an architect who was also an alumnus of MIT.

== Patents ==
Parkinson, U.S. Patent 5,726,659, “Multipath calibration in GPS pseudorange measurements”
Parkinson, U.S. Patent 6,434,462, “GPS control of a tractor-towed implement"
Parkinson, U.S. Patent 6,732,024, “Method and apparatus for vehicle control, navigation and positioning"
Parkinson, U.S. Patent 6,052,647, “Method and system for automatic control of vehicles based on carrier phase differential GPS"
Parkinson, U.S. Patent 6,373,432, "System using leo satellites for centimeter-level navigation"
Parkinson, U.S. Patent 5,572,218, "System and method for generating precise position determinations"
Parkinson, U.S. Patent RE37,256, "System and method for generating precise position determinations"
