= Royal Photographic Society =

British photographic society

The Royal Photographic Society
- Formation: 20 January 1853; 173 years ago
- Headquarters: Bristol, England
- Members: 11,000
- Patron: Catherine, Princess of Wales
- President: Simon Hill, CPhot HonFRPS
- CEO: Victoria Humphries
- Website: rps.org

The Royal Photographic Society of Great Britain, commonly known as the Royal Photographic Society (RPS), is the world's oldest photographic society having been in continuous existence since 1853. It was founded in London, England, in 1853 as the Photographic Society of London with the objective of promoting the art and science of photography, and in the same year, received royal patronage from then-Queen Victoria and Prince Albert.

A change to the society's name to reflect the patronage was, however, not considered expedient at the time. In 1874, it was renamed the Photographic Society of Great Britain, and only from 1894 did it become known as the Royal Photographic Society of Great Britain, a title which it continues to use today. On 25 June 2019, the Duchess of Cambridge, now Catherine, Princess of Wales, became the Society's Patron, taking over from Queen Elizabeth II who had been patron since 1952.

A registered charity since 1962, in July 2004, the society was granted a royal charter recognising its eminence in the field of photography as a learned society. For most of its history the Society was based at various premises in London; it moved to Bath in 1980 and since 2019 its headquarters has been in Bristol. Membership remains international and open to anyone with an interest in photography.

In addition to ordinary membership, the Society offers three levels of distinction: Licentiate, Associate and Fellow. These set recognised standards of achievement throughout the world, and can be applied for by both members and non-members, in all aspects of photography and vocational qualifications in the areas of creative industries and imaging science. The Society runs a programme of events throughout the United Kingdom and abroad, through local groups and special interest groups. The Society acts as a national voice for photographers and for photography more generally, and it represents these interests on a range of governmental and national bodies dealing with matters such as copyright and photographers' rights.

== History ==
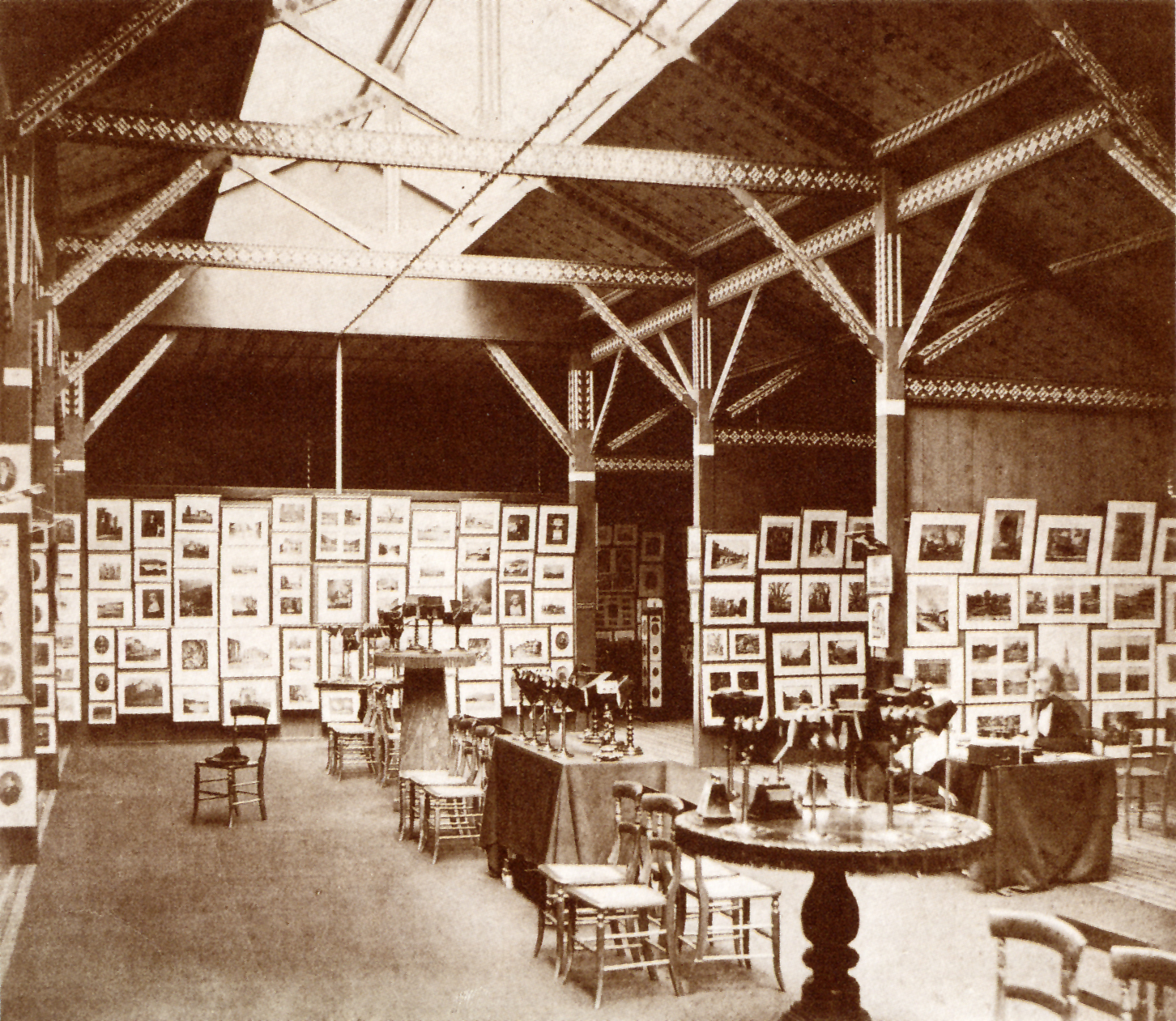
Charles Thurston Thompson: Exhibition of the Photographic Society, London, 1858

Photographers were slow in coming together and forming clubs and societies. The first was an informal grouping the Edinburgh Calotype Club around 1843. The first British photographic society, the Leeds Photographic Society was formed in 1852 but between 1878 and 1881 it ceased to exist independently. The RPS has existed continuously since January 1853. In other countries the Société héliographique was established in Paris in 1851 and the Société française de photographie was founded in Paris in 1854.

=== Founding and early history ===
The catalyst behind the formation of The Photographic Society was Roger Fenton. The Great Exhibition of 1851 had raised public awareness of photography and in December 1852 an exhibition of nearly 800 photographs at The Society of Arts had brought together amateur and professional photographers. The inaugural meeting of The Photographic Society was held on 20 January 1853. Fenton became the Society's first secretary, a position he held for three years and Henry White was an early treasurer between 1866 and 1872.

=== Modernisation and the 1970s ===
As Jane Fletcher has argued the changing nature of photography and photographic education in the early 1970s forced The Society to modernise and to become more relevant to British photography. An internal review led to constitutional changes, the introduction of a new distinction called the Licentiate in 1972 and six new specialist groups were established.

=== Bath project ===
The rising cost of maintaining The Society's premises in South Audley Street, London, eventually led the society's executive committee to look for alternative premises. The Council approved at a meeting on 1 April 1977 a move to Bath and the establishment of a National Centre of Photography to house the Society's headquarters and collection. An appeal for £300,000 was launched in the summer of 1978 for the funds needed to convert The Octagon and adjacent buildings in Milsom Street, Bath. The inaugural exhibition opened in May 1980 with the building officially opened by Princess Margaret in April 1981.

=== Premises ===
Although the Society's inaugural meeting took places at the Society of Arts in London, it was some time before the Society had its own permanent home. It held functions as a number of London addresses, some concurrently for different types of meetings.

Premises used were: Royal Society of Arts, John Adam Street; 20 Bedford Street, 4 Trafalgar Square, 21 Regent Street, 28 George Street (Hanover Square), 1 Coventry Street; Kings College, Strand; 9 Conduit Street, 5A Pall Mall East – used for certain meetings until 1899; 50 Great Russell Street; and 12 Hanover Square.

The Society's premises were:

- 1899–1909 – 66 Russell Square, London.
- 1909–1940 – 35 Russell Square, London.
- 1940–1968 – Princes Gate, South Kensington, London.
- 1968–1970 – 1 Maddox Street, Mayfair, London (temporary premises).
- 1970–1979 – 14 South Audley Street, Mayfair, London
- 1980–2003 – The Octagon, Milsom Street, Bath.
- 2004–2019 – Fenton House, 122 Wells Road, Bath; officially opened 16 February 2005.
- 2019–2025 - RPS House, Paintworks, Bath Road, Bristol.
- July 2025 - HERE, 470 Bath Road, Bristol, BS4 3AP

In May 2024 the RPS announced it would sell Paintworks to invest the funds in modernisation and to hold more activities at locations across the UK, closer to its membership.

== Collection and archive ==
=== Collection ===
The Society had collected photographs and items of historical importance on an ad hoc basis, particularly from the 1890s. With the appointment of John Dudley Johnston as Honorary Curator, a post he held from 1924 to 1955, a more proactive approach was taken to collecting. Before Johnston's appointment the collection had concentrated on technical advances of photography, and he began add pictorial photography to the holdings. On Johnston's death in 1955 the role of Honorary Curator was taken over by his wife Florence and a succession of paid and unpaid staff, with Margaret Harker as Honorary Curator over a long period. The collection was moved to the National Museum of Photography, Film, and Television at Bradford (later the National Media Museum) in 2002; the move was supported by the Head of the museum, Amanda Nevill, who had been the society's secretary in the 1990s.

By 1953 the number of items in the society's collection had reached 'upwards' of 3000 items. At the time of the collection's transfer to Bradford it consisted of some 270,000 photographic objects, over 6,000 items of photographic equipment, 13,000 books, 13,000 bound periodicals and 5,000 other photography-related documents.

The collection was transferred from the National Media Museum to the Victoria and Albert Museum in 2017, where it forms a central part of the museum's Photography Centre.

The RPS is forming a new RPS Collection of photographs and material relevant to its own history, that of its former members and which will support its educational activities.

The Tyng Collection, part of the RPS Collection and now at the V&A Museum, is a collection of outstanding pictorial photography started in 1927 by an American philanthropist and society member, Stephen H. Tyng. He established a foundation to promote and recognise photographic work of outstanding pictorial merit. The first colour print to be accepted into the Tyng Collection, in 1960, was "Madrasi Fishermen" taken by S. D. Jouhar during his six-month trip to India in 1959.

=== Archives ===
The society's early records, Council, Committee and Meeting Minute books, are held with the society's collection at the V&A. There is no published or online record of former or current members of the society. Occasional lists of members were published by the society up the 1890s when lists were issued more regularly; from the 1930s membership lists were issued periodically, and the last in 1947. They are now not issued. New members have usually been recorded in the Photographic Journal. Michael Pritchard undertook a project to make an online searchable database of members from 1853 to 1901, published by De Montfort University's photographic history research centre. The Society has a card index of members from the late 1920s to 1980s, which it will search on request, and may also be able to assist with membership enquiries between 1900 and the 1930s.

== Publications ==
From the Society's formation it has published a journal and other publications have been issued over the years.

=== The Photographic Journal ===
The Society's journal was originally called The Journal of the Photographic Society of London and for most of its existence has simply been called The Photographic Journal, it is now called RPS Journal. It has been published continuously since 1853 making it the UK's oldest photographic periodical. The journal, particularly in its early years was read and distributed beyond the Society's membership. Past editors have included Arthur Henfrey, Hugh Welch Diamond, William de Wiveleslie Abney, H. H. Blacklock, and more recently Jack Schofield and David Land. The current editor is Kathleen Morgan.

=== The Imaging Science Journal ===
The Society publishes a peer-reviewed journal devoted to imaging science and technology, The Imaging Science Journal (ISG), previously known as the Journal of Photographic Science. The ISJ is now published on behalf of The Society by Maney Publishing in print and digital versions.

=== The Year's Photography ===
The Year's Photography was published annually by the Society from 1922 until at least 1961. The flyleaf of the 1957 edition states: "This edition contains a selection from all the exhibitions held in 1956 under the Society's auspices which contained pictures suitable for reproduction There are also review of artistic photography and of the nature exhibition." The publication gives a broad overview of the state of British amateur and professional photography during the year.

=== Other publications ===
Over the years the Society has published a number of one-off publications often in partnership with commercial publishers. These include John Wall's Directory of British Photographic Collections in conjunction with Heinemann (1977), Roger Reynolds (ed.), Portfolio One (2007) and Roger Reynolds (ed.), Portfolio Two (2010). The Society publishes an annual International Print Exhibition catalogue and increasingly publishes digital catalogues of its exhibitions.

== Membership ==
There are no restrictions on membership, which is international and includes amateur and professional photographers, photographic scientists and those involved in exhibiting, curating and writing about photography, as well as those with a general interest in the medium. Many of the great names in photographic history as well as many well-known photographers today have been members.

== Special interest groups ==
The Society established special interest groups to cater for specific interests within the membership. These have included:

- Pictorial Group (now renamed Visual Art Group) (1919)
- Science and Technical Group (now renamed Imaging Science Group) (1920)
- Kinematograph Group (1923)
- Colour Group (1927)
- Historical Group (1972)
- Digital Imaging Group (1996)
- Documentary Group (date)
- Contemporary Group (1989)
- Landscape Group (date)
- Analogue Group (date)
- Women in Photography Group (date)
- Audio Visual Group (date)
- Travel Group (1970)

As of 2016 there are fourteen groups

== Distinctions and qualifications ==
Until 1895 membership was limited simply to 'members' with some minor variations for those living overseas. In that year the Society introduced a new membership category of Fellow and it now offers (from lowest to highest distinction):

- LRPS: Licentiate of the Royal Photographic Society introduced in 1972
- ARPS: Associate of the Royal Photographic Society introduced in 1924
- FRPS: Fellowship of the Royal Photographic Society introduced in 1895

These require the submission of evidence, photographs or writtenm which is assessed by competent panels before they are awarded by the Society's Council. The society also awards honorary fellowship, HonFRPS, to the persons who distinguished themselves in the field of photography. Usually, those awarded are famous and extremely known photographers in the field of art photography. Every year, no more than eight persons are awarded HonFRPS, including society incoming president and recipients of society's Progress and Centenary Medals.

In addition, the Society's Imaging Scientist Qualifications provide a structure leading to professional qualifications for engineers, scientists, and technologists whose professional activities are concerned with quantitative or mechanic aspects of imaging systems or their applications. These are broken down into four levels;

- QIS; Qualified Imaging Scientist and Licentiate (QIS LRPS) of the Royal Photographic Society (Level 1)
- GIS; Graduate Imaging Scientist and Associate (GIS ARPS) of the Royal Photographic Society (Level 2)
- AIS; Accredited Imaging Scientist and Associate (AIS ARPS) of the Royal Photographic Society (Level 3)
- ASIS; Accredited Senior Imaging Scientist and Fellow (ASIS FRPS) of the Royal Photographic Society (Level 4)

The RPS introduced in 2013 a qualification for those working in the Creative Industries and using photography. These also carry the Society's Distinction and, like the Imaging Science Qualification, the two are used together.

- QCIQ; Qualified in Creative Industries and Licentiate (QCIQ LRPS) of the Royal Photographic Society
- GCIQ; Graduate in Creative Industries and Associate (GCIQ ARPS) of the Royal Photographic Society
- ACIQ; Accredited in Creative Industries and Associate (ACIQ ARPS) of the Royal Photographic Society
- ASCIQ; Accredited Senior in Creative Industries and Fellowship (ASCIQ FRPS) of the Royal Photographic Society

Since 2025 the RPS has also offered Chartered Photographer status for those actively working professionally within photography. This carries the postnominals: CPhot.

== Exhibitions ==
The Society has held an annual exhibition since 1854 and in 2025 it will show its 166th edition. The Society now holds an annual International Photography Exhibition, which tours the United Kingdom, and other exhibitions. At its new headquarters it shows four major photography exhibitions annually.

== Workshops ==
The Society runs more than 300 workshops and lectures throughout the UK that are open to members and non-members. Many are held at the RPS headquarters in Bristol and range from an Introduction to Digital Photography to Plant and Garden Photography.

== Awards and medals ==
Each year the Society presents a series of awards to photographers and other individuals in photography. The recipient receives a medal.

The highest award of the RPS is the Progress Medal, which was instituted in 1878.

The Society's other annual awards are the: Centenary Medal, Award for Cinematic Production, Award for Outstanding Service to Photography, the Combined Royal Colleges Medal, the Education Award, the Fenton Award (and Honorary Life Membership), the Hood Medal, the J Dudley Johnston Medal, the Lumière Award, RPS Member's Award (and Honorary Life Membership), the Selwyn Award, the Vic Odden Award, and The Bill Wisden Fellowship of the Year.

=== Progress Medal ===
The Progress Medal is awarded in recognition of any invention, research, publication or other contribution which has resulted in an important advance in the scientific or technological development of photography or imaging in the widest sense. It also carries with it an Honorary Fellowship of The Society. Recipients have been:

- 1878 – William de Wiveleslie Abney
- 1881 – W. Willis
- 1882 – Leon Warnerke
- 1883 – Walter B. Woodbury
- 1884 – Josef Maria Eder
- 1885 – Josef Maria Eder
- 1890 – William de Wiveleslie Abney
- 1891 – James Waterhouse
- 1895 – Peter Henry Emerson
- 1896 – Thomas Rudolphus Dallmeyer
- 1897 – Gabriel Lippmann
- 1898 – Ferdinand Hurter and Vero Charles Driffield
- 1899 – No award
- 1900 – Louis Ducos du Hauron
- 1901 – Richard Leach Maddox
- 1902 – Joseph Wilson Swan
- 1903 – Frederic Eugene Ives
- 1904 – Not awarded
- 1905 – Paul Rudolph
- 1906 – Pierre Jules César Janssen
- 1907 – E Sanger Shepherd
- 1908 – John Sterry
- 1909 – A Lumiere and sons
- 1910 – Alfred Watkins
- 1911 – Not awarded
- 1912 – Henry Chapman Jones
- 1913 – Charles Edward Kenneth Mees
- 1914 – William Bates Ferguson
- 1915 – André Callier
- 1916–1920 – Not awarded
- 1921 – Frank Forster Renwick
- 1922 – Not awarded
- 1923 – Nahum Ellan Luboshez
- 1924 – Alfred Stieglitz
- 1925–26 – Not awarded
- 1927 – George Eastman
- 1928 – Samuel E Sheppard
- 1929 – Olaf F Bloch
- 1932 – Hinricus Lüppo-Cramer
- 1935 – Harold Dennis Taylor
- 1936 – Arthur Samuel Newman
- 1944 – Francis James Mortimer CBE
- 1946 – John G Capstaff
- 1947 – Not awarded
- 1948 – Loyd Ancile Jones
- 1949 – John Eggert
- 1950 – Louis Phillippe Clerc
- 1951 – J Dudley Johnston
- 1952 – Charles Edward Kenneth Mees
- 1953 – Marcel Abribat
- 1954 – Julian Webb
- 1955 – J. D. Kendall
- 1956 – Not awarded
- 1957 – Edwin H. Land
- 1959 – Cecil Waller
- 1960 – Edward J. Steichen
- 1961 – André Rott
- 1962 – Frances M. Hamer
- 1963 – Leopold Godowsky Jr. and Leopold Mannes
- 1964 – Harold Eugene Edgerton
- 1965 – Walter Clark
- 1966 – L. Fritz Gruber
- 1967 – E. R. Davies
- 1968 – Konstantine Vladimirovich Chibosov
- 1969 – Laurence E. Hallett
- 1970 – W. F. Berg
- 1971 – Edward William Herbert Selwyn
- 1972 – Hellmut Frieser
- 1973 – T. Howard James
- 1974 – Man Ray
- 1975 – Beaumont Newhall
- 1976 – W. T. Hanson Jr
- 1977 – Stephen Dalton
- 1978 – Photographic Technology Division, NASA
- 1979 – Bill Brandt
- 1980 – Oxford Scientific Films
- 1981 – Norman Parkinson
- 1982 – Sue Davies
- 1983 – R. W. G. Hunt
- 1984 – Tom Hopkinson
- 1985 – Lord Snowdon
- 1986 – Yuri Denisyuk
- 1987 – Roy Jeffreys
- 1988 – David Hockney
- 1989 – Eric Hosking
- 1990 – Tadaaki Tani
- 1991 – John Szarkowski
- 1992 – G Farnell
- 1993 – Lennart Nilsson
- 1994 – John Wesley Mitchell
- 1995 – Thomas Knoll and John Knoll
- 1996 – Paul B Gilman
- 1998 – Emmett N. Leith
- 1999 – Leo J Thomas
- 2000 – A Zaleski
- 2001 – C T Elliott
- 2002 – Brad B. Amos and John G. White
- 2003 – Tim Berners-Lee
- 2004 – Eric R. Fossum
- 2005 – Carver Mead, Richard F. Lyon, Richard B. Merrill
- 2006 – Ferenc Krausz
- 2007 – Larry J. Hornbeck
- 2008 – David Attenborough
- 2009 – Bryce E. Bayer
- 2010 – Nobukazu Teranishi
- 2011 – Rodney Shaw
- 2012 – Steven J. Sasson
- 2013 – Paul B. Corkum
- 2014 – Tim Webber
- 2015 – George E. Smith
- 2016 – Palmer Luckey
- 2017 – Michael Francis Tompsett
- 2018 – Jacques Dubochet, Joachim Frank, Richard Henderson
- 2019 – Alan Bovik
- 2020 – Chuck Hull
- 2021 – Katie Bouman
- 2022 – Leonardo Chiariglione and Graham Hudson
- 2023 – Christopher Dainty
- 2024 - Rita Hoffmann-Sievert
- 2025 - David Malin.

=== Centenary Medal ===
According to the Society's website this award is "in recognition of a sustained, significant contribution to the art of photography". Recipients have been:

- 1993 – Sebastião Salgado
- 1994 – Cornell Capa
- 1995 – Robert Delpire
- 1996–1997 – Freddie Young
- 1998 – Josef Koudelka
- 1999 – William Klein
- 2000 – Ray Metzker
- 2001 – Paul Caponigro
- 2002 – Elliott Erwitt
- 2003 – Special anniversary medals awarded (150th anniversary)
- 2004 – Arnold Newman
- 2005 – David Bailey
- 2006 – Susan Meiselas
- 2007 – Don McCullin
- 2008 – Martin Parr
- 2009 – Annie Leibovitz
- 2010 – Albert Watson
- 2011 – Terry O'Neill
- 2012 – Joel Meyerowitz
- 2013 – Brian Griffin
- 2014 – Steve McCurry
- 2015 – Wolfgang Tillmans
- 2016 – Thomas Struth
- 2017 – Hiroshi Sugimoto
- 2018 – Nan Goldin
- 2019 – Sophie Calle
- 2020 – Sally Mann
- 2021 – Bruce Davidson
- 2022 – Destiny Deacon
- 2023 – Ralph Gibson
- 2024 - Ingrid Pollard
- 2025 - Susan Derges.

=== Cinematic Production Award ===
This award is given to an individual for outstanding achievement or sustained contribution in the production, direction or development of film for the cinema, television, online or new media. Recipients have been:

- 2017 – David Heyman
- 2018 – Tim Bevan & Eric Fellner
- 2019 – Yorgos Lanthimos
- 2020 – Steve McQueen
- 2021 – Ava DuVernay
- 2022 – Werner Herzog

=== Award for Outstanding Service to Photography ===
According to the Society's website this award "carries with it an Honorary Fellowship of The Society. It recognizes major sustained, outstanding and influential contributions to the advancement of Photography and/or Imaging in their widest meanings." The recipients are:

- 2009 – Santhosh Varghese Kappola
- 2010 – Michael G. Wilson
- 2011 – Philippe Garner
- 2012 – Kathy Ryan
- 2013 – Weston Naef
- 2014 – Terence Pepper
- 2015 – Maria Morris
- 2016 – William Ewing
- 2017 – Anthony d'Offay
- 2018 – Brett Rogers
- 2019 – Mark Sealy
- 2020 – Deborah Willis
- 2021 – Zelda Cheatle
- 2022 – Howard Greenberg

=== Combined Royal Colleges Medal ===
Established in 1958 by the RPS in collaboration with the Royal College of Physicians of London, the Royal College of Surgeons of England and the Royal College of Obstetricians and Gynaecologists, this medal is awarded for "an outstanding contribution to the advancement and/or application of medical photography or the wider field of medical imaging".

- 2005 – Simon Brown
- 2006 – John Priestley
- 2007 – Nancy Durrell McKenna
- 2008 – Francis Ring
- 2009 – Catherine Draycott
- 2010 – Spike Walker
- 2011 – Northumbria Healthcare and Northumbria University Arts Partnership 2012 Micrima and The University of Bristol Microwave Imaging Group
- 2013 – Anders Persson
- 2014 – Emeritus Adolf Friedrich Fercher
- 2015 – Gavriel J. Idann
- 2016 – Caroline Wilkinson
- 2017 – Andrew Bastawrous
- 2018 – Kev Dhaliwal, Mark Bradley
- 2019 – Reza Razavi
- 2020 – Pankaj Chandak
- 2021 – Douglas Anderson
- 2023 – Daniyal Jafree, David Long, and Claire Walsh

=== Education Award ===
According to the Society's website this award "is given for outstanding achievement or sustained contribution in photographic education". The recipients are:

- 2011 – Paul Delmar, who taught Press Photography and Photojournalism at Norton College, Sheffield, for 30 years
- 2012 – Anne Williams, Programme Director for Photography at London College of Communication
- 2013 – Conrad Tracy
- 2014 – Corinne Noordenbos
- 2015 – David Alan Mellor
- 2016 – Paul Hill
- 2017 – Oliver Richon
- 2018 – David Bate
- 2019 – Beverley Carruthers
- 2020 – Andrea Liggins
- 2021 – Esther Teichmann
- 2023 – Max Houghton
- 2024 - Jennifer Good

=== Fenton Medal / Fenton Award (and Honorary Life Membership) ===
This award, established in 1980 and named after Roger Fenton, one of the RPS's founders, is made for an outstanding contribution to the work of The Royal Photographic Society. Usually, up to four Fenton Medals are awarded each year and since 1998 this award carries Honorary Membership of the RPS.

- 1980 – E. J. Moorfoot, R. Boyes, K. Warr
- 1981 – C. Morris
- 1982 – E. Nicholson
- 1983 – L. Bowcock, George and Lady Pollock, Eve Ritscher
- 1984 – Sam Welford
- 1985 – John Bardsley
- 1986 – R. J. Cox
- 1987 – J. D. J. Cole, R. H. Mason, G Smith
- 1988 – R Brightman, Herbert Dennis
- 1989 – David Dearnley, Pat Hallett, Prof M. Harker, E. Pothecary
- 1990 – Arthur Downes
- 1991 – Anne Bolt, Barry Mead
- 1992 – Peter Wilkinson, Desmond Groves, Kay Gordon, David Nellist
- 1993 – Edward Bowman, Hilary Graves, Matheson Beaumont
- 1994 – Margaret Hodge, Mervyn Leonardo de Calcina-Goff
- 1995 – Gustav Ahrens, Colin Balls, H. S. Fry
- 1996/7 – Brian Bower, Michael R. Pointer, Anthony J. Waterlow
- 1998 – Michael Austin, Tony Hilton, Tan Lip Seng
- 1999 – Peter Agius, Akira Aoki, David Tay Poey Cher
- 2000 – Joan Wakelin, Jon Richardson
- 2001 – John Long, Ossie Morris, Bill Wisden
- 2002 – Bryn Campbell, Roger Reynolds, Michael Christianson, Roy Green
- 2003 – Jane H. Black, Ron Frampton, Robert F. Moore, Jerry Wooldridge
- 2004 – Andy Callow, D. H. O. John, Keith Lawrey, A. Sethna
- 2005 – Sandy Cleland, Richard Sadler, Margaret Salisbury, Keith Suddaby
- 2006 – Andy Golding, Mark Haworth-Booth, Alan Millward, Tony Troman
- 2007 – Carol Agar, John Hankin LRPS, Robin Jenkin, Brian Steptoe, Tony Wharton
- 2008 – John Chamberlin, Peter Sephton Coles, Tom Dodd, John Page
- 2009 – Sara Beaugeard, Robert F. Rowe, Nicholas J. Scott, Roger Tooth, Jeff Vickers
- 2010 – Ian Bailey LRPS, Julian Comrie, Ralph Jacobson, David J. Wood
- 2011 – Des Clinton, Jim Moreland, Francis Ring, Barry Senior
- 2012 – Philip Ellis, Michael Hallett, Jack Jackson, Ray Spence
- 2013 – Afzal Ansary, Alan Elliott, Dawn Osborne, Tim Rudman
- 2014 – Andy Finney, Sue Harper, Jenny Leathes, Robert Tapper
- 2015 – Mark Buckley-Sharp, Anne Cassidy, Paul Goodman, Leo Palmer
- 2016 – John Bebbington, Hermon Dowling, Paul Hill, Andrea Liggins, John R Simpson
- 2020 – Tony Kaye, Armando Jongejan, David Osborn
- 2021 – Mary Crowther, Mark Reeves, Stewart Wall, Rex Waygood, Peter Hayes
- 2022 – Richard Brown, Sue Brown, Robert Gates, Janet Haines
- 2023 - Vanessa Slawson, Rajen Nandwana, Dr Rolf Kraehenbuehl, Chris Renk

=== Hood Medal ===
This medal is awarded "for a body of photographic work produced to promote or raise awareness of an aspect of public benefit or service". It was instituted in 1933 when Harold Hood offered to present an annual medal for photography with a particular emphasis on work for public service. The recipients have been:

- 1933 – G. Aubourne Clarke
- 1935 – Edwin H. Land
- 1936 – J. Crowther Cos
- 1948 – J. W. Cottingham
- 1939 – J. A. Fairfax-Fozzard
- 1941 – H. Bedford Lemere
- 1942 – Basil Hill
- 1945 – Margaret F. Harker
- 1946 – J. Crowther Cos
- 1947 – S. H. Thorpe
- 1948 – Margaret F. Harker
- 1949 – W. Mortensen
- 1950 – L. M. Condax
- 1951 – Institute of Ophthalmology (Department of Medical Illustration)
- 1956 – A. Faulkner Taylor
- 1957 – Clive Cadwallader
- 1958 – Maurice Broomfield
- 1959 – E. Victor Willmott
- 1960 – Walter Nurnberg
- 1961 – Alan S. Marshall
- 1962 – Adolf Morath
- 1964 – Gordon Clemetson
- 1966 – T. C. Dodds
- 1968 – W. H. Baddeley
- 1970 – K. G. Moreman
- 1971 – Stephen Dalton
- 1972 – Pat Whitehouse
- 1973 – John Chittock
- 1974 – R. M. Callender
- 1975 – Heather Angel
- 1976 – Ronald Smith
- 1977 – Jacques Cousteau
- 1978 – Lord Snowdon
- 1979 – Richard Attenborough
- 1980 – Harold Evans
- 1981 – Freddie Reed
- 1982 – Brian Tremain
- 1983 – John Webster
- 1984 – Brian Coe
- 1985 – Leslie Ryder
- 1986 – Zoe Dominic
- 1987 – Mark Haworth-Booth
- 1988 – Clifford Bestall
- 1989 – Colin Ford
- 1990 – Mike Ware
- 1992 – Llanfranco Colombo
- 1993 – Karl Steinorth
- 2003 – Joop Berendsen, Tom Gatsonides, Ted Janssen
- 2004 – Mark Holborn
- 2005 – Mike Birbeck
- 2006 – Ron Smith
- 2007 – Mark Sealy
- 2008 – Gina Glover
- 2009 – François Hébel
- 2010 – Tiffany Fairey, Anna Blackman
- 2011 – Edmund Clark
- 2012 – Marcus Bleasdale
- 2013 – Derek Kendall
- 2014 – James Balog
- 2015 – Jean-Jacques Naudet
- 2016 – Nick Hedges
- 2017 – Siân Davey
- 2019 – Laia Abril
- 2020 – Poulomi Basu
- 2021 – Dexter McLean
- 2022 – Hoda Afshar

=== J Dudley Johnston Award / Medal ===
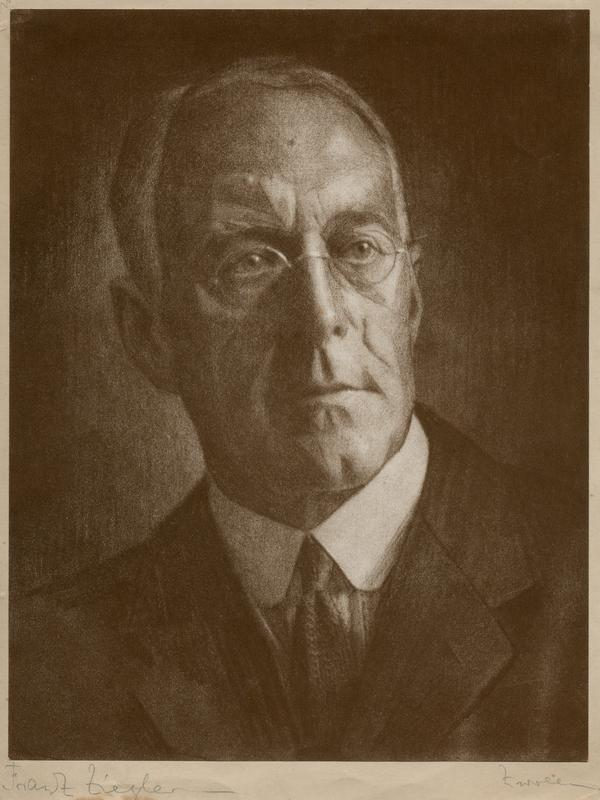
J. Dudley Johnston (photo by Franz Ziegler, 1929)

According to the Society's website this is an "award for major achievement in the field of photographic criticism or the history of photography. To be awarded for sustained excellence over a period of time, or for a single outstanding publication". The recipients are:

- 1998 – Larry Schaaf
- 1999 – Vicki Goldberg
- 2000 – Colin Westerbeck
- 2001 – Bill Jay
- 2002 – Mike Weaver
- 2003 – Sara Stevenson
- 2004 – Colin Harding (Photohistory) and Val Williams (Curatorship)
- 2005 – Ian Jeffrey (Photohistory) and David Mellor (Curatorship)
- 2006 – Gerhard Steidl (Photohistory) and Martin Harrison
- 2007 – Roger Taylor
- 2008 – Gail Buckland
- 2009 – Matthew Butson
- 2010 – A. D. Coleman
- 2011 – Sean O'Hagan
- 2012 – Anthony Bannon
- 2013 – Martin Barnes
- 2014 – David Campany
- 2015 – Roger Hargreaves
- 2017 – Francis Hodgson
- 2018 – Gerry Badger
- 2019 – Zhuang Wubin
- 2020 – Elizabeth Edwards
- 2021 – Helen Ennis
- 2022 – Liz Wells

=== Lumière Award ===
The Lumière Award is given for major achievement in British cinematography, video or animation.

- 1999 – Jack Cardiff
- 2000 – Alan Parker
- 2001 – Freddie Francis
- 2002 – William MacQuitty
- 2003 – Ridley Scott
- 2004 – Seamus McGarvey
- 2005 – Peter Lord, Nick Park, David Sproxton
- 2006 – John Mathieson
- 2007 – Martyn Colbeck
- 2008 – Giles Nuttgens
- 2009 – Roger Deakins
- 2010 – Chris Menges
- 2011 – Anthony Dod Mantle
- 2012 – Barry Ackroyd
- 2013 – John de Borman
- 2014 – Robbie Ryan
- 2015 – Dick Pope
- 2016 – Emmanuel Lubezki
- 2017 – Hoyte van Hoytema
- 2018 – Rachel Morrison
- 2019 – Łukasz Żal
- 2020 – Linus Sandgren
- 2021 – Phoebe Boswell
- 2022 – John Akomfrah

=== RPS Member's Award (and Honorary Life Membership) ===
An award, established in 2005, given to an ordinary member who, in the opinion of Council, has shown extraordinary support for The Society over a sustained period.

- 2005 – Frederick Smith
- 2006 – Matti Selanne
- 2007 – John Arnold Hubbard
- 2008 – Elaine Herbert
- 2009 – Ken Huscroft, Harry Miller
- 2010 – Hoosain M. Ebrahim; Charles Mahnken
- 2011 – Sylvia B. Jones
- 2012 – Mick Medley
- 2013 – Carol Palmer
- 2014 – Judith Parry, Patricia Ann Ruddle
- 2015 – Alexander Melrose
- 2016 – Mary O'Connor
- 2017 – Paul Hurst
- 2018 – Mike Christianson
- 2019 – John Margetts
- 2020 – Judy Buckley-Sharp
- 2021 – Sheila Haycox
- 2022 – Mark Phillips

=== Selwyn Award ===
This award is intended for those under-35 years who have conducted successful science-based research connected with imaging. Sponsored by the Imaging Science Group of the RSP, it was introduced in 1994 in memory of the photographic scientist E. W. H. Selwyn, who was the recipient of the Progress Medal in 1971 and the Williamson Research Award in 1936.

- 1994 – J. R. Palmer
- 1995 – A. Clarke
- 1996–1997 – Andrew Fitz
- 1998 – Adrian Ford
- 1999 – Juliet Rason
- 2000 – Sophie Triantaphillidou
- 2001 – Serguei Endrikhovski
- 2002 – Robin Jenkin
- 2003 – Ján Morovic
- 2004 – Efthimia Bilissi
- 2005 – Elizabeth Allen
- 2006 – James Sharpe
- 2007 – Christien J. Merrifield
- 2008 – Vien Cheung
- 2009 – Iris Sprow
- 2010 – Agnieszka Bialek
- 2011 – Toby P. Breckon
- 2012 – Anna Fricker
- 2013 – Yi-Ren Ng
- 2014 – Wen Luo
- 2015 – Not awarded
- 2016 – Gaurav Gupta
- 2017 – Lounis Chermak
- 2018 – Emma Talbot
- 2019 – Tobias Houlton
- 2020 – Maria Castaneyra-Ruiz
- 2021 – Carolyn Erolin
- 2022 – Edward Fry

=== Vic Odden Award ===
According to the Society's website this is an "award offered for a notable achievement in the art of photography by a British photographer aged 35 or under, endowed in memory of Vic Odden". Recipients of the Vic Odden Award:

- 1999 – Paul Lowe
- 2000 – Harriet Logan
- 2001 – Paul M. Smith
- 2002 – Donovan Wylie
- 2003 – Hannah Starkey
- 2004 – Adam Broomberg & Oliver Chanarin
- 2005 – Tom Craig
- 2006 – Stephen Gill
- 2007 – Simon Roberts
- 2008 – Alixandra Fazzina
- 2009 – James Mollison
- 2010 – Olivia Arthur
- 2011 – Venetia Dearden
- 2012 – Laura Pannack
- 2013 – Kate Peters
- 2014 – Jon Tonks
- 2015 – Matilda Temperley
- 2016 – Chloe Dewe Mathews
- 2017 – Jack Davison
- 2018 – Juno Calypso
- 2019 – Alix Marie
- 2020 – Daniel Castro Garcia
- 2021 – Sylvia Rossi
- 2022 – Carly Clarke

=== The Bill Wisden Fellowship of the Year ===
The Fellowship of the Year, inaugurated in 2012, was named after Bill Wisden for his 50-plus years service to the RSP's Distinctions. It is awarded for the most outstanding Fellowship of the year as decided by the Fellowship Board of The Society from more than 200 applications. Recipients have been:

- 2012 – Dawn McKeown
- 2013 – Paul Walker
- 2014 – Clare Acford
- 2015 – Yap Kok Hing
- 2016 – Tony Bramley

== Previous awards ==
=== Colin Ford Award ===
The RPS established the annual Colin Ford Award in 2003 for contributions to curatorship. It was named after the first director of the UK's National Museum of Photography, Film and Television (now the National Science and Media Museum), in Bradford, Colin Ford. It has not been offered since 2015. Recipients were:

- 2003 – Paul Goodman, Brian Liddy, Amanda Nevill, Russell Roberts
- 2004 – Professor Raymond P. Clark, John R. Page
- 2005 – Philippa Wright
- 2006 – Jane Fletcher
- 2007 – Gregory Hobson
- 2008 – Toni Booth
- 2009 – Pete James
- 2010 – John Falconer
- 2011 – Dusan Stulik & Art Kaplan
- 2012 – Stephen Perloff
- 2013 – Claude W Sui
- 2014 – Sophie Gordon
- 2015 – Els Barents

=== Davies Medal ===
The Davies Medal was instituted in 1998 and was awarded until 2015 "for a significant contribution in the digital field of imaging science". Sponsored by Kodak European Research and Development, the medal was in memory of E. R. Davies, who was a former Research Director of their Harrow Laboratories. Recipients were:

- 1998 – Kai Krause
- 1999 – Michael Kriss
- 2000 – Stephen Watt-Smith
- 2001 – PDavid Whittaker
- 2002 – Ghassan Alusi
- 2003 – M. Ronnier Luo
- 2004 – Peter Burns
- 2005 – David Saunders
- 2006 – Lindsay MacDonald
- 2007 – Mark D. Fairchild
- 2008 – Stephen Westland
- 2009 –
- 2010 – Mark Lythgoe
- 2011 – Phil Green
- 2012 – Sophie Triantaphillidou
- 2013 – John D. Meyer
- 2014 – Peter Lawrence
- 2015 – Alessandro Rizzi
- No longer awarded

=== Saxby Medal / Saxby Award ===
An award, no longer awarded, which was given for achievement in the field of three-dimensional imaging, endowed by Graham Saxby "in appreciation of the benefits of 50 years membership of The Society".

- 1998 – S. A. Benton
- 1999 – David Burder
- 2000 – Tung H. Jeong
- 2001 – Hans Bjelkhagen
- 2002 – Professor Nicholas Phillips
- 2003 – Jeff Blyth
- 2004 – Jonathan Ross
- 2005 – Robert Munday
- 2006 – Steve McGrew
- 2007 – Dayton Taylor
- 2008 – Not awarded
- 2009 – Martin Richardson
- 2010 – Trevor J. Maternaghan
- 2011 – David Huson
- 2012 – Brian May
- 2013 – Carl Jones
- 2015 – Masuji Suto

== Arms ==
Coat of arms of Royal Photographic Society

Crest
Upon a helm with a wreath Or and Gules issuant from an ancient crown Or the rim jewelled with sapphires and rubies Proper a demi-lynx also Proper holding between the forelegs an octagon Azure voided Or thereon an equilateral triangle the points couped silver Proper.
Escutcheon
Per pale Argent and Sable a sun in splendour per pale Sable and Or visaged on the dexter side Argent and on the sinister side sable with blue eyes proper and ensigned by an ancient crown Or rim jewelled with sapphires and rubies Proper.
Supporters
On either side a lion rampant guardant Or crowned with an ancient crown of the last the rim jewelled with sapphires and rubies Proper around the neck of each a riband Azure pendant there from a torteau that to the dexter charged with the capital letter V Or and that to the sinister with the capital letter A Or.

== See also ==
- List of European art awards
- British Institute of Professional Photography
