= George E. Smith =

American physicist (1930–2025)

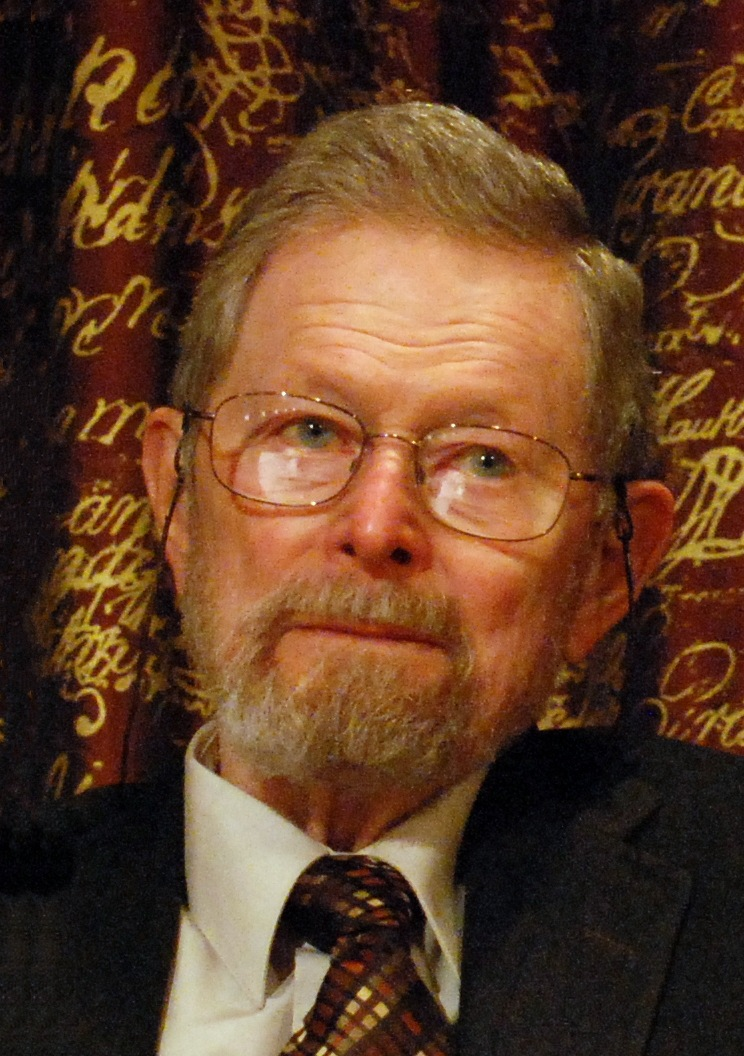
- Smith in 2009
- Born: George Elwood Smith; May 10, 1930; White Plains, New York, U.S.
- Died: May 28, 2025 (aged 95); Barnegat Township, New Jersey, U.S.
- Education: University of Pennsylvania (BS); University of Chicago (MS, PhD)
- Known for: Charge-coupled device
- Spouse: Janet Smith (m. 1955; died 1975)
- Children: 3
- Awards: Stuart Ballantine Medal (1973); IEEE Morris N. Liebmann Memorial Award (1974); C&C Prize (1999); Edwin H. Land Medal (2001); Charles Stark Draper Prize (2006); Nobel Prize in Physics (2009); Progress Medal (2015); Queen Elizabeth Prize for Engineering (2017)
- Scientific career
- Fields: Physics
- Workplaces: Bell Labs
- Thesis: The Anomalous Skin Effect in Bismuth (1959)
- Doctoral advisor: Andrew Werner Lawson

George Elwood Smith (May 10, 1930 – May 28, 2025) was an American applied physicist and a co-inventor of the charge-coupled device (CCD). Smith shared one half of the 2009 Nobel Prize in Physics with Willard Boyle "for the invention of an imaging semiconductor circuit - the CCD sensor."

== Education ==
George Elwood Smith was born on May 10, 1930, in White Plains, New York. After serving in the United States Navy for four years and taking courses at the University of Miami, Smith qualified in 1952 as a sophomore at the University of Pennsylvania, where he majored in physics and graduated with honors in 1955. He then became a graduate student of the University of Chicago, where he also worked as a teaching assistant. He received a Master of Science in 1956 and a Doctor of Philosophy (Ph.D.) in 1959. At the time, his eight-page thesis on the electronic properties of semimetals was the shortest Ph.D. thesis in the history of the university.

== Career ==
In 1959, Smith joined the Technical Staff of Bell Telephone Laboratories in Murray Hill, New Jersey, where he headed the Device Concepts Group from 1964 until his retirement in 1986. His work was done in the VLSI Device Department at Bell Labs.

In 1969, Smith and Willard Boyle, a fellow Bell Labs researcher, invented the charge-coupled device, for which they were awarded the 2009 Nobel Prize in Physics.

== Personal life and death ==
In 1955, Smith married his wife Janet, with whom he had three children. They often sailed on weekends until her death in 1975.

After retirement, Smith and his life partner sailed around the world for seventeen years, crossing the Atlantic Ocean twice and sailing through the Panama Canal. They returned to New Jersey in 2003. He resided in the Waretown section of Ocean Township, Ocean County, New Jersey.

Smith died at his home in Barnegat Township, New Jersey, on May 28, 2025, at the age of 95.

== Recognition ==
=== Awards ===
Year	Organization	Award	Citation	Ref.
1973	Franklin Institute	Stuart Ballantine Medal	"[For the] invention of charge-coupled device structure for imagesensing, serial memory and signal processing."	
1974	Institute of Electrical and Electronics Engineers	IEEE Morris N. Liebmann Memorial Award	"For the invention of the charge-coupled device and leadership in the field of MOS device physics."	
1999	NEC C&C Foundation	C&C Prize	"For the Invention of the Charge-Coupled Device (CCD)."	
2001	Optical Society of America; Society for Imaging Science and Technology	Edwin H. Land Medal	"For the invention and development of the charge-coupled device, a contribution that has had extraordinary impact on image creation and utilization."	
2006	National Academy of Engineering	Charles Stark Draper Prize	"For the invention of the Charge-Coupled Device (CCD), a light-sensitive component at the heart of digital cameras and other widely used imaging technologies."	
2009	Royal Swedish Academy of Sciences	Nobel Prize in Physics	"For the invention of an imaging semiconductor circuit - the CCD sensor."	
2015	Royal Photographic Society	Progress Medal	—	
2017	Queen Elizabeth Prize for Engineering Foundation	Queen Elizabeth Prize for Engineering	"For their [Smith, Eric Fossum, Nobukazu Teranishi, and Michael Tompsett] work on Digital Imaging Sensors."	

=== Memberships ===
Year	Organization	Type	Ref.
1983	National Academy of Engineering	Member	
