= Richard Schwartz (engineer) =

American aerospace engineer

- Born: New York City
- Education: Cooper Union; Pepperdine University
- Known for: aerospace engineering
- Spouse: Ardath Marie Schwartz

Richard Schwartz is an American aerospace engineer known for his work in satellite technologies which made possible the development of modern global positioning systems (GPS). He was a recipient of the 2019 Queen Elizabeth Prize for Engineering.

== Education and early life ==
Schwartz was born and raised in New York City, and attended high school at Brooklyn Tech. He graduated from Cooper Union with a degree in mechanical engineering in 1957, and eventually earned an MBA at Pepperdine University in 1972.

== Career and important contributions ==
After graduation in 1957, Schwartz went to work at the Rocketdyne division of North American Aviation, which eventually became part of Rockwell International. During his time at Rockwell he was involved in the development of rocket propulsion systems and the space shuttle Orbiter program, as well as other projects connected with NASA. Schwartz was Rockwell’s GPS Satellite Program Manager and was part of the team that provided the Block I satellites, i.e., the first GPS satellites.

He became president of Rocketdyne in 1983, but eventually left to become president of Hercules Aerospace Co. in 1989. He then served as president and CEO of Alliant Techsystem from 1995 to 1999.

== Awards and honors ==
Schwartz received a NASA Public Service Award in 1972, and was named to the Space Foundation's Space Technology Hall of Fame in 1998 in recognition of his contributions to GPS technology. He shared the 2019 Queen Elizabeth Prize for Engineering with Hugo FrueHauf, Bradford Parkinson, and James Spilker Jr. for their work in the development of GPS satellites which could endure radiation and remain in service for extremely long times.
