= Stanford Telecommunications =

Stanford Telecommunications, Inc., (STI) was an American engineering company engaged in technology development for satellite communications and navigation, in Santa Clara County, California. They were founded by James J. Spilker Jr. (1933–2019), P. Marshall Fitzgerald (1933–2013), and John W. Brownie in 1973, reincorporated in Delaware and went public in 1988, and were sold to several buyers (Intel, Newbridge/Alcatel, Dii/Flextronics, and ITT Industries) in 1999.

STI's founders were largely responsible for the design of the signals used in the GPS navigation system.

Founded and grown without any venture capital money, STI grew to 1300 employees before being sold.
