= Willard Boyle =

Canadian physicist (1924–2011)

Willard Boyle CC
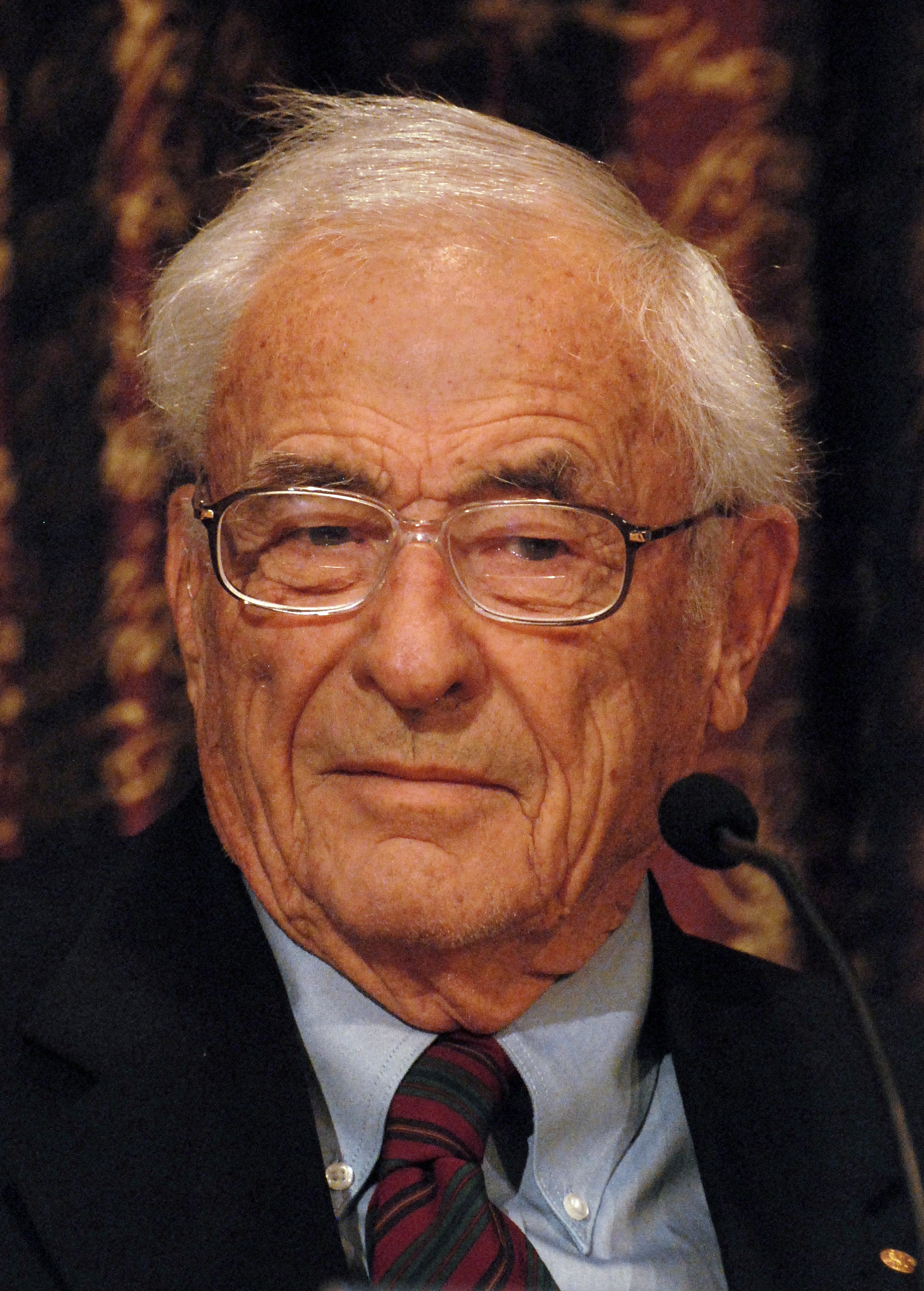
- Boyle in 2009
- Born: Willard Sterling Boyle; August 19, 1924; Amherst, Nova Scotia, Canada
- Died: May 7, 2011 (aged 86); Wallace, Nova Scotia, Canada
- Citizenship: Canada; United States
- Education: McGill University (BSc, MSc, PhD)
- Known for: Charge-coupled device; Ruby laser
- Spouse: Betty Joyce (m. 1946)
- Children: 4
- Awards: Stuart Ballantine Medal (1973); IEEE Morris N. Liebmann Memorial Award (1974); C&C Prize (1999); Edwin H. Land Medal (2001); Charles Stark Draper Prize (2006); Nobel Prize in Physics (2009)
- Scientific career
- Fields: Physics
- Workplaces: Royal Military College of Canada; Bell Labs
- Thesis: The construction of a Dempster type mass spectrometer: its use in the measurement of the diffusion rates of certain alkali metals in tungsten (1950)
- Doctoral advisor: H. Watson

Willard Sterling Boyle (August 19, 1924 – May 7, 2011) was a Canadian applied physicist who shared one half of the 2009 Nobel Prize in Physics with George E. Smith for their invention of the charge-coupled device.

== Early life and education ==
Willard Sterling Boyle was born on August 19, 1924, in Amherst, Nova Scotia, and lived in the nearby village of Wallace until the age of three, when he moved with his parents to northern Quebec, where his father worked as a doctor in the logging community. He was homeschooled by his mother, as the nearest school was 30 miles away. At age fourteen, he began his formal education at Lower Canada College in Montreal.

Boyle attended McGill University, but his education was interrupted in 1943, when he joined the Fleet Air Arm of the Royal Canadian Navy during World War II, training to land Spitfires on aircraft carriers. After the war ended, Boyle resumed his studies at McGill, where he received a Bachelor of Science in 1947 and a Master of Science the following year. In 1950, he received a Doctor of Philosophy in Physics for a thesis on mass spectrometry.

== Career ==
After receiving his doctorate, Boyle spent one year at Canada's Radiation Laboratory and two years teaching physics at the Royal Military College of Canada.

In 1953, Boyle joined Bell Telephone Laboratories, where he invented the first continuously operating ruby laser with Don Nelson in 1962. He was made Director of Space Science and Exploratory Studies at Bellcomm (a subsidiary of Bell Labs) in 1962, providing support for the Apollo program and helping to select lunar landing sites. He returned to Bell Labs in 1964, working on the development of integrated circuits. Boyle was Executive Director of Research in the Communications Sciences Division from 1975 until his retirement in 1979.

== Charge-coupled device ==
In 1969, Boyle and George E. Smith invented the charge-coupled device (CCD), for which they were jointly awarded the Nobel Prize in Physics in 2009. The CCD allowed NASA to send clear pictures to Earth back from space. It is also the technology that powers many digital cameras today. Smith said of their invention: "After making the first couple of imaging devices, we knew for certain that chemistry photography was dead." Eugene Gordon and Mike Tompsett, two now-retired colleagues from Bell Labs, claim that its application to photography was not invented by Boyle.

== Personal life and death ==
In 1946, Boyle married Betty Joyce, with whom he had two sons and two daughters.

During retirement, Boyle lived in Wallace, Nova Scotia, and in Lac Tremblant, Quebec. One of his hobbies was sailing his 33-foot boat.

Boyle had suffered from kidney disease, and died at a hospital in Wallace on May 7, 2011, at the age of 86.

== Recognition ==
=== Awards ===
Year	Organization	Award	Citation	Ref.
1973	Franklin Institute	Stuart Ballantine Medal	"[For the] invention of charge-coupled device structure for imagesensing, serial memory and signal processing."	
1974	Institute of Electrical and Electronics Engineers	IEEE Morris N. Liebmann Memorial Award	"For the invention of the charge-coupled device and leadership in the field of MOS device physics."	
1999	NEC C&C Foundation	C&C Prize	"For the Invention of the Charge-Coupled Device (CCD)."	
2001	Optical Society of America; Society for Imaging Science and Technology	Edwin H. Land Medal	"For the invention and development of the charge-coupled device, a contribution that has had extraordinary impact on image creation and utilization."	
2006	National Academy of Engineering	Charles Stark Draper Prize	"For the invention of the Charge-Coupled Device (CCD), a light-sensitive component at the heart of digital cameras and other widely used imaging technologies."	
2009	Royal Swedish Academy of Sciences	Nobel Prize in Physics	"For the invention of an imaging semiconductor circuit - the CCD sensor."	

=== Memberships ===
Year	Organization	Type	Ref.
1974	National Academy of Engineering	Member	

=== Honours ===
Year	Country	Honour	Ref.
2010	Canada	Companion of the Order of Canada	
