= Queen Elizabeth Prize for Engineering =

- Awarded for: Ground-breaking innovation in engineering which has been of global benefit to humanity
- Country: United Kingdom
- Presented by: The Queen Elizabeth Prize for Engineering Foundation
- Rewards: £500,000 and a trophy presented at Buckingham Palace
- First award: 2013; 13 years ago
- Winners: 6 prizes to 20 winners (as of 2022)
- Website: qeprize.org

The Queen Elizabeth Prize for Engineering, also known as the QEPrize, is a global prize for engineering and innovation. The prize was launched in 2012 by a cross-party group consisting of David Cameron, Nick Clegg, and Ed Miliband, then respectively Prime Minister, Deputy Prime Minister and Leader of the Opposition of the United Kingdom. The £500,000 prize, and 3D printed trophy, are awarded annually in the name of Queen Elizabeth II (the prize was biennial until 2021).

The prize is run by the Queen Elizabeth Prize for Engineering Foundation, a charitable company. The Foundation is chaired by Sir Patrick Vallance, with Yewande Akinola, John Hennessy, Anji Hunter, Robert Langer, Professor Sir Jim McDonald and Dame Anne Richards serving as trustees. The QEPrize is funded by donations from the following international companies: BAE Systems, BP, GSK, Hitachi Ltd., Jaguar Land Rover, National Grid, Nissan Motor Corporation, Shell, Siemens UK, Sony, Tata Consultancy Services, Tata Steel and Toshiba.

== The Prize ==
The Queen Elizabeth Prize for Engineering is awarded for engineering-led advances that are judged to be of tangible and widespread benefit to the public. The foundation invites nominations from the public, engineering and science academies, universities, research organisations, and commercial organisations from anywhere in the world; self-nomination is not permitted, and the prize is not awarded posthumously.

The judging panel works from the information provided in the nomination, comments from referees and any additional information required in order to establish which nomination most fully meets the following prize criteria:

1. What is it that this person has done (or up to five people have done) that is a ground-breaking innovation in engineering?
2. In what way has this innovation been of global benefit to humanity?
3. Is there anyone else who might claim to have had a pivotal role in this development?

The winner(s) of the QEPrize are announced every year by the Chairman of the QEPrize Foundation. In the first four prize cycles, this announcement was held at the Royal Academy of Engineering and was attended by members of the British Royal Family. The QEPrize award ceremony takes place in the same year as the announcement. The QEPrize trophy is designed by the winner of the Create the Trophy competition, presented to the winner(s) by a member of the Royal Family. In the first two prize cycles, the trophy was presented by the Queen. In subsequent cycles, the trophy has been presented by the King, formerly the Prince of Wales.

== Winners ==
Year	Invention	Recipient(s)	Nationality	Notes
2013	The Internet and the World Wide Web	Robert Kahn	United States	The inaugural prize was awarded to the five engineers responsible for the creation of the Internet and the World Wide Web. The announcement was made by Lord Browne of Madingley in the presence of Princess Anne on 18 March. The winners of the 2013 prize were: Robert Kahn (US), Vinton Cerf (US), and Louis Pouzin (France) for their contributions to the protocols that make up the fundamental architecture of the Internet.; Tim Berners-Lee (UK) for the creation of the World Wide Web.; Marc Andreessen (US) for the Mosaic web browser.; On 25 June the winners received their award from Queen Elizabeth II in a ceremony at Buckingham Palace in front of an audience that included the leaders of the UK's three main political parties, QEPrize judges, and a number of young engineers.
2013	The Internet and the World Wide Web	Vinton Cerf	United States	
2013	The Internet and the World Wide Web	Louis Pouzin	France	
2013	The Internet and the World Wide Web	Sir Tim Berners-Lee	United Kingdom	
2013	The Internet and the World Wide Web	Marc Andreessen	United States	
2015	Controlled release large molecule drug delivery	Robert Langer	United States	The 2015 prize was awarded to Robert Langer for his work in controlled-release large molecule drug delivery. The announcement was made by Lord Browne of Madingley in the presence of the Duke of York on 3 February. Langer, who made a speech at the announcement, said he was "proud and privileged to win the biggest engineering prize in the world". On 26 October, Langer received his award from Queen Elizabeth II in a ceremony at Buckingham Palace.
2017	Digital Imaging Sensors	George E. Smith	United States	The 2017 prize was awarded to the four engineers responsible for the creation of digital imaging sensors, an innovation that has facilitated advancements in medical treatments, science, communication, and entertainment. The announcement was made by Lord Browne of Madingley in the presence of the Princess Royal on 1 February. The winners of the 2017 prize were: George E. Smith (US) for the invention of the charge-coupled device (CCD) principle.; Michael Tompsett (UK) for the development of the CCD image sensor, including the invention of the imaging semiconductor circuit and the analogue-to-digital converter.; Nobukazu Teranishi (Japan) for the creation of the pinned photodiode (PPD).; Eric Fossum (US) for improving active pixel sensor with intra-pixel charge transfer.; On 6 December, the winners received their award from the Prince of Wales in a ceremony at Buckingham Palace.
2017	Digital Imaging Sensors	Michael Tompsett	United Kingdom	
2017	Digital Imaging Sensors	Nobukazu Teranishi	Japan	
2017	Digital Imaging Sensors	Eric Fossum	United States	
2019	Global Positioning System (GPS)	Bradford Parkinson	United States	The 2019 prize was awarded to the four engineers responsible for the development of the first truly global, satellite-based positioning system (GPS), whose combined efforts have enabled free, immediate access to accurate position and timing information for over 4 billion people around the world. Its applications range from navigation and disaster relief to climate monitoring and banking systems. The announcement was made by Lord Browne of Madingley in the presence of the Princess Royal on 12 February. The winners of the 2019 prize winners were: Bradford Parkinson (US) for leading the development, design, and testing of key GPS components.; James Spilker, Jr (US) for developing the L-band GPS civil signal structure using CDMA.; Hugo FrueHauf (US) for his instrumental role creating a highly accurate miniaturised atomic clock using a rubidium oscillator.; Richard Schwartz (US) for leading the design and development of the highly robust, long-lasting Block I satellites.; On 3 December, the winners received their award from the Prince of Wales in a ceremony at Buckingham Palace.
2019	Global Positioning System (GPS)	James Spilker, Jr	United States	
2019	Global Positioning System (GPS)	Hugo FrueHauf	United States	
2019	Global Positioning System (GPS)	Richard Schwartz	United States	
2021	LED Lighting	Nick Holonyak	United States	The 2021 prize was awarded to the five engineers responsible for the development of LED lighting – which forms the basis of all solid state lighting technology and is 75% more energy efficient than traditional bulbs, contributing to a global reduction of energy consumption. As a result of the COVID-19 pandemic, the announcement was made by Lord Browne of Madingley during a global livestream event. The winners of the 2021 prize were: Nick Holonyak (US) for developing the first (red) visible-light light emitting diode.; M. George Craford (US) for developing the yellow LED and pioneering the development of AlInGaP LEDs using metal organic chemical vapour deposition (MOCVD).; Russell Dupuis (US) for demonstrating that MOCVD could be applied to high-quality semiconductor thin films and devices to produce high performance LEDs.; Shuji Nakamura (USA) and Isamu Akasaki (Japan) for their development of blue and white LEDs.; On 8 December, the winners received their award from the Prince of Wales in a ceremony St James's Palace.
2021	LED Lighting	Isamu Akasaki	Japan	
2021	LED Lighting	M. George Craford	United States	
2021	LED Lighting	Shuji Nakamura	United States	
2021	LED Lighting	Russell Dupuis	United States	
2022	Neodymium-iron-boron magnet	Masato Sagawa	Japan	The 2022 prize was awarded to Masato Sagawa for the discovery, development and global commercialisation of the world's most powerful permanent magnet, the neodymium-iron-boron (Nd-Fe-B) magnet, which has been transformational in its contribution towards enabling cleaner, energy saving technologies.
2023	Passivated emitter rear contact (PERC) solar cells	Martin Green	Australia	The 2023 prize was awarded to the four engineers responsible for the invention and development of Passivated Emitter and Rear Cell (PERC) solar photovoltaic technology, which has underpinned recent exponential growth in high performance, low-cost solar electricity.: Martin Green set up the Solar Photovoltaic group at the University of New South Wales (UNSW) which demonstrated successive improvements in cell efficiency over a period of 30 years including the PERC cell and where the co-recipients of the prize studied as PHD students.; Andrew Blakers was the lead developer of the PERC cell as a commercial technology.; Aihua Wang with her husband Jianhua Zhao continued the development of PERC cells to achieve efficiencies of 25%.
2023	Passivated emitter rear contact (PERC) solar cells	Andrew Blakers	Australia	
2023	Passivated emitter rear contact (PERC) solar cells	Aihua Wang	China	
2023	Passivated emitter rear contact (PERC) solar cells	Jianhua Zhao	China	
2024	Modern wind power technology	Andrew Garrad CBE	United Kingdom	The 2024 Queen Elizabeth Prize for Engineering was awarded for... achievements in advancing the design, manufacture and deployment of high-performance wind turbines, allowing wind energy to make a substantial contribution to the world’s electricity generation. Over the last four decades, Garrad and Stiesdal have made groundbreaking engineering inputs, developing the early technology and maintaining their presence in leading positions as the industry has grown, enabling the world’s biggest rotating machines, which help drive progress towards a net-zero energy economy.
2024	Modern wind power technology	Henrik Stiesdal	Denmark	
2025	Modern Machine Learning	Yoshua Bengio	Canada	The 2025 QEPrize awarded to seven engineers who have made seminal contributions to the development of Modern Machine Learning, a core compenent of artificial intelligence (AI) advancements.: Yoshua Bengio, Geoffrey Hinton, John Hopfield and Yann LeCun have long championed artificial neural networks as an effective model for machine learning and this is now the dominant paradigm.; Jensen Huang and Bill Dally have led developments in the hardware platforms that underpin the operation of modern machine learning algorithms.; Fei-Fei Li established the importance of providing high quality datasets, both to benchmark progress and underpin the training of machine learning algorithms.
2025	Modern Machine Learning	Bill Dally	United States	
2025	Modern Machine Learning	Geoffrey Hinton	CanadaUnited Kingdom	
2025	Modern Machine Learning	John Hopfield	United States	
2025	Modern Machine Learning	Jensen Huang	United States	
2025	Modern Machine Learning	Yann LeCun	France	
2025	Modern Machine Learning	Fei-Fei Li	United States	
2026	Modern Neural Interfaces	Graeme Clark	Australia	for their groundbreaking work on cochlear implants, which convert sound into electrical signals that directly stimulate the auditory nerve.
2026	Modern Neural Interfaces	Erwin Hochmair	Austria	for their groundbreaking work on cochlear implants, which convert sound into electrical signals that directly stimulate the auditory nerve.
2026	Modern Neural Interfaces	Ingeborg Hochmair	Austria	for their groundbreaking work on cochlear implants, which convert sound into electrical signals that directly stimulate the auditory nerve.
2026	Modern Neural Interfaces	Blake S. Wilson	United States	for their groundbreaking work on cochlear implants, which convert sound into electrical signals that directly stimulate the auditory nerve.
2026	Modern Neural Interfaces	John Donoghue	United States	for his foundational leadership in advancing brain–computer interfaces, creating systems that decode neural activity to restore movement and communication.
2026	Modern Neural Interfaces	Alim Louis Benabid	France	for pioneering modern deep brain stimulation, a therapy that alleviates symptoms of neurological movement disorders such as Parkinson’s disease.
2026	Modern Neural Interfaces	Pierre Pollak	France	for pioneering modern deep brain stimulation, a therapy that alleviates symptoms of neurological movement disorders such as Parkinson’s disease.
2026	Modern Neural Interfaces	Jocelyne Bloch	Switzerland	for their development of electronic spinal stimulation technology, which reactivates neural circuits controlling locomotion.
2026	Modern Neural Interfaces	Grégoire Courtine	France	for their development of electronic spinal stimulation technology, which reactivates neural circuits controlling locomotion.

External videos
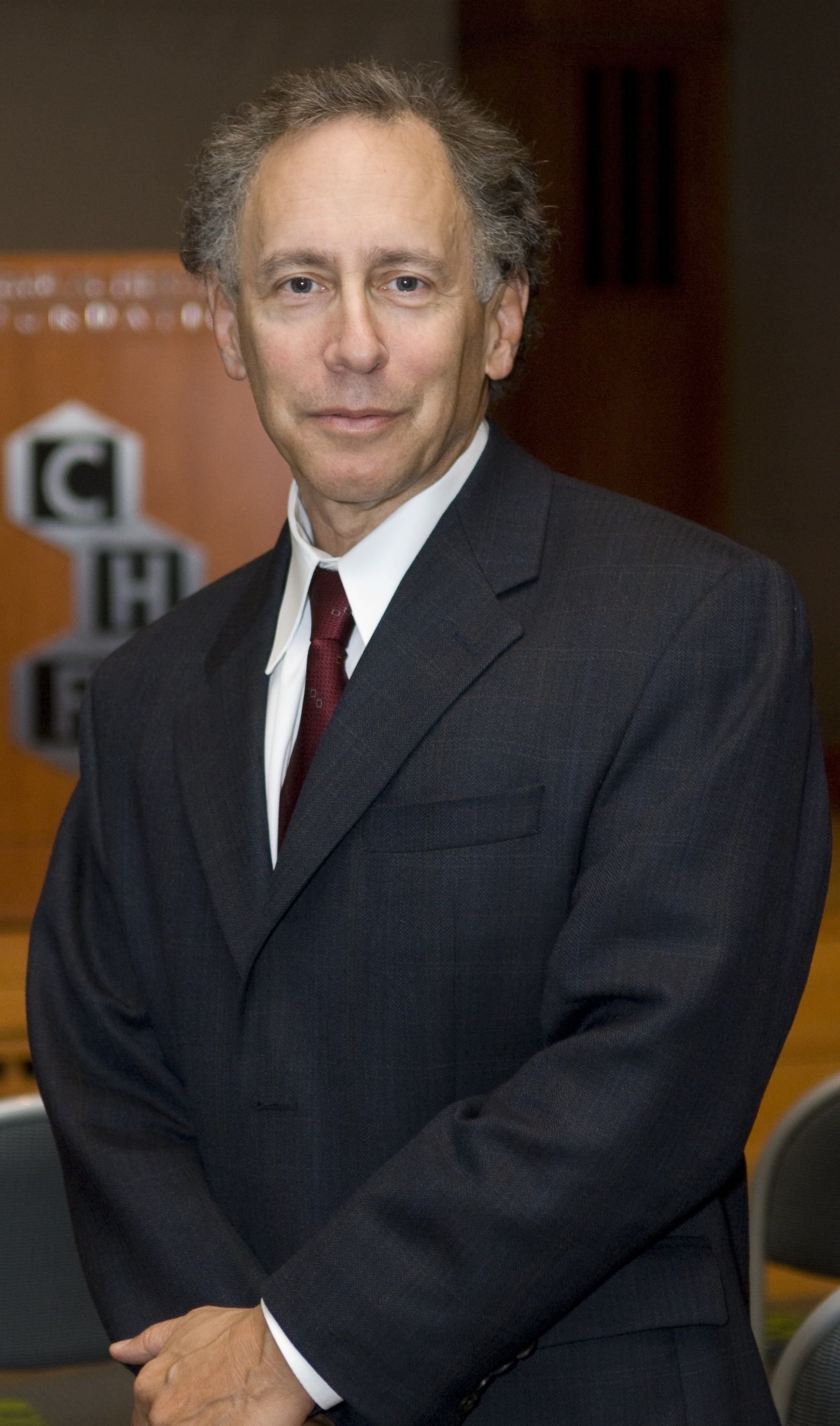
- Hundreds of millions of people a year across the world benefit from the technologies that rest on the work of Robert Langer., Queen Elizabeth Prize for Engineering 2015

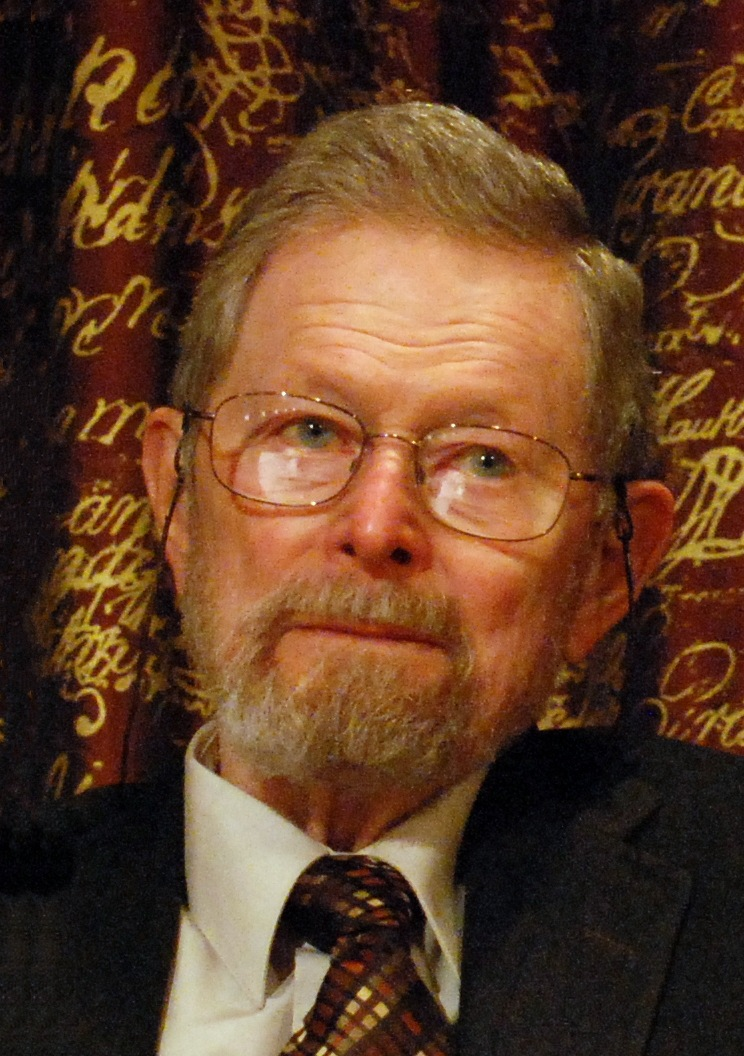
CCD inventor:
George Smith

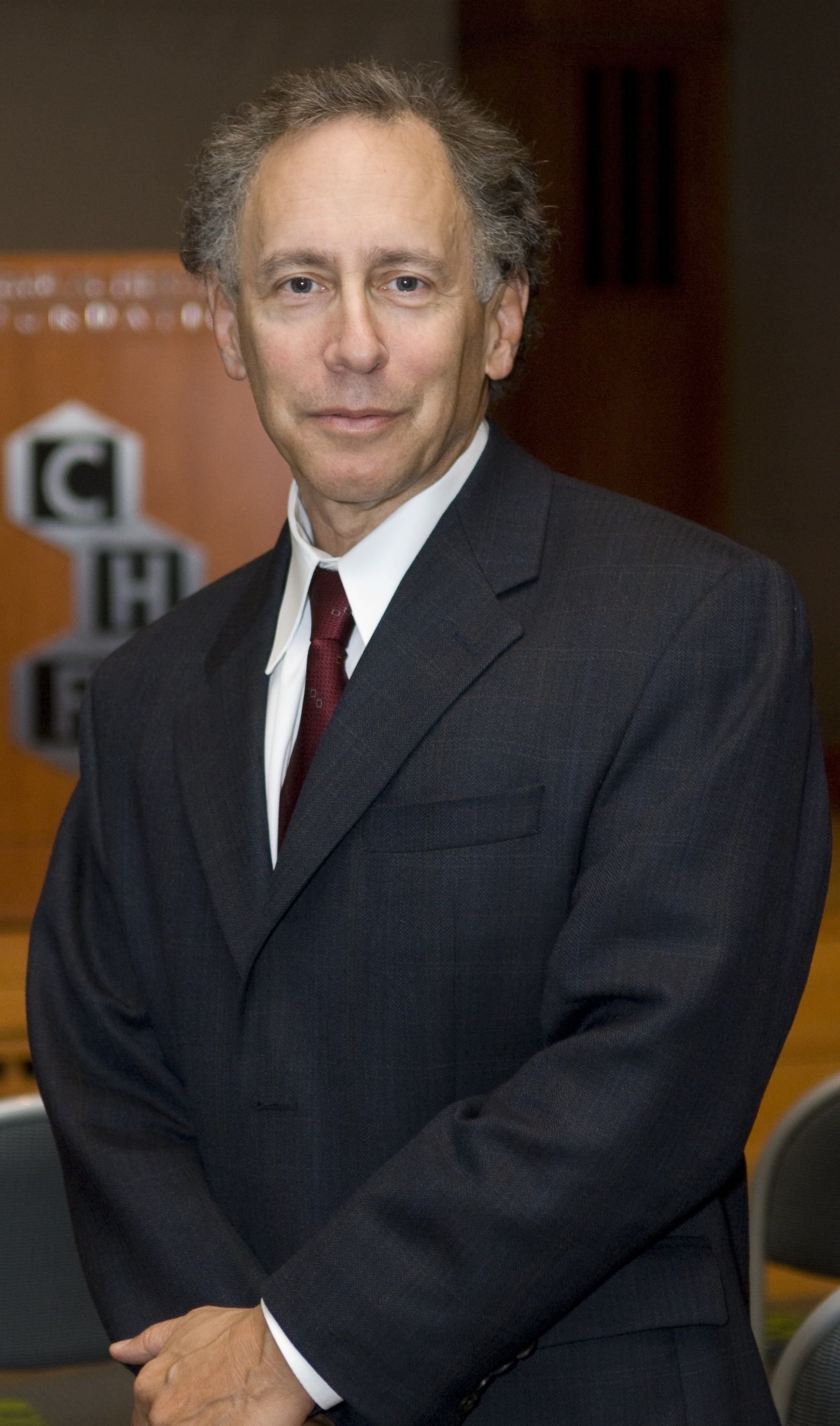
Molecule drug delivery: Robert Langer

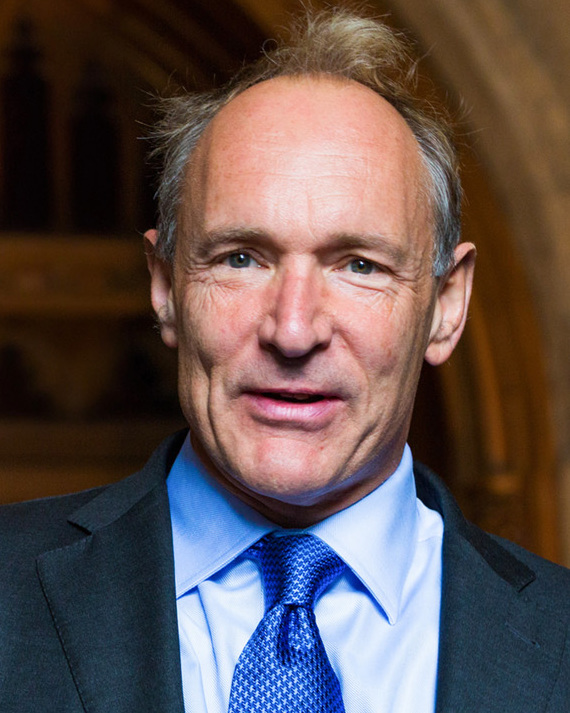
World Wide Web creator: Sir Tim Berners-Lee

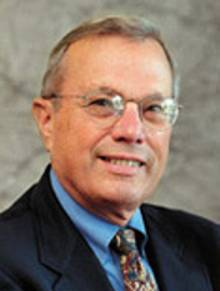
"Father of GPS": Bradford Parkinson

== Judging panel ==
In 2026, the judges for the Queen Elizabeth Prize for Engineering were: Dr Sangeeta Bhatia, Professor Brito Cruz, Dr Abdigani Diriye, Professor Orla Feely, Professor Nick Jennings, Dr Tsu-Jae Liu, Professor Teck Seng Low, Ilya Espino de Marotta, Dr Raghunath Anant Mashelkar, Professor Tatsuya Okubo, Professor Tuula Teeri, and Professor Viola Vogel.

The Chair of Judges include: Lord Alec Broers (2013–2015), Sir Christopher Snowden (2015–2021) and Professor Dame Lynn Gladden (2022–present).

== QEPrize Ambassador Network ==
The QEPrize Ambassador Network is an international network that brings together the best and brightest early-career engineers from all fields around the world, who work to inspire the next generation to take up the challenges of the future. QEPrize ambassadors act as evangelists for engineering, engaging with teachers, parents, school children, politicians, and journalists about their work and why engineering is such an important profession. The Ambassador Network became a global community in 2016.

== The Engineers' Gallery in the Science Museum ==
The QEPrize is a major funder of the Engineers' Gallery which opened in June 2023 in the Science Museum, London. The gallery features all QEPrize winners arranged around the themes of Bodies, Lives, Communications and Creating.

== Create the Trophy competition ==
The QEPrize trophy is designed by the winner of the Create the Trophy competition which, like the prize itself, runs annually. The competition is open to those aged between 14 and 24, and is intended to encourage young people to develop 3D design skills. Entries are submitted online through an app.

=== Winners ===
2013: Jennifer Leggett, 17. Leggett was invited to spend the day with designer Thomas Heatherwick before the design was finalised.

2015: Euan Fairholm, 20, a mechanical engineering student at The University of Glasgow. His design, "The Golden Crown", was developed into a final form by BAE Systems and presented to Dr Robert Langer, the winner of the 2015 QEPrize.

2017: Samuel Bentley, 15, from Wales. His design was 3D printed by BAE Systems, and presented to the 2017 QEPrize winners at Buckingham Palace.

2019: Jack Jiang, 16, from Hong Kong.

2021: Hannah Goldsmith, 20, from the United Kingdom.

2022: Anshika Agarwal, 17, from India.

2023: Anja Brandl, from Switzerland.

2024: Sunil Thakker, from India.

2025: Prerak Bothra, from India.

2026: Kayla Taqiya, from Indonesia.

== See also ==
- Donald Davies – independently invented packet switching and modern data communication
- List of engineering awards
