= Michael Francis Tompsett =

Michael Tompsett (born 1939) is an English-born physicist, engineer, and inventor, and the founder director of the US software company TheraManager. He is a former researcher at the English Electric Valve Company, who later moved to Bell Labs in the United States. Tompsett designed and built the first ever video camera with a solid-state (CCD) sensor. Tompsett received the Queen Elizabeth Prize for Engineering in 2017, with Eric Fossum, George Smith, and Nobukazu Teranishi. Tompsett has also received two other lifetime awards; the New Jersey Inventors Hall of Fame 2010 Pioneer Award, and the 2012 IEEE Edison Medal. The thermal-imaging camera tube developed from his invention also earned a Queen's Award in 1987.

Tompsett is known particularly for his work on infrared imagers and CCD imagers. He pioneered compact, low power, high performance, and low cost solid-state infrared imagers, CCD imagers, and digital cameras and made contributions in several fields with patents and publications over an extended period of time. He is credited with applying the principle behind the charge-coupled device to invent the CCD imager, used in devices such as digital cameras.

== Education and career ==
He studied physics at the University of Cambridge and also completed an engineering PhD there (1962–66).

Tompsett built a reflection high-energy electron diffraction (RHEED) system to study surfaces. While at English Electric Valve (EEV), he built the first ultra-high-vacuum RHEED system with in-situ deposition to study the structures of thin-films of lead oxide as they were deposited. This understanding was needed to make Plumbicon television camera-tubes. He consulted with VacGen (now VG Scienta) to make a commercial system, the first of which was sold to IBM Labs.

In 1968 while still at EEV, Tompsett invented the un-cooled Pyro-electric thermal-imaging camera tube. He also invented a solid-state version, which is now the basis for thermal imagers made today. These imagers are used with great impact by the military for night-vision, by firefighters to see through smoke, and for other search-and-rescue and civilian uses worldwide.

In 1969, he moved to New Jersey with his wife, and joined AT&T Bell Telephone Laboratories, where he helped to make the first charge-coupled device (CCD), and led development of CCDs. He exploited the device’s potential for digital imaging and, together with his team, developed a series of CCD cameras and produced the first pixel CCD colour image in 1972. It was a picture of his wife and made the cover of Electronics Magazine.

In 1979, he pioneered the development of the first, integrated circuit, data modem using Metal Oxide Semiconductor (MOSFET) silicon switched-capacitor filters, and a patented Automatic Gain Control circuit. This was the first mixed analog-digital integrated circuit/system to go into manufacture. This technology has now grown into a multibillion-dollar industry. In the 1980s Tompsett applied himself to finding a solution to a major challenge to reduce the size, power, and cost of digitizing video signals from imagers and scanners. He invented an integrated, two-step recycling video analog-digital converter.

After taking early retirement from Bell Labs in 1989, he joined the US Army as Director of Electron Device Research for six years. In 2010 the US Government awarded him the National Medal of Technology and Innovation, its highest honor for engineers and inventors. In 2016, he was elected a member of the National Academy of Engineering for the design and development of the first charge-coupled device imagers.

== Technical accomplishments ==
Tompsett made technological contributions in several different specialty areas including materials science, night vision, charge-coupled devices, and integrated circuit design over a lifetime of work. He is responsible for significant invention, development, and leadership of several socially beneficial enabling technologies in use today. These include the in-situ monitoring of deposited epitaxial films, un-cooled night-vision thermal imaging camera tubes, un-cooled solid-state thermal imagers, CCD imagers and CCD cameras, MOS mixed analog-digital integrated systems, and integrated video analog-digital converters.

== Awards and honors ==
- Tompsett was elected Fellow of the Institution of Electrical and Electronic Engineers (IEEE) in 1987.
- Tompsett received the 2010 Pioneer Lifetime Award from the New Jersey Inventors Hall of Fame.
- Tompsett received the National Medal of Technology and Innovation, the highest honor bestowed by the United States government on US engineers and inventors presented by President Obama in 2011.
- Tompsett received the IEEE Edison Medal in 2012.
- Tompsett received the Queen Elizabeth Prize for Engineering presented by Prince Charles in 2017.
- Tompsett received The Progress Medal from the Royal Photographic Society (RPS) in 2017.
- Tompsett received a Technology and Engineering Emmy Award from the National Academy of Television Arts and Sciences in 2020.

== Bibliography ==
- "Charge transfer imaging devices", U.S. Patent 4,085,456, priority date March 16, 1971; filing date August 30, 1972; publication date April 18, 1978 (retrieved December 23, 2009).
