= Nobukazu Teranishi =

Japanese engineer (born 1953)

Nobukazu Teranishi (寺西 信一, Teranishi Nobukazu; born 1953) is a Japanese engineer who researches image sensors, and is known for inventing the pinned photodiode, an important component of modern digital cameras. He was one of four recipients of the 2017 Queen Elizabeth Prize for Engineering. He worked at NEC Corporation (1978–2000) and Panasonic Corporation (2000–13). As of 2018, he is a professor at the University of Hyogo and at Shizuoka University.

== Education ==
Teranishi studied physics at the University of Tokyo, gaining B.S. (1976) and M.S. degrees (1978) in the subject.

== Career and research ==
He joined NEC Corporation in 1978, remaining there until 2000, when he moved to Panasonic Corporation (2000–13). In 2013, he moved to academia, becoming a professor at the University of Hyogo and at Shizuoka University in Japan, where he remains as of 2018.

At NEC Corporation, Teranishi invented the pinned photodiode in 1980; the device was named in 1984. The pinned photodiode is a development of the charge-coupled device (CCD) imager. It has improved efficiency compared with the CCD, resulting in reduced pixel size and higher image resolution. It remains an important component of digital camera technology.

== Awards, honours and societies ==
Teranishi's awards include medals from the British Royal Photographic Society (2010) and the Photographic Society of America (2011), the Yamazaki Teiichi Award (2013), the ITE Niwa-Takayanagi Lifetime Achievement Award (2013) and the J.J. Ebers Award of the Institute of Electrical and Electronics Engineers (IEEE; 2013). He received the Queen Elizabeth Prize for Engineering in 2017, with Michael Tompsett, Eric Fossum and George Smith.

He is a fellow of the IEEE, and of the Institute of Image Information and Television Engineers (2003). He has edited three special issues of IEEE Transactions on Electron Devices. In 2006, he was one of the founders of the International Image Sensor Society, and served as its president in 2018.

== Selected publications ==
- Teranishi, Nobuzaku; Kohono, A.; Ishihara, Yasuo; Oda, E.; Arai, K. (13–15 December 1982). "No image lag photodiode structure in the interline CCD image sensor". 1982 International Electron Devices Meeting, Proceedings. IEEE. pp. 324–327. doi:10.1109/IEDM.1982.190285. S2CID 44669969.
- U.S. Patent 4,484,210: Solid-state imaging device having a reduced image lag (priority 1980-09-05)
