= Eric Fossum =

American electrical engineer

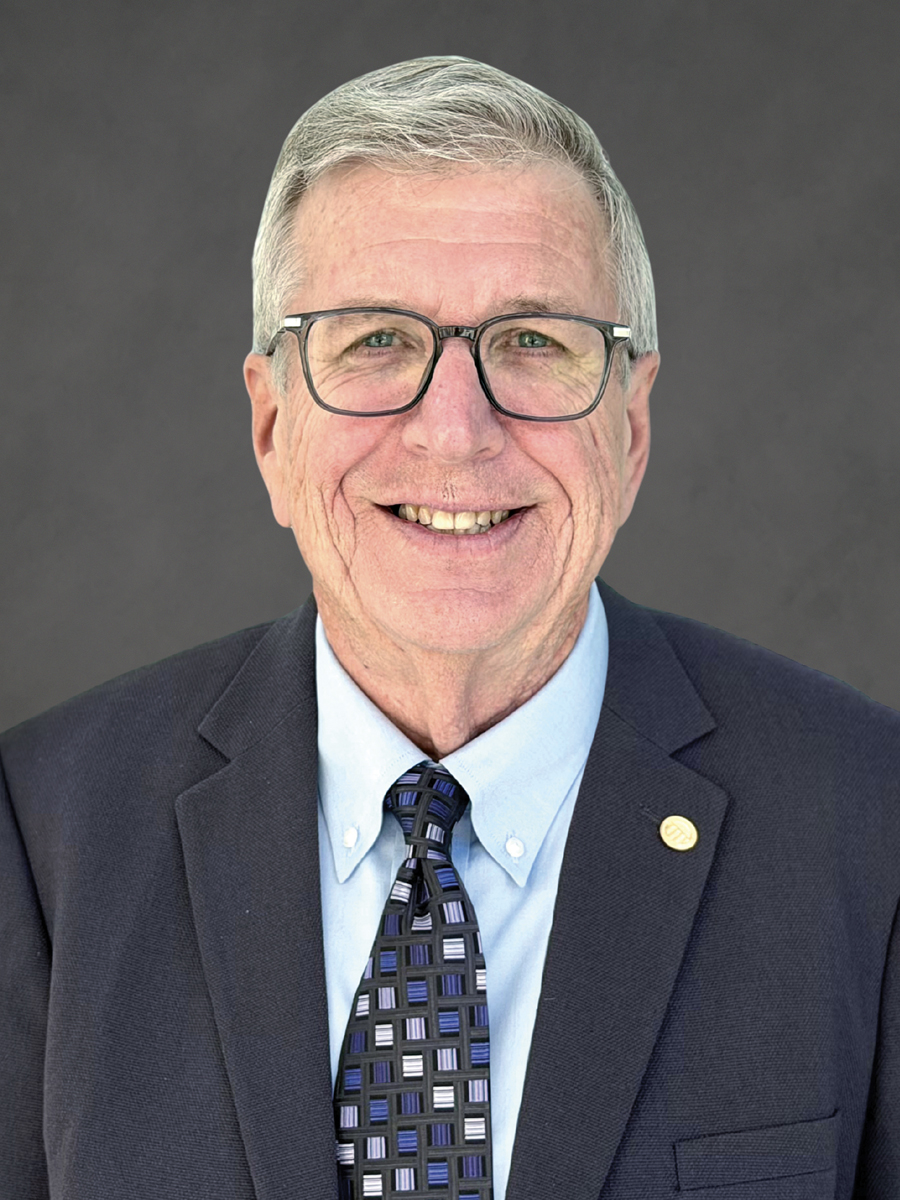
Eric Fossum

Eric R. Fossum (born October 17, 1957) is an American engineer. Currently, he is a professor at Thayer School of Engineering in Dartmouth College.

== Early life and education ==
Fossum was born and raised in Simsbury, Connecticut. He graduated from Simsbury High School. He received his B.S. in engineering from Trinity College in 1979, and his Ph.D. in electrical engineering from Yale University in 1984.

== Career ==
=== Academic career ===
During the later years of his doctoral studies, Fossum served as an acting instructor at Yale University. After graduating Yale, Fossum became a member of the Electrical Engineering faculty at Columbia University from 1984 to 1990. At Columbia University, Fossum performed research on CCD focal-plane image processing and high speed III-V CCDs. In 1990, Fossum joined the NASA Jet Propulsion Laboratory, California Institute of Technology to manage JPL's image sensor and focal-plane technology research and advanced development.

He joined the Thayer School of Engineering at Dartmouth as a professor in 2010 to perform research on Quanta Image Sensors (QIS).

=== Professional career ===
In 1995 Fossum and Sabrina Kemeny co-founded Photobit Corporation with 3 other co-founders to commercialize the technology. Fossum left JPL to join Photobit full-time in 1996. In late 2001, Micron Technology Inc. acquired Photobit Corp. and Fossum was named a Senior Micron Fellow; he remained with Micron and was let go after about a year. In 2005, he joined SiWave Inc., a developer of MEMS technology for mobile phone handsets, as CEO. SiWave was renamed Siimpel and grew substantially before his departure in 2007. During his tenure, the company raised multiple rounds of venture financing prior to his departure. Severely damaged Siimpel was acquired for an asset only acquisition for $15M. In 1986, he co-founded the IEEE Workshop on CCDs, now known as the International Image Sensor Workshop (IISW). In 2007, with Nobukazu Teranishi and Albert Theuwissen, he co-founded and was the first President of the International Image Sensor Society (IISS) which operates the IISW.

=== Invention ===
During the early 1990s, a JPL research team that included Fossum, Sunetra Mendis, and Sabrina E. Kemeny developed modifications to existing CMOS active-pixel sensor (APS) designs. The team integrated Nobukazu Teranishi’s pinned photodiode concept into on-chip camera system designs. They also included other already invented technologies by other people, such as a sample and hold in the sensor chip.Based on these changes and additions, the JPL team made their first image sensor. The JPL-developed sensor incorporated intra-pixel charge transfer within a CMOS architecture, building on prior APS and pinned photodiode work developed elsewhere. In 1994, the JPL image sensor team proposed an improvement to the CMOS sensor: the integration of the pinned photodiode (PPD). A CMOS sensor with PPD technology was first fabricated in 1995 by a joint JPL and Kodak team that included Fossum along with P.P.K. Lee, R.C. Gee, R.M. Guidash and T.H. Lee. Further refinements to the CMOS sensor with PPD technology between 1997 and 2003 led to CMOS sensors achieve imaging performance on par with CCD sensors, and later exceeding CCD sensors.

== Research ==
Fossum’s research centers on solid-state imaging technologies, with major contributions spanning the invention, development, and advancement of semiconductor image sensors. His significant achievement is the invention of the complementary metal–oxide–semiconductor (CMOS) active pixel image sensor at NASA’s Jet Propulsion Laboratory in the early 1990s. This technology integrated light detection, amplification, and readout onto a single chip, enabling smaller, lower-power, and lower-cost imaging systems, and has since become the dominant architecture in devices such as smartphones, digital cameras, and automotive imaging systems.

Building on this work, Fossum has led the development of the quanta image sensor (QIS), a photon-counting imaging paradigm designed to detect individual photons under extremely low-light conditions. His research on QIS includes studies on device architecture, noise characteristics, and performance limits, contributing to next-generation imaging capabilities.

In addition, Fossum has conducted research on high-speed and low-noise imaging systems, including ultra-fast CMOS sensors capable of capturing millions of frames per second, as well as computational imaging and super-resolution techniques.

== Awards ==
Fossum has authored numerous peer-reviewed publications and holds a large portfolio of U.S. patents related to image sensor technology. He is a Fellow of the IEEE and Optica.

- Yale's Becton Prize in 1984
- IBM Faculty Development Award in 1984
- National Science Foundation Presidential Young Investigator Award in 1986, the JPL Lew Allen Award for Excellence in 1992
- NASA Exceptional Achievement Medal in 1996
- Induction into the US Space Foundation Space Technology Hall of Fame in 1999
- Photographic Society of America Progress Medal in 2003.
- Royal Photographic Society Progress Medal in 2004.
- IEEE Andrew S. Grove Award in 2009
- Inventor of the Year by the New York Intellectual Property Law Association in 2010
- Induction into the National Inventors Hall of Fame in 2011.
- Elected as a Charter Fellow of the National Academy of Inventors in 2012.
- Elected as a Member of the National Academy of Engineering in 2013.
- Received the Doctor of Science honoris causa from Trinity College (Connecticut) in 2014.
- Received 2017 Queen Elizabeth Prize for Engineering (shared with 3 people)
- OSA/IS&T Edwin H. Land Medal in 2020.
- National Academy of Television Arts and Sciences Technology and Engineering Emmy Award in 2020
- National Medal of Technology and Innovation in 2025.
- Charles Stark Draper Prize for Engineering in 2026
- IEEE Jun-ichi Nishizawa Medal in 2026
