= Werner Urland =

German chemist (born 1944)

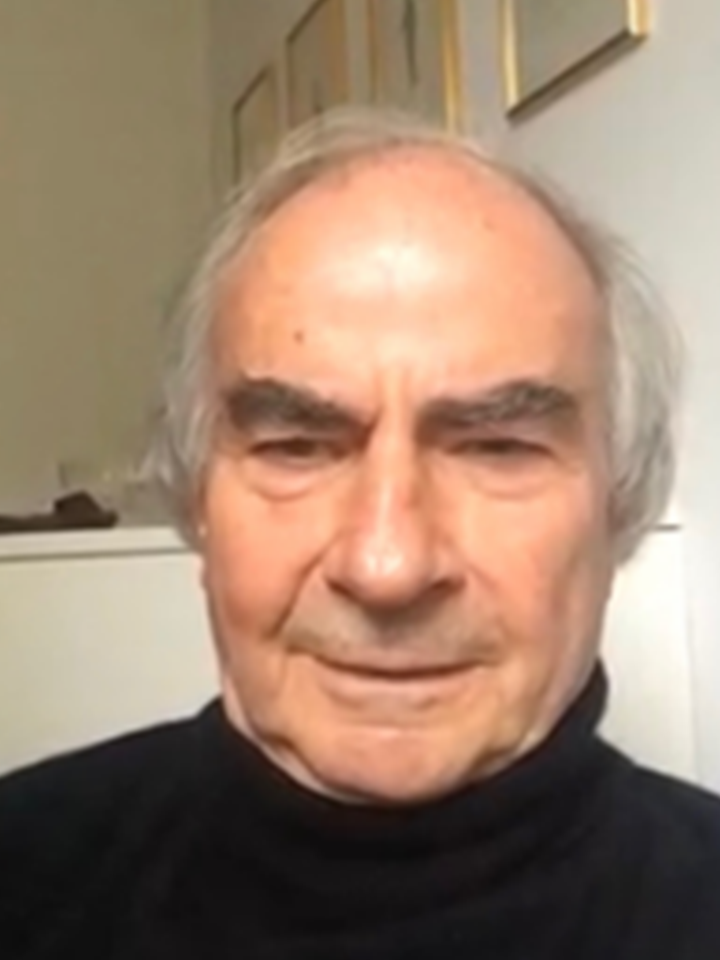
- Werner Urland
- Born: 13 April 1944
- Website: www.life-and-science-institute.com

Werner Urland (born 13 April 1944) is a German chemist whose name is imprinted in the pioneering implementation of the Angular Overlap Model (AOM: a specific paradigm for accounting metal ions in complexes or crystals) for the interpretation of optical and magnetic properties of rare-earth coordination compounds. This approach receives a renewed value in the context of the vogue around the lanthanide-based new materials, such as achieving magnets at molecular scale, or designing new phosphor materials.

== Biography ==
Werner Urland was born in Berlin on 13 April 1944. Between 1963 and 1968 he studied and graduated in chemistry in Giessen, Germany. The interval 1968-1971 was dedicated to the work of a doctoral thesis, under the supervision of Professor R. Hoppe, on ternary oxides of noble metals. The PhD stage incorporated a scholarship at University College in London, in the group of Dr. Malcolm Gerloch under the supervision of Professor Lord Jack Lewis (Jack Lewis, Baron Lewis of Newnham, where the acquaintance with the magnetic properties and specific models of coordination compounds had defined a turning point in his career. The following post-doctoral stage (1971-1974) in preparative solid-state chemistry and the return to England, at Cambridge, in the theory group directed by Prof. A. D. Buckingham, contoured an original composition of scientific interests, at the confluence of applied chemistry with the theoretical insight, aiming for understanding and predicting useful properties. Assimilating the different formation sources, Werner Urland contoured his original perspective in the magnetochemistry of rare earth compounds, the domain delineated by his habilitation treatise (1975-1980).

Between 1982 and 1986 he occupied a research position at the Max Planck Institute for Solid State Research in Stuttgart. Since 1986 he has been appointed professor in Hanover, where he acted till his retirement in 2007, on a chair dedicated to special topics of inorganic chemistry. In 1996 he declined an invitation to occupy a position as professor of inorganic chemistry at the University of Vienna. Since 2011, Werner Urland occupies a senior researcher position on grants, in the group of theoretical and computational chemistry of Professor Claude Daul, at University of Fribourg, Switzerland. Presently, Werner Urland is dealing with setting up an institute in Muralto/Locarno, Switzerland, with the help of the "Fondazione Sciaroni", dedicated to theoretical approach of material sciences and property design, thus supporting experimental work by universities and industries.

== Activity ==
=== Preparative solid state and coordination chemistry ===
In the branch dedicated to solid state chemistry, Werner Urland et al. synthesized and characterized structurally, by X-ray crystallography, several lanthanide-chalcogenide systems with unusual anionic structures, such as PrSe_{2}, PrSe_{1.9−x}, CeSe_{1.9−x} NdSe_{1.9} or more complex compositions, such as chalcogenide-silicates like Nd_{2}SeSiO_{4} like M_{4}X_{3} [Si_{2}O_{7}] (M = Ce - Er; X = S, Se) The crystal structures of prototypic chalcogenides of trivalent lanthanides, like Ln_{2}Se_{3} (Ln=Sm, Tb, Ho) were resolved., treating also their polymorphic manifestations and the electronic structure. Other solid phase systems such as lanthanide aluminium halides, LnAl_{3}X_{12} (with Ln = lanthanide trivalent ions in the La-Ho series and X= Cl, Br) were considered as synthetic and structural problems. Another area of Werner Urland's research was contoured around the special properties of condensed systems, such as superconductivity of mixed oxide compounds, or ionic conductivity and dynamics of sodium and lanthanide ions in crystals like Na^{+}/Ln^{3+}-ß"-Al_{2}O_{3} The same systems received attention also in the respect of their magnetic properties, in relation with the determinant structural factors. Among other approached special properties, one may mention the treatment of bipolaron absorption in Ba_{1−x}K_{x}BiO_{3} and Ba_{0.6}K_{0.4−x}BiO_{3} materials.

=== Modelling breakthroughs ===
After a brief apprenticeship in applying standard versions of ligand field modelling to transition metal complexes, tackling single-crystal polarized spectra and magnetic anisotropy of Ni(II) and Co(II) complexes in the less usual five-coordination states, Werner Urland conceived his own "trademark" devising a ligand-field potential for f electrons in the frame of Angular Overlap Model. Immediate applications clarified the meaning of the parameters, taking rare-earth hydroxides and chlorides as case studies. Many papers developed in this domain were single authored, marking the original perspective of Werner Urland. Briefly, describing the situation of ligand field theory, practically equivalent to crystal field theory pointing that this method is more popular, often invoked in qualitative respects, for transition metal systems (coordination and solid phase compounds) while for f-elements (lanthanide and actinide compounds) it is regarded as a rather specialized field, due to somewhat more complicated technical stances. A conceptual drawback is the lack of chemical intuitiveness of the parameters of classical ligand field theories. There are several conventions, such as Wybourne or Stevens parameterizations An alternate offer was identified in the Angular Overlap Model basically developed for d-type transition metal systems It is the merit of Werner Urland for stating the AOM version for f-type compounds, advocating for it by systematic applications acting as proof for the validity of this approach. The theoretical activity was complemented by involvement in synthetic coordination chemistry, producing new coordination compounds taken as relevant new case studies for ligand field interpretation of magnetic properties. A series consisting in individual octahedral units [LnCl_{6}]^{3−}, is interesting by the intrinsic simplicity of these complexes, once is known that lanthanide complexes are usually adopting higher coordination numbers, the hexa-coordination being enforced mostly by the doping regime, in solid lattices, such as elpasolites (a variety of Halide minerals with ABM_{2}X_{3}stoichiometry). The magnetic properties of [LnCl_{6}]^{3−} complexes (with pyridinium counter ions) were analysed in the non-trivial details of the causal role of the ligand field effects. In the same spirit, a detailed attention was devoted to the relatively simple lanthanide pentakis nitrato complexes, starting from the synthesis stage continued into the instrumental and theoretical characterization. The Electron paramagnetic resonance (EPR) spectra of the pentakis nitrato ytterbate(III), [Yb(NO_{3})_{5}]^{2−} was recorded and modelled, the ligand field treatment being based also on advanced neutron spectroscopy measurements. A peculiar manifestation, discovered in the light of the developed methodologies, was the first report of level crossing in ligand field diagrams, tuned by external pressure. A systematic attention was devoted to the magnetism determined by lanthanide ions in solid compounds like the ternary oxides, CsLnO_{2} or Cs_{2}MLnX_{6} elpasolite type systems, with various combination of (M = Na, K, Rb) alkaline metal ions and (X=F, Cl, Br) halides, for several Ln(III) rare earth cases. Werner Urland proved the ligand field as the determinant for the pattern of magnetic susceptibility dependences on temperature, often mistakenly attributed to inter-center exchange coupling. A distinct branch of investigation concerned the unusual ferromagnetic Gd(III)-Gd(III) exchange coupling recorded in newly synthesized homo-polynuclear complexes of gadolinium with various carboxylates (acetate, fluoro- and chloro- substituted acetate) as bridging ligand.

== Recent advances ==
Following the retirement in 2007 from Hannover professorship, Werner Urland resumed the scientific activity as guest senior researcher in the group of Professor Claude Daul at University of Fribourg (Switzerland), where he proposed a topic related to the so-called "Warm-White Light", namely the improvement of blue-type light-emitting diodes (LEDs) towards the better resemblance to the sunlight spectrum by coating with appropriate phosphors based on lanthanide doped materials. The topic represents a hot relevance in the context of the trends of eliminating traditional incandescent light bulbs, for the sake of energy saving new technologies . This technological challenge is underlined by the award of the 2014 Nobel Prize in Physics "for the invention of efficient blue light-emitting diodes, which has enabled bright and energy-saving white light sources" to Shuji Nakamura, Isamu Akasaki and Hiroshi Amano and by the declaration of 2015 as International Year of Light and Light-based Technologies, (IYL 2015). Hybridizing Werner's Urland expertise in experimental and theoretical aspects of rare earth materials with a computation and analysis methodology due to C. Daul and M. Atanasov, altogether with methodological knowledge of external collaborators of the group, a series of works was produced, dealing with the analysis and prediction form first principles of the key factors in the luminescence of relevant lanthanide ions in various environments. The modelling is based on a set of algorithmic steps abbreviated as LFDFT, consisting in non-routine calculations in the frame of density functional theory (DFT) followed by the analysis in the frame of ligand field theory. The issue of first principles calculations on rare-earth systems is non-trivial, because of special features of the f-shell, such as the shielded and weakly interacting nature, that poses technical and conceptual difficulties, in relation to modern methods of quantum chemistry. The specific problem of the modelling the luminescence of rare-earth systems called the need of extending the ligand field phenomenology, from its one-shell status (dedicated to d or f electrons) to a two-shell Hamiltonian, comprising simultaneously the d and f shells, because the involved optical transitions have inter-shell nature. Also recently, Werner Urland, entered the terrain of actinide chemistry, explaining intriguing magnetic behaviour due strong ligand field on uranium(IV) ions in thiophosphates and silicates. The whole deal underlines the validity and renewed value of Werner Urland's early ideas about the theoretical and practical aspects emerging from the chemistry and physics of f-elements.
