= List of Nobel laureates by university affiliation =

The following list shows the university affiliations of individual winners of the Nobel Prize since 1901 and the Nobel Memorial Prize in Economic Sciences since 1969. The affiliations are those at the time of the Nobel Prize announcement. Universities all adopt different criteria to claim Nobel affiliates. The Los Angeles Times has found some generous and others more stringent: for instance, the University of California, Berkeley, only counts current and retired faculty members, while the University of Chicago includes students and visiting professors as well. Inconsistency thus may occur between those counts and what this list states.

== Universities with multiple Nobel laureates ==
Number of Nobel laureates by university
University	Number of Nobel laureates
Harvard University	29
Massachusetts Institute of Technology	25
Stanford University	24
University of California, Berkeley	23
California Institute of Technology	20
University of Chicago	20
Columbia University	19
University of Cambridge	18
Princeton University	18
Howard Hughes Medical Institute	15
Rockefeller University	13
University of Oxford	10
MRC Laboratory of Molecular Biology	10
Yale University	9
Bell Labs	8
Cornell University	8
Harvard Medical School	8
Case Western Reserve University	7
Heidelberg University	7
University of California, Santa Barbara	7
Pasteur Institute	6
Lebedev Physical Institute	6
Sorbonne University	6
University College London	6
University of London	6
University of Pennsylvania	6
Collège de France	5
Karolinska Institute	5
Kyoto University	5
National Institutes of Health	5
Scripps Research	5
University of California, Los Angeles	5
University of Göttingen	5
University of Texas Southwestern Medical Center	5
Uppsala University	5
Washington University in St. Louis	5
CERN	4
ETH Zurich	4
IBM Zurich Research Laboratory	4
Imperial College London	4
Johns Hopkins School of Medicine	4
Northwestern University	4
University of Copenhagen	4
University of Illinois Urbana-Champaign	4
University of Strasbourg	4
University of Toronto	4
University of Washington	4
University of Wisconsin–Madison	4
University of Zurich	4
Academy of Sciences of the Soviet Union	3
Brown University	3
Carnegie Mellon University	3
École Polytechnique	3
ENS Paris	3
Fred Hutchinson Cancer Research Center	3
Fritz Haber Institute of the Max Planck Society	3
Imperial Cancer Research Fund	3
JILA	3
Kiel University	3
Leiden University	3
LIGO Scientific Collaboration	3
Massachusetts General Hospital	3
Max Planck Institute for Biophysical Chemistry	3
Max Planck Institute for Medical Research	3
Max Planck Institute of Biochemistry	3
Moscow State University	3
Nagoya University	3
National Institute of Standards and Technology	3
Stanford University School of Medicine	3
Stockholm University	3
Technical University of Munich	3
Technion – Israel Institute of Technology	3
UCSF School of Medicine	3
Université libre de Bruxelles	3
University of California, Irvine	3
University of California, San Diego	3
University of Edinburgh	3
University of Oslo	3
University of Vienna	3
Victoria University of Manchester	3
Wellcome Research Laboratories	3
LMU Munich	2
Aarhus University	2
Arizona State University	2
Australian National University	2
Basel Institute for Immunology	2
Boston Children's Hospital	2
Brigham and Women's Hospital	2
ESPCI Paris	2
Francis Crick Institute	2
General Electric	2
George Mason University	2
German Cancer Research Center	2
IG Farben	2
Indiana University Bloomington	2
Institut du Radium	2
Institute for Advanced Study	2
Johns Hopkins University	2
Leipzig University	2
London School of Economics	2
Max Planck Institute for Chemistry	2
Max Planck Institute for Coal Research	2
Max Planck Institute for Physics	2
Max Planck Institute of Quantum Optics	2
Mayo Clinic	2
Meijo University	2
National Institute for Medical Research	2
New York University	2
Norwegian University of Science and Technology	2
Purdue University	2
Rice University	2
Royal Institution	2
Sapienza University of Rome	2
Université catholique de Louvain	2
University of Amsterdam	2
University of Bonn	2
University of California, Riverside	2
University of California, San Francisco	2
University of Colorado Boulder	2
University of Freiburg	2
University of Geneva	2
University of Graz	2
University of Groningen	2
University of Liverpool	2
University of Manchester	2
University of North Carolina at Chapel Hill	2
University of Southern California	2
University of Sussex	2
University of Szeged	2
University of Texas at Austin	2
University of Tokyo	2
University of Tsukuba	2
Utrecht University	2

== List of laureates ==
Nobel laureates by affiliation
Laureate	Discipline	Year of award	Affiliation
Alexei Abrikosov	Physics	2003	Argonne National Laboratory
Daron Acemoglu	Economics	2024	Massachusetts Institute of Technology
Edgar Adrian	Physiology or Medicine	1932	University of Cambridge
Pierre Agostini	Physics	2023	Ohio State University
Peter Agre	Chemistry	2003	Johns Hopkins School of Medicine
Isamu Akasaki	Physics	2014	Meijo University
Isamu Akasaki	Physics	2014	Nagoya University
George Akerlof	Economics	2001	University of California, Berkeley
Kurt Alder	Chemistry	1950	University of Cologne
Zhores Alferov	Physics	2000	Ioffe Institute
Hannes Alfvén	Physics	1970	KTH Royal Institute of Technology
Maurice Allais	Economics	1988	Mines ParisTech
James P. Allison	Physiology or Medicine	2018	MD Anderson Cancer Center
James P. Allison	Physiology or Medicine	2018	Parker Institute for Cancer Immunotherapy
Harvey J. Alter	Physiology or Medicine	2020	National Institutes of Health
Sidney Altman	Chemistry	1989	Yale University
Luis Walter Alvarez	Physics	1968	University of California, Berkeley
Hiroshi Amano	Physics	2014	Nagoya University
Victor Ambros	Physiology or Medicine	2024	UMass Chan Medical School
Carl David Anderson	Physics	1936	California Institute of Technology
Philip W. Anderson	Physics	1977	Bell Labs
Christian B. Anfinsen	Chemistry	1972	National Institutes of Health
Joshua Angrist	Economics	2021	Massachusetts Institute of Technology
Edward Victor Appleton	Physics	1947	Department of Scientific and Industrial Research
Werner Arber	Physiology or Medicine	1978	Biozentrum University of Basel
Frances Arnold	Chemistry	2018	California Institute of Technology
Svante Arrhenius	Chemistry	1903	Stockholm University
Kenneth Arrow	Economics	1972	Harvard University
Arthur Ashkin	Physics	2018	Bell Labs
Alain Aspect	Physics	2022	École Polytechnique
Alain Aspect	Physics	2022	Institut d'optique Graduate School
Alain Aspect	Physics	2022	Paris-Saclay University
Francis William Aston	Chemistry	1922	University of Cambridge
Robert Aumann	Economics	2005	Hebrew University of Jerusalem
Philippe Aghion	Economics	2025	Collège de France
Philippe Aghion	Economics	2025	INSEAD
Joel Mokyr	Economics	2025	Northwestern University
Joel Mokyr	Economics	2025	Tel Aviv University
Peter Howitt	Economics	2025	Brown University
Philippe Aghion	Economics	2025	London School of Economics
Richard Axel	Physiology or Medicine	2004	Columbia University
Julius Axelrod	Physiology or Medicine	1970	National Institutes of Health
Adolf von Baeyer	Chemistry	1905	LMU Munich
David Baltimore	Physiology or Medicine	1975	Massachusetts Institute of Technology
Abhijit Banerjee	Economics	2019	Massachusetts Institute of Technology
Frederick Banting	Physiology or Medicine	1923	University of Toronto
Róbert Bárány	Physiology or Medicine	1914	University of Vienna
John Bardeen	Physics	1956	University of Illinois Urbana-Champaign
John Bardeen	Physics	1972	University of Illinois Urbana-Champaign
Barry Barish	Physics	2017	California Institute of Technology
Barry Barish	Physics	2017	LIGO Scientific Collaboration
Charles Glover Barkla	Physics	1917	University of Edinburgh
Françoise Barré-Sinoussi	Physiology or Medicine	2008	Pasteur Institute
Derek Barton	Chemistry	1969	Imperial College London
Nikolay Basov	Physics	1964	Lebedev Physical Institute
Moungi Bawendi	Chemistry	2023	Massachusetts Institute of Technology
George Beadle	Physiology or Medicine	1958	California Institute of Technology
Gary Becker	Economics	1992	University of Chicago
Henri Becquerel	Physics	1903	École Polytechnique
Georg Bednorz	Physics	1987	IBM Zurich Research Laboratory
Emil von Behring	Physiology or Medicine	1901	University of Marburg
Georg von Békésy	Physiology or Medicine	1961	Harvard University
Baruj Benacerraf	Physiology or Medicine	1980	Harvard Medical School
Paul Berg	Chemistry	1980	Stanford University
Friedrich Bergius	Chemistry	1931	Heidelberg University
Friedrich Bergius	Chemistry	1931	IG Farben
Sune Bergström	Physiology or Medicine	1982	Karolinska Institute
Carolyn Bertozzi	Chemistry	2022	Howard Hughes Medical Institute
Carolyn Bertozzi	Chemistry	2022	Stanford University
Hans Bethe	Physics	1967	Cornell University
Eric Betzig	Chemistry	2014	Janelia Research Campus
Bruce Beutler	Physiology or Medicine	2011	Scripps Research
Bruce Beutler	Physiology or Medicine	2011	University of Texas Southwestern Medical Center
Gerd Binnig	Physics	1986	IBM Zurich Research Laboratory
J. Michael Bishop	Physiology or Medicine	1989	UCSF School of Medicine
James Black	Physiology or Medicine	1988	King's College Hospital Medical School
Elizabeth Blackburn	Physiology or Medicine	2009	University of California, San Francisco
Patrick Blackett	Physics	1948	Victoria University of Manchester
Günter Blobel	Physiology or Medicine	1999	Howard Hughes Medical Institute
Günter Blobel	Physiology or Medicine	1999	Rockefeller University
Felix Bloch	Physics	1952	Stanford University
Konrad Emil Bloch	Physiology or Medicine	1964	Harvard University
Nicolaas Bloembergen	Physics	1981	Harvard University
Baruch Samuel Blumberg	Physiology or Medicine	1976	Lankenau Institute for Medical Research
Aage Bohr	Physics	1975	Niels Bohr Institute
Niels Bohr	Physics	1922	University of Copenhagen
Jules Bordet	Physiology or Medicine	1919	Université libre de Bruxelles
Max Born	Physics	1954	University of Edinburgh
Carl Bosch	Chemistry	1931	Heidelberg University
Carl Bosch	Chemistry	1931	IG Farben
Walther Bothe	Physics	1954	Heidelberg University
Walther Bothe	Physics	1954	Max Planck Institute for Medical Research
Daniel Bovet	Physiology or Medicine	1957	Istituto Superiore di Sanità
Paul D. Boyer	Chemistry	1997	University of California, Los Angeles
Willard Boyle	Physics	2009	Bell Labs
Lawrence Bragg	Physics	1915	Victoria University of Manchester
William Henry Bragg	Physics	1915	University College London
Walter Houser Brattain	Physics	1956	Bell Labs
Karl Ferdinand Braun	Physics	1909	University of Strasbourg
Sydney Brenner	Physiology or Medicine	2002	Molecular Sciences Institute
Percy Williams Bridgman	Physics	1946	Harvard University
Bertram Brockhouse	Physics	1994	McMaster University
Louis de Broglie	Physics	1929	Institut Henri Poincaré
Herbert C. Brown	Chemistry	1979	Purdue University
Michael Stuart Brown	Physiology or Medicine	1985	University of Texas Southwestern Medical Center
Louis E. Brus	Chemistry	2023	Columbia University
James M. Buchanan	Economics	1986	George Mason University
Eduard Buchner	Chemistry	1907	Agricultural University of Berlin
Linda B. Buck	Physiology or Medicine	2004	Fred Hutchinson Cancer Research Center
Ralph Bunche	Peace	1950	Harvard University
Macfarlane Burnet	Physiology or Medicine	1960	WEHI
Adolf Butenandt	Chemistry	1939	Humboldt University of Berlin
Adolf Butenandt	Chemistry	1939	Max Planck Institute of Biochemistry
Nicholas Murray Butler	Peace	1931	Columbia University
Melvin Calvin	Chemistry	1961	University of California, Berkeley
William C. Campbell	Physiology or Medicine	2015	Drew University
Mario Capecchi	Physiology or Medicine	2007	Howard Hughes Medical Institute
Mario Capecchi	Physiology or Medicine	2007	University of Utah
David Card	Economics	2021	University of California, Berkeley
Arvid Carlsson	Physiology or Medicine	2000	University of Gothenburg
Alexis Carrel	Physiology or Medicine	1912	Rockefeller University
Anne Carson	Literature	2026	
Thomas Cech	Chemistry	1989	University of Colorado Boulder
James Chadwick	Physics	1935	University of Liverpool
Ernst Chain	Physiology or Medicine	1945	University of Oxford
Martin Chalfie	Chemistry	2008	Columbia University
Owen Chamberlain	Physics	1959	University of California, Berkeley
Subrahmanyan Chandrasekhar	Physics	1983	University of Chicago
Georges Charpak	Physics	1992	CERN
Georges Charpak	Physics	1992	ESPCI Paris
Emmanuelle Charpentier	Chemistry	2020	Max Planck Unit for the Science of Pathogens
Yves Chauvin	Chemistry	2005	French Institute of Petroleum
Pavel Cherenkov	Physics	1958	Lebedev Physical Institute
Steven Chu	Physics	1997	Stanford University
Aaron Ciechanover	Chemistry	2004	Technion – Israel Institute of Technology
Albert Claude	Physiology or Medicine	1974	Université catholique de Louvain
John Clauser	Physics	2022	J. F. Clauser and Associates
John Clarke	Physics	2025	University of California, Berkeley
Ronald Coase	Economics	1991	University of Chicago
John Cockcroft	Physics	1951	Atomic Energy Research Establishment
Stanley Cohen	Physiology or Medicine	1986	Vanderbilt University School of Medicine
Claude Cohen-Tannoudji	Physics	1997	Collège de France
Claude Cohen-Tannoudji	Physics	1997	ENS Paris
Arthur Compton	Physics	1927	University of Chicago
Leon Cooper	Physics	1972	Brown University
Elias James Corey	Chemistry	1990	Harvard University
Carl Ferdinand Cori	Physiology or Medicine	1947	Washington University in St. Louis
Gerty Cori	Physiology or Medicine	1947	Washington University in St. Louis
Allan MacLeod Cormack	Physiology or Medicine	1979	Tufts University
Eric Allin Cornell	Physics	2001	JILA
John Cornforth	Chemistry	1975	University of Sussex
André Frédéric Cournand	Physiology or Medicine	1956	Bellevue Hospital
Donald J. Cram	Chemistry	1987	University of California, Los Angeles
Francis Crick	Physiology or Medicine	1962	MRC Laboratory of Molecular Biology
James Cronin	Physics	1980	University of Chicago
Paul J. Crutzen	Chemistry	1995	Max Planck Institute for Chemistry
Marie Curie	Chemistry	1911	Sorbonne University
Marie Curie	Physics	1903	
Pierre Curie	Physics	1903	ESPCI Paris
Robert Curl	Chemistry	1996	Rice University
Henry Hallett Dale	Physiology or Medicine	1936	National Institute for Medical Research
Gustaf Dalén	Physics	1912	AGA AB
Henrik Dam	Physiology or Medicine	1943	Technical University of Denmark
Jean Dausset	Physiology or Medicine	1980	University of Paris
Raymond Davis Jr.	Physics	2002	University of Pennsylvania
Clinton Davisson	Physics	1937	Bell Labs
Angus Deaton	Economics	2015	Princeton University
Gérard Debreu	Economics	1983	University of California, Berkeley
Peter Debye	Chemistry	1936	Humboldt University of Berlin
Peter Debye	Chemistry	1936	Max Planck Institute for Physics
Hans Georg Dehmelt	Physics	1989	University of Washington
Johann Deisenhofer	Chemistry	1988	Howard Hughes Medical Institute
Johann Deisenhofer	Chemistry	1988	University of Texas Southwestern Medical Center
Karl Deisseroth	Physiology or Medicine	2026	Howard Hughes Medical Institute
Karl Deisseroth	Physiology or Medicine	2026	Stanford University
Max Delbrück	Physiology or Medicine	1969	California Institute of Technology
Michel H. Devoret	Physics	2025	University of California, Santa Barbara
Michel H. Devoret	Physics	2025	Yale University
Douglas W. Diamond	Economics	2022	University of Chicago
Peter Diamond	Economics	2010	Massachusetts Institute of Technology
Otto Diels	Chemistry	1950	Kiel University
Paul Dirac	Physics	1933	University of Cambridge
Peter C. Doherty	Physiology or Medicine	1996	St. Jude Children's Research Hospital
Edward Adelbert Doisy	Physiology or Medicine	1943	Saint Louis University
Gerhard Domagk	Physiology or Medicine	1939	University of Münster
Jennifer Doudna	Chemistry	2020	University of California, Berkeley
Jacques Dubochet	Chemistry	2017	University of Lausanne
Esther Duflo	Economics	2019	Massachusetts Institute of Technology
Renato Dulbecco	Physiology or Medicine	1975	Imperial Cancer Research Fund
Christian de Duve	Physiology or Medicine	1974	Rockefeller University
Christian de Duve	Physiology or Medicine	1974	Université catholique de Louvain
Philip H. Dybvig	Economics	2022	Washington University in St. Louis
John Eccles	Physiology or Medicine	1963	Australian National University
Gerald Edelman	Physiology or Medicine	1972	Rockefeller University
Robert Edwards	Physiology or Medicine	2010	University of Cambridge
Paul Ehrlich	Physiology or Medicine	1908	Paul Ehrlich Institute
Paul Ehrlich	Physiology or Medicine	1908	University of Göttingen
Manfred Eigen	Chemistry	1967	Max Planck Institute for Biophysical Chemistry
Christiaan Eijkman	Physiology or Medicine	1929	Utrecht University
Albert Einstein	Physics	1921	Max Planck Institute for Physics
Willem Einthoven	Physiology or Medicine	1924	Leiden University
Gertrude B. Elion	Physiology or Medicine	1988	Wellcome Research Laboratories
John Franklin Enders	Physiology or Medicine	1954	Boston Children's Hospital
John Franklin Enders	Physiology or Medicine	1954	Harvard Medical School
Robert F. Engle	Economics	2003	New York University
François Englert	Physics	2013	Université libre de Bruxelles
Joseph Erlanger	Physiology or Medicine	1944	Washington University in St. Louis
Richard R. Ernst	Chemistry	1991	ETH Zurich
Gerhard Ertl	Chemistry	2007	Fritz Haber Institute of the Max Planck Society
Leo Esaki	Physics	1973	Thomas J. Watson Research Center
Ulf von Euler	Physiology or Medicine	1970	Karolinska Institute
Hans von Euler-Chelpin	Chemistry	1929	Stockholm University
Martin Evans	Physiology or Medicine	2007	Cardiff University
Eugene Fama	Economics	2013	University of Chicago
John B. Fenn	Chemistry	2002	Virginia Commonwealth University
Ben Feringa	Chemistry	2016	University of Groningen
Enrico Fermi	Physics	1938	Sapienza University of Rome
Albert Fert	Physics	2007	Paris-Sud University
Albert Fert	Physics	2007	Unité Mixte de Physique CNRS/THALES
Richard Feynman	Physics	1965	California Institute of Technology
Johannes Fibiger	Physiology or Medicine	1926	University of Copenhagen
Niels Ryberg Finsen	Physiology or Medicine	1903	Finsen Medical Light Institute
Andrew Fire	Physiology or Medicine	2006	Stanford University School of Medicine
Edmond H. Fischer	Physiology or Medicine	1992	University of Washington
Emil Fischer	Chemistry	1902	Humboldt University of Berlin
Ernst Otto Fischer	Chemistry	1973	Technical University of Munich
Hans Fischer	Chemistry	1930	Technical University of Munich
Val Logsdon Fitch	Physics	1980	Princeton University
Alexander Fleming	Physiology or Medicine	1945	University of London
Howard Florey	Physiology or Medicine	1945	University of Oxford
Paul Flory	Chemistry	1974	Stanford University
Robert Fogel	Economics	1993	University of Chicago
Werner Forssmann	Physiology or Medicine	1956	University of Mainz
William Alfred Fowler	Physics	1983	California Institute of Technology
James Franck	Physics	1925	University of Göttingen
Ilya Frank	Physics	1958	Lebedev Physical Institute
Ilya Frank	Physics	1958	Moscow State University
Joachim Frank	Chemistry	2017	Columbia University
Jerome Isaac Friedman	Physics	1990	Massachusetts Institute of Technology
Milton Friedman	Economics	1976	University of Chicago
Karl von Frisch	Physiology or Medicine	1973	LMU Munich
Ragnar Frisch	Economics	1969	University of Oslo
Kenichi Fukui	Chemistry	1981	Kyoto University
Robert F. Furchgott	Physiology or Medicine	1998	SUNY Downstate Medical Center
Dennis Gabor	Physics	1971	Imperial College London
Daniel Carleton Gajdusek	Physiology or Medicine	1976	National Institutes of Health
Herbert Spencer Gasser	Physiology or Medicine	1944	Rockefeller University
Riccardo Giacconi	Physics	2002	Associated Universities, Inc.
Ivar Giaever	Physics	1973	General Electric
Andre Geim	Physics	2010	University of Manchester
Murray Gell-Mann	Physics	1969	California Institute of Technology
Pierre-Gilles de Gennes	Physics	1991	Collège de France
Reinhard Genzel	Physics	2020	Max Planck Institute for Extraterrestrial Physics
Reinhard Genzel	Physics	2020	University of California, Berkeley
Andrea M. Ghez	Physics	2020	University of California, Los Angeles
William Giauque	Chemistry	1949	University of California, Berkeley
Walter Gilbert	Chemistry	1980	Harvard University
Alfred G. Gilman	Physiology or Medicine	1994	University of Texas Southwestern Medical Center
Vitaly Ginzburg	Physics	2003	Lebedev Physical Institute
Donald A. Glaser	Physics	1960	University of California, Berkeley
Sheldon Glashow	Physics	1979	Harvard University
Roy J. Glauber	Physics	2005	Harvard University
Claudia Goldin	Economics	2023	Harvard University
Joseph L. Goldstein	Physiology or Medicine	1985	University of Texas Southwestern Medical Center
Camillo Golgi	Physiology or Medicine	1906	University of Pavia
John B. Goodenough	Chemistry	2019	University of Texas at Austin
Clive Granger	Economics	2003	University of California, San Diego
Ragnar Granit	Physiology or Medicine	1967	Karolinska Institute
Paul Greengard	Physiology or Medicine	2000	Rockefeller University
Carol W. Greider	Physiology or Medicine	2009	Johns Hopkins School of Medicine
Victor Grignard	Chemistry	1912	Nancy-Université
David Gross	Physics	2004	Kavli Institute for Theoretical Physics
Robert H. Grubbs	Chemistry	2005	California Institute of Technology
Peter Grünberg	Physics	2007	Forschungszentrum Jülich
Charles Édouard Guillaume	Physics	1920	International Bureau of Weights and Measures
Roger Guillemin	Physiology or Medicine	1977	Salk Institute for Biological Studies
Allvar Gullstrand	Physiology or Medicine	1911	Uppsala University
John Gurdon	Physiology or Medicine	2012	Gurdon Institute
Trygve Haavelmo	Economics	1989	University of Oslo
Fritz Haber	Chemistry	1918	Fritz Haber Institute of the Max Planck Society
Otto Hahn	Chemistry	1944	Max Planck Institute for Chemistry
Duncan Haldane	Physics	2016	Princeton University
Jeffrey C. Hall	Physiology or Medicine	2017	University of Maine
John L. Hall	Physics	2005	JILA
John L. Hall	Physics	2005	National Institute of Standards and Technology
Francis Halzen	Physics	2026	University of Wisconsin–Madison
Theodor W. Hänsch	Physics	2005	LMU Munich
Theodor W. Hänsch	Physics	2005	Max Planck Institute of Quantum Optics
Lars Peter Hansen	Economics	2013	University of Chicago
Arthur Harden	Chemistry	1929	University of London
Serge Haroche	Physics	2012	Collège de France
Serge Haroche	Physics	2012	ENS Paris
John Harsanyi	Economics	1994	University of California, Berkeley
Oliver Hart	Economics	2016	Harvard University
Haldan Keffer Hartline	Physiology or Medicine	1967	Rockefeller University
Leland H. Hartwell	Physiology or Medicine	2001	Fred Hutchinson Cancer Research Center
Odd Hassel	Chemistry	1969	University of Oslo
Klaus Hasselmann	Physics	2021	Max Planck Institute for Meteorology
Herbert A. Hauptman	Chemistry	1985	Medical Foundation of Buffalo
Harald zur Hausen	Physiology or Medicine	2008	German Cancer Research Center
Norman Haworth	Chemistry	1937	University of Birmingham
Richard F. Heck	Chemistry	2010	University of Delaware
James Heckman	Economics	2000	University of Chicago
Alan J. Heeger	Chemistry	2000	University of California, Santa Barbara
Peter Hegemann	Physiology or Medicine	2026	Humboldt University of Berlin
Werner Heisenberg	Physics	1932	Leipzig University
Stefan Hell	Chemistry	2014	German Cancer Research Center
Stefan Hell	Chemistry	2014	Max Planck Institute for Biophysical Chemistry
Philip Showalter Hench	Physiology or Medicine	1950	Mayo Clinic
Richard Henderson	Chemistry	2017	MRC Laboratory of Molecular Biology
Dudley R. Herschbach	Chemistry	1986	Harvard University
Alfred Hershey	Physiology or Medicine	1969	Carnegie Institution for Science
Avram Hershko	Chemistry	2004	Technion – Israel Institute of Technology
Gustav Ludwig Hertz	Physics	1925	Halle University
Gerhard Herzberg	Chemistry	1971	National Research Council Canada
Victor Francis Hess	Physics	1936	University of Innsbruck
Walter Rudolf Hess	Physiology or Medicine	1949	University of Zurich
George de Hevesy	Chemistry	1943	Stockholm University
Antony Hewish	Physics	1974	University of Cambridge
Corneille Heymans	Physiology or Medicine	1938	Ghent University
Jaroslav Heyrovský	Chemistry	1959	Czechoslovak Academy of Sciences
John Hicks	Economics	1972	University of Oxford
Peter Higgs	Physics	2013	University of Edinburgh
Archibald Hill	Physiology or Medicine	1922	University of London
Cyril Norman Hinshelwood	Chemistry	1956	University of Oxford
Geoffrey Hinton	Physics	2024	University of Toronto
George H. Hitchings	Physiology or Medicine	1988	Wellcome Research Laboratories
Alan Hodgkin	Physiology or Medicine	1963	University of Cambridge
Dorothy Hodgkin	Chemistry	1964	University of Oxford
Jacobus Henricus van 't Hoff	Chemistry	1901	Humboldt University of Berlin
Jules A. Hoffmann	Physiology or Medicine	2011	University of Strasbourg
Roald Hoffmann	Chemistry	1981	Cornell University
Robert Hofstadter	Physics	1961	Stanford University
Robert W. Holley	Physiology or Medicine	1968	Cornell University
Bengt Holmström	Economics	2016	Massachusetts Institute of Technology
Tasuku Honjo	Physiology or Medicine	2018	Kyoto University
Gerard 't Hooft	Physics	1999	Utrecht University
John Hopfield	Physics	2024	Princeton University
Frederick Gowland Hopkins	Physiology or Medicine	1929	University of Cambridge
H. Robert Horvitz	Physiology or Medicine	2002	Massachusetts Institute of Technology
Michael Houghton	Physiology or Medicine	2020	University of Alberta
Godfrey Hounsfield	Physiology or Medicine	1979	Central Research Laboratories
Bernardo Houssay	Physiology or Medicine	1947	Instituto de Biología y Medicina Experimental
David H. Hubel	Physiology or Medicine	1981	Harvard Medical School
Robert Huber	Chemistry	1988	Max Planck Institute of Biochemistry
Charles Brenton Huggins	Physiology or Medicine	1966	University of Chicago
Russell Alan Hulse	Physics	1993	Princeton University
Tim Hunt	Physiology or Medicine	2001	Imperial Cancer Research Fund
Leonid Hurwicz	Economics	2007	University of Minnesota
Andrew Huxley	Physiology or Medicine	1963	University College London
Louis Ignarro	Physiology or Medicine	1998	University of California, Los Angeles, David Geffen School of Medicine
Guido Imbens	Economics	2021	Stanford University
François Jacob	Physiology or Medicine	1965	Pasteur Institute
J. Hans D. Jensen	Physics	1963	Heidelberg University
Niels Kaj Jerne	Physiology or Medicine	1984	Basel Institute for Immunology
Simon Johnson	Economics	2024	Massachusetts Institute of Technology
Frédéric Joliot-Curie	Chemistry	1935	Institut du Radium
Irène Joliot-Curie	Chemistry	1935	Institut du Radium
Brian Josephson	Physics	1973	University of Cambridge
David Julius	Physiology or Medicine	2021	University of California, San Francisco
William Kaelin Jr.	Physiology or Medicine	2019	Brigham and Women's Hospital
William Kaelin Jr.	Physiology or Medicine	2019	Dana–Farber Cancer Institute
William Kaelin Jr.	Physiology or Medicine	2019	Harvard Medical School
William Kaelin Jr.	Physiology or Medicine	2019	Howard Hughes Medical Institute
Henri B. Kagan	Chemistry	2026	Paris-Sud University
Daniel Kahneman	Economics	2002	Princeton University
Takaaki Kajita	Physics	2015	University of Tokyo
Eric Kandel	Physiology or Medicine	2000	Columbia University
Leonid Kantorovich	Economics	1975	Academy of Sciences of the Soviet Union
Charles K. Kao	Physics	2009	Chinese University of Hong Kong
Charles K. Kao	Physics	2009	Standard Telecommunication Laboratories
Pyotr Kapitsa	Physics	1978	Academy of Sciences of the Soviet Union
Katalin Karikó	Physiology or Medicine	2023	University of Pennsylvania
Katalin Karikó	Physiology or Medicine	2023	University of Szeged
Jerome Karle	Chemistry	1985	United States Naval Research Laboratory
Martin Karplus	Chemistry	2013	Harvard University
Martin Karplus	Chemistry	2013	University of Strasbourg
Paul Karrer	Chemistry	1937	University of Zurich
Alfred Kastler	Physics	1966	ENS Paris
Bernard Katz	Physiology or Medicine	1970	University College London
Edward Calvin Kendall	Physiology or Medicine	1950	Mayo Clinic
Henry Way Kendall	Physics	1990	Massachusetts Institute of Technology
John Kendrew	Chemistry	1962	MRC Laboratory of Molecular Biology
Wolfgang Ketterle	Physics	2001	Massachusetts Institute of Technology
Har Gobind Khorana	Physiology or Medicine	1968	University of Wisconsin–Madison
Jack Kilby	Physics	2000	Texas Instruments
Susumu Kitagawa	Chemistry	2025	Kyoto University
Lawrence Klein	Economics	1980	University of Pennsylvania
Klaus von Klitzing	Physics	1985	Max Planck Institute for Solid State Research
Aaron Klug	Chemistry	1982	MRC Laboratory of Molecular Biology
Makoto Kobayashi	Physics	2008	KEK
Brian Kobilka	Chemistry	2012	Stanford University School of Medicine
Robert Koch	Physiology or Medicine	1905	Institute for Infectious Diseases
Emil Theodor Kocher	Physiology or Medicine	1909	University of Bern
Georges J. F. Köhler	Physiology or Medicine	1984	Basel Institute for Immunology
Walter Kohn	Chemistry	1998	University of California, Santa Barbara
Tjalling Koopmans	Economics	1975	Yale University
Arthur Kornberg	Physiology or Medicine	1959	Stanford University
Roger D. Kornberg	Chemistry	2006	Stanford University
Masatoshi Koshiba	Physics	2002	University of Tokyo
Albrecht Kossel	Physiology or Medicine	1910	Heidelberg University
J. Michael Kosterlitz	Physics	2016	Brown University
Ferenc Krausz	Physics	2023	Max Planck Institute of Quantum Optics
Ferenc Krausz	Physics	2023	LMU Munich
Edwin G. Krebs	Physiology or Medicine	1992	University of Washington
Hans Krebs	Physiology or Medicine	1953	University of Sheffield
Michael Kremer	Economics	2019	Harvard University
Herbert Kroemer	Physics	2000	University of California, Santa Barbara
August Krogh	Physiology or Medicine	1920	University of Copenhagen
Harry Kroto	Chemistry	1996	University of Sussex
Paul Krugman	Economics	2008	Princeton University
Richard Kuhn	Chemistry	1938	Heidelberg University
Richard Kuhn	Chemistry	1938	Max Planck Institute for Medical Research
Polykarp Kusch	Physics	1955	Columbia University
Simon Kuznets	Economics	1971	Harvard University
Finn E. Kydland	Economics	2004	Carnegie Mellon University
Finn E. Kydland	Economics	2004	University of California, Santa Barbara
Willis Lamb	Physics	1955	Stanford University
Lev Landau	Physics	1962	Academy of Sciences of the Soviet Union
Karl Landsteiner	Physiology or Medicine	1930	Rockefeller University
Irving Langmuir	Chemistry	1932	General Electric
Max von Laue	Physics	1914	Goethe University Frankfurt
Robert B. Laughlin	Physics	1998	Stanford University
Paul Lauterbur	Physiology or Medicine	2003	University of Illinois Urbana-Champaign
Charles Louis Alphonse Laveran	Physiology or Medicine	1907	Pasteur Institute
Ernest Lawrence	Physics	1939	University of California, Berkeley
Joshua Lederberg	Physiology or Medicine	1958	University of Wisconsin–Madison
Leon M. Lederman	Physics	1988	Fermilab
David Lee	Physics	1996	Cornell University
Tsung-Dao Lee	Physics	1957	Columbia University
Yuan T. Lee	Chemistry	1986	University of California, Berkeley
Robert Lefkowitz	Chemistry	2012	Duke University Medical Center
Robert Lefkowitz	Chemistry	2012	Howard Hughes Medical Institute
Anthony James Leggett	Physics	2003	University of Illinois Urbana-Champaign
Jean-Marie Lehn	Chemistry	1987	Collège de France
Jean-Marie Lehn	Chemistry	1987	Louis Pasteur University
Luis Federico Leloir	Chemistry	1970	University of Buenos Aires
Philipp Lenard	Physics	1905	Kiel University
Wassily Leontief	Economics	1973	Harvard University
Rita Levi-Montalcini	Physiology or Medicine	1986	Institute of Cell Biology of the C.N.R.
Michael Levitt	Chemistry	2013	Stanford University School of Medicine
W. Arthur Lewis	Economics	1979	Princeton University
Edward B. Lewis	Physiology or Medicine	1995	California Institute of Technology
Willard Libby	Chemistry	1960	University of California, Los Angeles
Tomas Lindahl	Chemistry	2015	Clare Hall laboratories
Tomas Lindahl	Chemistry	2015	Francis Crick Institute
Fritz Albert Lipmann	Physiology or Medicine	1953	Harvard Medical School
Fritz Albert Lipmann	Physiology or Medicine	1953	Massachusetts General Hospital
Gabriel Lippmann	Physics	1908	Sorbonne University
William Lipscomb	Chemistry	1976	Harvard University
Benjamin List	Chemistry	2021	Max Planck Institute for Coal Research
Anne L'Huillier	Physics	2023	Lund University
Otto Loewi	Physiology or Medicine	1936	University of Graz
Hendrik Lorentz	Physics	1902	Leiden University
Konrad Lorenz	Physiology or Medicine	1973	Konrad Lorenz Institute of Ethology
Robert Lucas Jr.	Economics	1995	University of Chicago
Salvador Luria	Physiology or Medicine	1969	Massachusetts Institute of Technology
André Michel Lwoff	Physiology or Medicine	1965	Pasteur Institute
Feodor Lynen	Physiology or Medicine	1964	Max Planck Institute of Biochemistry
Alan MacDiarmid	Chemistry	2000	University of Pennsylvania
Roderick MacKinnon	Chemistry	2003	Howard Hughes Medical Institute
Roderick MacKinnon	Chemistry	2003	Rockefeller University
John Macleod	Physiology or Medicine	1923	University of Toronto
David MacMillan	Chemistry	2021	Princeton University
Syukuro Manabe	Physics	2021	Princeton University
Peter Mansfield	Physiology or Medicine	2003	University of Nottingham
Guglielmo Marconi	Physics	1909	Marconi Company
Rudolph A. Marcus	Chemistry	1992	California Institute of Technology
Harry Markowitz	Economics	1990	City University of New York
Barry Marshall	Physiology or Medicine	2005	NHMRC Helicobacter pylori Research Laboratory
Barry Marshall	Physiology or Medicine	2005	University of Western Australia
Archer Martin	Chemistry	1952	National Institute for Medical Research
John M. Martinis	Physics	2025	University of California, Santa Barbara
Toshihide Maskawa	Physics	2008	Kyoto Sangyo University
Toshihide Maskawa	Physics	2008	Yukawa Institute for Theoretical Physics
Eric Maskin	Economics	2007	Institute for Advanced Study
John C. Mather	Physics	2006	Goddard Space Flight Center
Maria Goeppert Mayer	Physics	1963	University of California, San Diego
Michel Mayor	Physics	2019	University of Geneva
Barbara McClintock	Physiology or Medicine	1983	Cold Spring Harbor Laboratory
Arthur B. McDonald	Physics	2015	Queen's University at Kingston
Daniel McFadden	Economics	2000	University of California, Berkeley
Edwin McMillan	Chemistry	1951	University of California, Berkeley
James Meade	Economics	1977	University of Cambridge
Peter Medawar	Physiology or Medicine	1960	University College London
Simon van der Meer	Physics	1984	CERN
Morten P. Meldal	Chemistry	2022	University of Copenhagen
Craig Mello	Physiology or Medicine	2006	University of Massachusetts
Robert Bruce Merrifield	Chemistry	1984	Rockefeller University
Robert C. Merton	Economics	1997	Harvard University
Élie Metchnikoff	Physiology or Medicine	1908	Pasteur Institute
Otto Fritz Meyerhof	Physiology or Medicine	1922	Kiel University
Hartmut Michel	Chemistry	1988	Max Planck Institute of Biophysics
Albert A. Michelson	Physics	1907	University of Chicago
Paul Milgrom	Economics	2020	Stanford University
Merton Miller	Economics	1990	University of Chicago
Robert Andrews Millikan	Physics	1923	California Institute of Technology
César Milstein	Physiology or Medicine	1984	MRC Laboratory of Molecular Biology
George Minot	Physiology or Medicine	1934	Harvard University
James Mirrlees	Economics	1996	University of Cambridge
Peter D. Mitchell	Chemistry	1978	Glynn Research Laboratories
Franco Modigliani	Economics	1985	Massachusetts Institute of Technology
Paul L. Modrich	Chemistry	2015	Duke University School of Medicine
Paul L. Modrich	Chemistry	2015	Howard Hughes Medical Institute
William E. Moerner	Chemistry	2014	Stanford University
Henri Moissan	Chemistry	1906	Sorbonne University
Mario Molina	Chemistry	1995	Massachusetts Institute of Technology
António Egas Moniz	Physiology or Medicine	1949	Neurological Institute, Lisbon
António Egas Moniz	Physiology or Medicine	1949	University of Lisbon
Jacques Monod	Physiology or Medicine	1965	Pasteur Institute
Luc Montagnier	Physiology or Medicine	2008	World Foundation for AIDS Research and Prevention
Stanford Moore	Chemistry	1972	Rockefeller University
Thomas Hunt Morgan	Physiology or Medicine	1933	California Institute of Technology
Dale T. Mortensen	Economics	2010	Aarhus University
Dale T. Mortensen	Economics	2010	Northwestern University
Edvard Moser	Physiology or Medicine	2014	Norwegian University of Science and Technology
May-Britt Moser	Physiology or Medicine	2014	Norwegian University of Science and Technology
Rudolf Mössbauer	Physics	1961	California Institute of Technology
Rudolf Mössbauer	Physics	1961	Technical University of Munich
Nevill Francis Mott	Physics	1977	University of Cambridge
Ben Roy Mottelson	Physics	1975	Nordic Institute for Theoretical Physics
Gérard Mourou	Physics	2018	École Polytechnique
Gérard Mourou	Physics	2018	University of Michigan
Hermann Joseph Muller	Physiology or Medicine	1946	Indiana University Bloomington
K. Alex Müller	Physics	1987	IBM Zurich Research Laboratory
Paul Hermann Müller	Physiology or Medicine	1948	J. R. Geigy AG
Robert S. Mulliken	Chemistry	1966	University of Chicago
Robert Mundell	Economics	1999	Columbia University
Ferid Murad	Physiology or Medicine	1998	University of Texas Medical School at Houston
William P. Murphy	Physiology or Medicine	1934	Harvard University
William P. Murphy	Physiology or Medicine	1934	Peter Brent Brigham Hospital
Joseph Murray	Physiology or Medicine	1990	Brigham and Women's Hospital
Roger Myerson	Economics	2007	University of Chicago
Georg Nagel	Physiology or Medicine	2026	University of Würzburg
Shuji Nakamura	Physics	2014	University of California, Santa Barbara
Yoichiro Nambu	Physics	2008	Enrico Fermi Institute
John Forbes Nash Jr.	Economics	1994	Princeton University
Daniel Nathans	Physiology or Medicine	1978	Johns Hopkins School of Medicine
Giulio Natta	Chemistry	1963	Polytechnic University of Milan
Louis Néel	Physics	1970	Grenoble Alpes University
Ei-ichi Negishi	Chemistry	2010	Purdue University
Erwin Neher	Physiology or Medicine	1991	Max Planck Institute for Biophysical Chemistry
Walther Nernst	Chemistry	1920	Humboldt University of Berlin
Charles Nicolle	Physiology or Medicine	1928	Pasteur Institute
Marshall Warren Nirenberg	Physiology or Medicine	1968	National Institutes of Health
William Nordhaus	Economics	2018	Yale University
Ronald George Wreyford Norrish	Chemistry	1967	University of Cambridge
Douglass North	Economics	1993	Washington University in St. Louis
John Howard Northrop	Chemistry	1946	Rockefeller University
Konstantin Novoselov	Physics	2010	University of Manchester
Ryōji Noyori	Chemistry	2001	Nagoya University
Paul Nurse	Physiology or Medicine	2001	Imperial Cancer Research Fund
Christiane Nüsslein-Volhard	Physiology or Medicine	1995	Max Planck Institute for Developmental Biology
Severo Ochoa	Physiology or Medicine	1959	New York University College of Medicine
Bertil Ohlin	Economics	1977	Stockholm School of Economics
Yoshinori Ohsumi	Physiology or Medicine	2016	Tokyo Institute of Technology
John O'Keefe	Physiology or Medicine	2014	University College London
George Andrew Olah	Chemistry	1994	University of Southern California
Satoshi Ōmura	Physiology or Medicine	2015	Kitasato University
Heike Kamerlingh Onnes	Physics	1913	Leiden University
Lars Onsager	Chemistry	1968	Yale University
Douglas Osheroff	Physics	1996	Stanford University
Elinor Ostrom	Economics	2009	Arizona State University
Elinor Ostrom	Economics	2009	Indiana University Bloomington
Wilhelm Ostwald	Chemistry	1909	Leipzig University
Svante Pääbo	Physiology or Medicine	2022	Max Planck Institute for Evolutionary Anthropology
Svante Pääbo	Physiology or Medicine	2022	Okinawa Institute of Science and Technology
George Emil Palade	Physiology or Medicine	1974	Yale School of Medicine
Giorgio Parisi	Physics	2021	Sapienza University of Rome
Ardem Patapoutian	Physiology or Medicine	2021	Howard Hughes Medical Institute
Ardem Patapoutian	Physiology or Medicine	2021	Scripps Research
Wolfgang Paul	Physics	1989	University of Bonn
Wolfgang Pauli	Physics	1945	Princeton University
Linus Pauling	Chemistry	1954	California Institute of Technology
Linus Pauling	Peace	1962	California Institute of Technology
Ivan Pavlov	Physiology or Medicine	1904	S. M. Kirov Military Medical Academy
Charles J. Pedersen	Chemistry	1987	DuPont
Jim Peebles	Physics	2019	Princeton University
Roger Penrose	Physics	2020	University of Oxford
Arno Allan Penzias	Physics	1978	Bell Labs
Martin Lewis Perl	Physics	1995	Stanford University
Saul Perlmutter	Physics	2011	Lawrence Berkeley National Laboratory
Saul Perlmutter	Physics	2011	University of California, Berkeley
Jean Baptiste Perrin	Physics	1926	Sorbonne University
Max Perutz	Chemistry	1962	MRC Laboratory of Molecular Biology
Edmund Phelps	Economics	2006	Columbia University
William Daniel Phillips	Physics	1997	National Institute of Standards and Technology
Christopher A. Pissarides	Economics	2010	London School of Economics
Max Planck	Physics	1918	Humboldt University of Berlin
John Polanyi	Chemistry	1986	University of Toronto
Hugh David Politzer	Physics	2004	California Institute of Technology
John Pople	Chemistry	1998	Northwestern University
George Porter	Physics	1967	Royal Institution
Rodney Robert Porter	Physiology or Medicine	1972	University of Oxford
C. F. Powell	Physics	1950	University of Bristol
Fritz Pregl	Chemistry	1923	University of Graz
Vladimir Prelog	Chemistry	1975	ETH Zurich
Edward C. Prescott	Economics	2004	Arizona State University
Edward C. Prescott	Economics	2004	Federal Reserve Bank of Minneapolis
Ilya Prigogine	Chemistry	1977	Université libre de Bruxelles
Ilya Prigogine	Chemistry	1977	University of Texas at Austin
Alexander Prokhorov	Physics	1964	Lebedev Physical Institute
Stanley B. Prusiner	Physiology or Medicine	1997	UCSF School of Medicine
Edward Mills Purcell	Physics	1952	Harvard University
Didier Queloz	Physics	2019	University of Cambridge
Didier Queloz	Physics	2019	University of Geneva
Isidor Isaac Rabi	Physics	1944	Columbia University
James Rainwater	Physics	1975	Columbia University
Venki Ramakrishnan	Chemistry	2009	MRC Laboratory of Molecular Biology
C. V. Raman	Physics	1930	University of Calcutta
Santiago Ramón y Cajal	Physiology or Medicine	1906	Complutense University of Madrid
William Ramsay	Chemistry	1904	University College London
Norman Foster Ramsey Jr.	Physics	1989	Harvard University
Peter J. Ratcliffe	Physiology or Medicine	2019	Francis Crick Institute
Peter J. Ratcliffe	Physiology or Medicine	2019	University of Oxford
Tadeusz Reichstein	Physiology or Medicine	1950	University of Basel
Frederick Reines	Physics	1995	University of California, Irvine
Louis Renault	Peace	1907	Sorbonne University
Charles M. Rice	Physiology or Medicine	2020	Rockefeller University
Dickinson W. Richards	Physiology or Medicine	1956	Columbia University
Theodore William Richards	Chemistry	1914	Harvard University
Owen Willans Richardson	Physics	1928	University of London
Robert Coleman Richardson	Physics	1996	Cornell University
Charles Richet	Physiology or Medicine	1913	Sorbonne University
Burton Richter	Physics	1976	SLAC National Accelerator Laboratory
Adam Riess	Physics	2011	Johns Hopkins University
Adam Riess	Physics	2011	Space Telescope Science Institute
Frederick Chapman Robbins	Physiology or Medicine	1954	Case Western Reserve University
Richard J. Roberts	Physiology or Medicine	1993	New England Biolabs
James A. Robinson	Economics	2024	University of Chicago
Robert Robinson	Chemistry	1947	University of Oxford
Richard Robson	Chemistry	2025	University of Melbourne
Martin Rodbell	Physiology or Medicine	1994	National Institute of Environmental Health Sciences
Heinrich Rohrer	Physics	1986	IBM Zurich Research Laboratory
Paul Romer	Economics	2018	New York University Stern School of Business
Wilhelm Röntgen	Physics	1901	LMU Munich
Michael Rosbash	Physiology or Medicine	2017	Brandeis University
Michael Rosbash	Physiology or Medicine	2017	Howard Hughes Medical Institute
Irwin Rose	Chemistry	2004	University of California, Irvine
Ronald Ross	Physiology or Medicine	1902	University of Liverpool
Alvin E. Roth	Economics	2012	Harvard Business School
Alvin E. Roth	Economics	2012	Harvard University
James Rothman	Physiology or Medicine	2013	Yale University
Francis Peyton Rous	Physiology or Medicine	1966	Rockefeller University
F. Sherwood Rowland	Chemistry	1995	University of California, Irvine
Carlo Rubbia	Physics	1984	CERN
Ernst Ruska	Physics	1986	Fritz Haber Institute of the Max Planck Society
Ernest Rutherford	Chemistry	1908	Victoria University of Manchester
Gary Ruvkun	Physiology or Medicine	2024	Massachusetts General Hospital
Gary Ruvkun	Physiology or Medicine	2024	Harvard Medical School
Leopold Ružička	Chemistry	1939	ETH Zurich
Martin Ryle	Physics	1974	University of Cambridge
Paul Sabatier	Chemistry	1912	University of Toulouse
Bert Sakmann	Physiology or Medicine	1991	Max Planck Institute for Medical Research
Abdus Salam	Physics	1979	Imperial College London
Abdus Salam	Physics	1979	International Centre for Theoretical Physics
Paul Samuelson	Economics	1970	Massachusetts Institute of Technology
Bengt I. Samuelsson	Physiology or Medicine	1982	Karolinska Institute
Aziz Sancar	Chemistry	2015	University of North Carolina at Chapel Hill
Frederick Sanger	Chemistry	1958	University of Cambridge
Frederick Sanger	Chemistry	1980	MRC Laboratory of Molecular Biology
Thomas J. Sargent	Economics	2011	New York University
Jean-Pierre Sauvage	Chemistry	2016	University of Strasbourg
Andrew Schally	Physiology or Medicine	1977	Veterans Administration Hospital, New Orleans
Arthur Leonard Schawlow	Physics	1981	Stanford University
Randy Schekman	Physiology or Medicine	2013	Howard Hughes Medical Institute
Randy Schekman	Physiology or Medicine	2013	University of California, Berkeley
Thomas Schelling	Economics	2005	University of Maryland, College Park
Brian Schmidt	Physics	2011	Australian National University
Myron Scholes	Economics	1997	Long-Term Capital Management
John Robert Schrieffer	Physics	1972	University of Pennsylvania
Richard R. Schrock	Chemistry	2005	Massachusetts Institute of Technology
Erwin Schrödinger	Physics	1933	Humboldt University of Berlin
Theodore Schultz	Economics	1979	University of Chicago
Melvin Schwartz	Physics	1988	Digital Pathways
Julian Schwinger	Physics	1965	Harvard University
Glenn T. Seaborg	Chemistry	1951	University of California, Berkeley
Emilio Segrè	Physics	1959	University of California, Berkeley
Reinhard Selten	Economics	1994	University of Bonn
Gregg L. Semenza	Physiology or Medicine	2019	Johns Hopkins University
Nikolay Semyonov	Chemistry	1956	Institute for Chemical Physics of the Academy of Sciences of the USSR
Nikolay Semyonov	Chemistry	1956	Moscow State University
Amartya Sen	Economics	1998	University of Cambridge
Lloyd Shapley	Economics	2012	University of California, Los Angeles
Phillip Allen Sharp	Physiology or Medicine	1993	Massachusetts Institute of Technology
William F. Sharpe	Economics	1990	Stanford University
Karl Barry Sharpless	Chemistry	2001	Scripps Research
Karl Barry Sharpless	Chemistry	2022	Scripps Research
Dan Shechtman	Chemistry	2011	Technion – Israel Institute of Technology
Charles Scott Sherrington	Physiology or Medicine	1932	University of Oxford
Robert J. Shiller	Economics	2013	Yale University
Osamu Shimomura	Chemistry	2008	Boston University School of Medicine
Osamu Shimomura	Chemistry	2008	Marine Biological Laboratory
Hideki Shirakawa	Chemistry	2000	University of Tsukuba
William Shockley	Physics	1956	Beckman Instruments
Clifford Shull	Physics	1994	Massachusetts Institute of Technology
Kai Siegbahn	Physics	1981	Uppsala University
Manne Siegbahn	Physics	1924	Uppsala University
Herbert A. Simon	Economics	1978	Carnegie Mellon University
Christopher A. Sims	Economics	2011	Princeton University
Jens Christian Skou	Chemistry	1997	Aarhus University
Richard Smalley	Chemistry	1996	Rice University
George E. Smith	Physics	2009	Bell Labs
George P. Smith	Chemistry	2018	University of Missouri
Hamilton O. Smith	Physiology or Medicine	1978	Johns Hopkins School of Medicine
Michael Smith	Chemistry	1993	University of British Columbia
Vernon L. Smith	Economics	2002	George Mason University
Oliver Smithies	Physiology or Medicine	2007	University of North Carolina at Chapel Hill
George Smoot	Physics	2006	University of California, Berkeley
George Davis Snell	Physiology or Medicine	1980	Jackson Laboratory
Kenso Soai	Chemistry	2026	Tokyo University of Science
Frederick Soddy	Chemistry	1921	University of Oxford
Robert Solow	Economics	1987	Massachusetts Institute of Technology
Hans Spemann	Physiology or Medicine	1935	University of Freiburg
Michael Spence	Economics	2001	Stanford University
Roger Wolcott Sperry	Physiology or Medicine	1981	California Institute of Technology
Wendell Meredith Stanley	Chemistry	1946	Rockefeller University
Johannes Stark	Physics	1919	University of Greifswald
Hermann Staudinger	Chemistry	1953	University of Freiburg
William Howard Stein	Chemistry	1972	Rockefeller University
Ralph M. Steinman	Physiology or Medicine	2011	Rockefeller University
Jack Steinberger	Physics	1988	CERN
Thomas A. Steitz	Chemistry	2009	Howard Hughes Medical Institute
Thomas A. Steitz	Chemistry	2009	Yale University
Otto Stern	Physics	1943	Carnegie Mellon University
George Stigler	Economics	1982	University of Chicago
Joseph Stiglitz	Economics	2001	Columbia University
Fraser Stoddart	Chemistry	2016	Northwestern University
Richard Stone	Economics	1984	University of Cambridge
Horst Ludwig Störmer	Physics	1998	Columbia University
Donna Strickland	Physics	2018	University of Waterloo
John William Strutt, 3rd Baron Rayleigh	Physics	1904	Royal Institution
Thomas C. Südhof	Physiology or Medicine	2013	Howard Hughes Medical Institute
Thomas C. Südhof	Physiology or Medicine	2013	Stanford University
John Sulston	Physiology or Medicine	2002	Wellcome Sanger Institute
James B. Sumner	Chemistry	1946	Cornell University
Earl Wilbur Sutherland Jr.	Physiology or Medicine	1971	Vanderbilt University
Akira Suzuki	Chemistry	2010	Hokkaido University
Theodor Svedberg	Chemistry	1926	Uppsala University
Richard Laurence Millington Synge	Chemistry	1952	The Rowett Institute
Albert Szent-Györgyi	Physiology or Medicine	1937	University of Szeged
Jack W. Szostak	Physiology or Medicine	2009	Harvard Medical School
Jack W. Szostak	Physiology or Medicine	2009	Howard Hughes Medical Institute
Jack W. Szostak	Physiology or Medicine	2009	Massachusetts General Hospital
Igor Tamm	Physics	1958	Lebedev Physical Institute
Igor Tamm	Physics	1958	Moscow State University
Koichi Tanaka	Chemistry	2002	Shimadzu
Edward Tatum	Physiology or Medicine	1958	Rockefeller University
Henry Taube	Chemistry	1983	Stanford University
Joseph Hooton Taylor Jr.	Physics	1993	Princeton University
Richard E. Taylor	Physics	1990	Stanford University
Howard Martin Temin	Physiology or Medicine	1975	University of Wisconsin–Madison
Richard Thaler	Economics	2017	University of Chicago
Max Theiler	Physiology or Medicine	1951	Rockefeller Foundation
Hugo Theorell	Physiology or Medicine	1955	Karolinska Institute
E. Donnall Thomas	Physiology or Medicine	1990	Fred Hutchinson Cancer Research Center
George Paget Thomson	Physics	1937	University of London
J. J. Thomson	Physics	1906	University of Cambridge
Kip Thorne	Physics	2017	California Institute of Technology
Kip Thorne	Physics	2017	LIGO Scientific Collaboration
David J. Thouless	Physics	2016	University of Washington
Jan Tinbergen	Economics	1969	Netherlands School of Economics
Nikolaas Tinbergen	Physiology or Medicine	1973	University of Oxford
Samuel C. C. Ting	Physics	1976	Massachusetts Institute of Technology
Jean Tirole	Economics	2014	Toulouse School of Economics
Arne Tiselius	Chemistry	1948	Uppsala University
James Tobin	Economics	1981	Yale University
Alexander R. Todd	Chemistry	1957	University of Cambridge
Shin'ichirō Tomonaga	Physics	1965	University of Tsukuba
Susumu Tonegawa	Physiology or Medicine	1987	Massachusetts Institute of Technology
Charles H. Townes	Physics	1964	Massachusetts Institute of Technology
Roger Y. Tsien	Chemistry	2008	Howard Hughes Medical Institute
Roger Y. Tsien	Chemistry	2008	University of California, San Diego
Daniel C. Tsui	Physics	1998	Princeton University
Harold Urey	Chemistry	1934	Columbia University
John Vane	Physiology or Medicine	1982	Wellcome Research Laboratories
Harold E. Varmus	Physiology or Medicine	1989	UCSF School of Medicine
William Vickrey	Economics	1996	Columbia University
Vincent du Vigneaud	Chemistry	1955	Cornell University
Artturi Ilmari Virtanen	Chemistry	1945	University of Helsinki
John Hasbrouck Van Vleck	Physics	1977	Harvard University
Johannes Diderik van der Waals	Physics	1910	University of Amsterdam
Julius Wagner-Jauregg	Physiology or Medicine	1927	University of Vienna
Selman Waksman	Physiology or Medicine	1952	Rutgers University
George Wald	Physiology or Medicine	1967	Harvard University
John E. Walker	Chemistry	1997	MRC Laboratory of Molecular Biology
Otto Wallach	Chemistry	1910	University of Göttingen
Ernest Walton	Physics	1951	Trinity College Dublin
Otto Heinrich Warburg	Physiology or Medicine	1931	Max Planck Institute for Biology
Arieh Warshel	Chemistry	2013	University of Southern California
James Watson	Physiology or Medicine	1962	Harvard University
Steven Weinberg	Physics	1979	Harvard University
Rainer Weiss	Physics	2017	LIGO Scientific Collaboration
Rainer Weiss	Physics	2017	Massachusetts Institute of Technology
Drew Weissman	Physiology or Medicine	2023	University of Pennsylvania
Thomas Huckle Weller	Physiology or Medicine	1954	Boston Children's Hospital
Alfred Werner	Chemistry	1913	University of Zurich
M. Stanley Whittingham	Chemistry	2019	Binghamton University
George Whipple	Physiology or Medicine	1934	University of Rochester
Heinrich Otto Wieland	Chemistry	1927	LMU Munich
Carl Wieman	Physics	2001	JILA
Wilhelm Wien	Physics	1911	University of Würzburg
Eric F. Wieschaus	Physiology or Medicine	1995	Princeton University
Torsten Wiesel	Physiology or Medicine	1981	Harvard Medical School
Eugene Wigner	Physics	1963	Princeton University
Frank Wilczek	Physics	2004	Massachusetts Institute of Technology
Maurice Wilkins	Physiology or Medicine	1962	University of London
Geoffrey Wilkinson	Chemistry	1973	Imperial College London
Oliver E. Williamson	Economics	2009	University of California, Berkeley
Richard Willstätter	Chemistry	1915	LMU Munich
Charles Thomson Rees Wilson	Physics	1927	University of Cambridge
Kenneth G. Wilson	Physics	1982	Cornell University
Robert B. Wilson	Economics	2020	Stanford University
Robert Woodrow Wilson	Physics	1978	Bell Labs
Adolf Windaus	Chemistry	1928	University of Göttingen
David J. Wineland	Physics	2012	National Institute of Standards and Technology
David J. Wineland	Physics	2012	University of Colorado Boulder
Gregory Winter	Chemistry	2018	MRC Laboratory of Molecular Biology
Georg Wittig	Chemistry	1979	Heidelberg University
Robert Burns Woodward	Chemistry	1965	Harvard University
Kurt Wüthrich	Chemistry	2002	ETH Zurich
Kurt Wüthrich	Chemistry	2002	Scripps Research
Omar M. Yaghi	Chemistry	2025	University of California, Berkeley
Rosalyn Sussman Yalow	Physiology or Medicine	1977	James J. Peters VA Medical Center
Shinya Yamanaka	Physiology or Medicine	2012	Gladstone Institutes
Shinya Yamanaka	Physiology or Medicine	2012	Kyoto University
Chen-ning Yang	Physics	1957	Institute for Advanced Study
Ada Yonath	Chemistry	2009	Weizmann Institute of Science
Akira Yoshino	Chemistry	2019	Asahi Kasei
Akira Yoshino	Chemistry	2019	Meijo University
Michael W. Young	Physiology or Medicine	2011	Rockefeller University
Tu Youyou	Physiology or Medicine	2015	China Academy of Traditional Chinese Medicine
Hideki Yukawa	Physics	1949	Columbia University
Hideki Yukawa	Physics	1949	Kyoto University
Pieter Zeeman	Physics	1902	University of Amsterdam
Anton Zeilinger	Physics	2022	University of Vienna
Frits Zernike	Physics	1953	University of Groningen
Ahmed Zewail	Chemistry	1999	California Institute of Technology
Karl Ziegler	Chemistry	1963	Max Planck Institute for Coal Research
Rolf M. Zinkernagel	Physiology or Medicine	1996	University of Zurich
Richard Adolf Zsigmondy	Chemistry	1925	University of Göttingen
Albert A. Michelson	Physics	1907	Case Western Reserve University
Edward W. Morley	Physics	1907	Case Western Reserve University

== See also ==
- List of Nobel laureates by country
