= Nick Holonyak, Jr. Award =

Award given by Optica

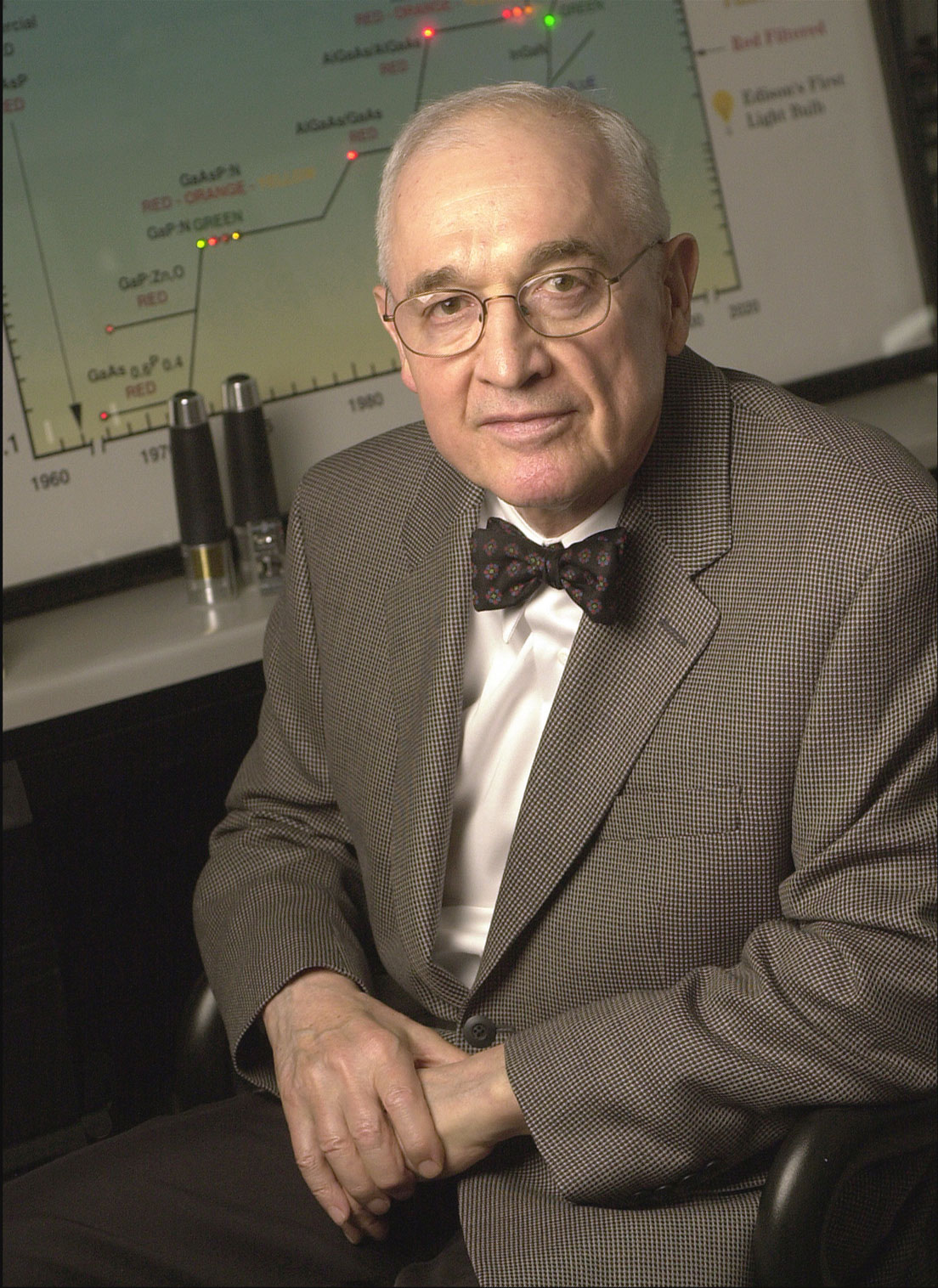
Nick Holonyak, Jr., after whom the award is named

The Nick Holonyak, Jr. Award is presented by Optica "to an individual who has made significant contributions to optics based on semiconductor-based optical devices and materials, including basic science and technological applications." The Award was established in 1997 to honor Nick Holonyak, who made distinguished contributions to the field of optics through the development of semiconductor-based light-emitting diodes and semiconductor lasers.

== Recipients ==
Source: Nick Holonyak, Jr. Award

- 1998 – M. George Craford
- 1999 – Dennis G. Deppe
- 2000 – Zhores Alferov
- 2001 – Shuji Nakamura
- 2002 – Pallab K. Bhattacharya
- 2003 – Joe Charles Campbell
- 2004 – Peter G. Eliseev
- 2005 – P. Daniel Dapkus
- 2006 – James J. Coleman
- 2007 – Constance J. Chang-Hasnain
- 2008 – Kam Yin Lau
- 2009 – John E. Bowers
- 2010 – Dan Botez
- 2011 – Yasuhiko Arakawa
- 2012 – Kent D. Choquette
- 2013 – Alessandro Tredicucci
- 2014 – Ching Wan Tang
- 2015 – Qing Hu
- 2016 – Chennupati Jagadish
- 2017 – Larry A. Coldren
- 2018 – Dieter Bimberg
- 2019 – Fumio Koyama
- 2020 – Kei May Lau
- 2021 – Martin D. Dawson
- 2022 – Marshall Nathan
- 2023 – Yeshaiahu Fainman
- 2024 – Theodore Moustakas
- 2025 – Zetian Mi
- 2026 – Steven DenBaars
