= Tapio Alvesalo =

Finnish businessman

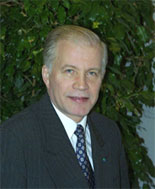
Portrait of Tapio Alvesalo

Dr. Tapio Alvesalo (born November 19, 1943, in Jokioinen, Finland) acted as the Secretary General of the Millennium Prize Foundation (2004–2009) and as the Secretary of the Foundation's International Prize Selection Committee.

Before joining the Millennium Prize Foundation he held the position of Vice President, Corporate Technology at Fortum Corporation until his retirement from that position in 2004.

Dr. Alvesalo has served as a Board Member in a number of high technology companies both within and outside Fortum Corporation.

== Education ==
Dr. Alvesalo earned his M.Sc. degree in technical physics in 1970 and his Ph.D. degree in the field of atomic and solid state physics in 1974 at Helsinki University of Technology.

== Career ==
1970's

In 1975 he was invited to the USA to Cornell University's Laboratory of Atomic and Solid State Physics. He worked at Cornell as a post doctoral research associate in 1975-1978 in collaboration with Professor Robert Coleman Richardson, a Nobel Prize laureate in physics in 1996. After returning to Finland in 1978 Dr. Alvesalo was invited to join Neste Oy, the Finnish national oil company, as a Corporate R&D Officer.

1980's

During 1983-1989 Dr. Alvesalo headed Neste Battery Division's strategic R&D on advanced energy storage technologies and electric vehicle concepts.

In 1986 a new Neste Corporate business venture Neste Advanced Power Systems (NAPS) was launched under Dr. Alvesalo's leadership and management. He acted as the CEO of NAPS in 1986-1998 and as the Chairman of the Board of NAPS International in 1998- 2004. NAPS developed and marketed advanced energy systems based on solar electricity, wind, hydrogen and fuel cell technologies and supplied products to over hundred countries world wide.

1990's

In 1993-1998 Dr. Alvesalo chaired NEMO, the Finnish National Research Program on Advanced Energy Systems and Technologies. He has also acted as the Chairman of the Board of EPIA(European Photovoltaic Industry Association) and as Member of the Board of the Finnish Academies of Technology. In 1993 Dr. Alvesalo was awarded the Medal of Honor, Knight 1. Class, Order of the Lion of Finland, granted by the President of the Republic of Finland.

2000-2010

In 2000, after the merger of Neste Oy with the national power company IVO Oy and the subsequent formation of the Nordic leading energy company, Fortum Corporation, Dr. Alvesalo was appointed Vice President, Corporate Technology. After his retirement in 2004 he was invited to direct the Millennium Prize Foundation and he acted as Seceratery General during 2004-2009.
