= Dan Botez =

Romanian-American electrical engineer

- Born: May 22, 1948 (age 78); Bucharest, Romania
- Occupations: physicist, electrical engineer
- Known for: work and research in high-power semiconductor diode lasers and high-power quantum cascade lasers

Dan Botez (born May 22, 1948, in Bucharest, Romania) is a Romanian-American physicist and electrical engineer known for his work and research in high-power semiconductor diode lasers and high-power quantum cascade lasers. He is Philip Dunham Reed Professor of Electrical Engineering at the University of Wisconsin–Madison and co-editor of the books Diode Laser Arrays and Mid-Infrared and Terahertz Quantum Cascade Lasers. His awards include election as a Fellow of the Institute of Electrical and Electronics Engineers (IEEE) in 1986 and the Optica Nick Holonyak Jr. Award in 2010.

== Education ==
He received his high school degree and baccalaureate at the Matei Basarab National College. At age 20 he won a national scholarship to the United States, where he pursued higher education in electrical engineering. He earned his B.S. degree summa cum laude in 1971, followed by an M.S. in 1972 and a Ph.D. in 1976, all from the University of California, Berkeley.

== Career ==
Following completion of his doctoral studies, Botez joined RCA Laboratories in Princeton, New Jersey from 1977 to 1984, where he developed high-power, single-mode semiconductor diode lasers and introduced design concepts enabling record single-mode, continuous-wave (CW) and quasi-CW powers. In 1979, he received an RCA Outstanding Achievement Award for co-development of high-density optical recording using diode lasers. While at RCA, his work led to commercially devices and patents. In 1984, he received both the Outstanding Young Engineer and Centennial Key to the Future Awards from the IEEE Photonics Society (then the Quantum Electronics and Applications Society).

In addition to his academic research, Botez co-founded the companies Alfalight, Inc. and Intraband, LLC, which focused on the development and commercialization of advanced laser technologies. He also co-founded the Semiconductor Laser Workshop of the IEEE Photonics Society in 1984.

He then joined the TRW Research Center in Redondo Beach, California from 1986 to 1993, as Senior Staff Scientist. During this time, he co-invented resonant leaky-wave coupling and led efforts that achieved watt-level coherent powers from diode lasers. He was elected a Technical Fellow of TRW in 1991.

In 1993, Botez joined the University of Wisconsin–Madison, where he has served as a professor in the Department of Electrical and Computer Engineering and has held a Philip Dunham Reed Professorship. At Wisconsin, he led research programs in diode lasers and quantum cascade lasers, achieving multiple world-record wall-plug efficiencies and output powers. He has also been involved in technology commercialization, including co-founding companies such as Intraband, LLC.

In 1995, Botez was awarded the Doctor Honoris Causa degree and a 175^{th} Anniversary Jubilee Medal by the Politehnica University of Bucharest, Romania

In 2016, he authored the “High-Power, Reliable Diode Lasers and Arrays” chapter in the OSA Century of Optics book celebrating the first hundred years of the Optical Society of America (OSA).

In 2025, he retired from the Department of Electrical and Computer Engineering.

== Awards ==
- 1984, Outstanding Young Engineer Award of the IEEE Photonics Society
- 1986, Fellow of the IEEE
- 1995, Fellow of Optica
- 2010, Optica Nick Holonyak Jr Award
- 2021, Legend Talk, IEEE ISLC Conference
