= Isamu Akasaki =

Japanese materials scientist (1929–2021)

- 赤崎 勇
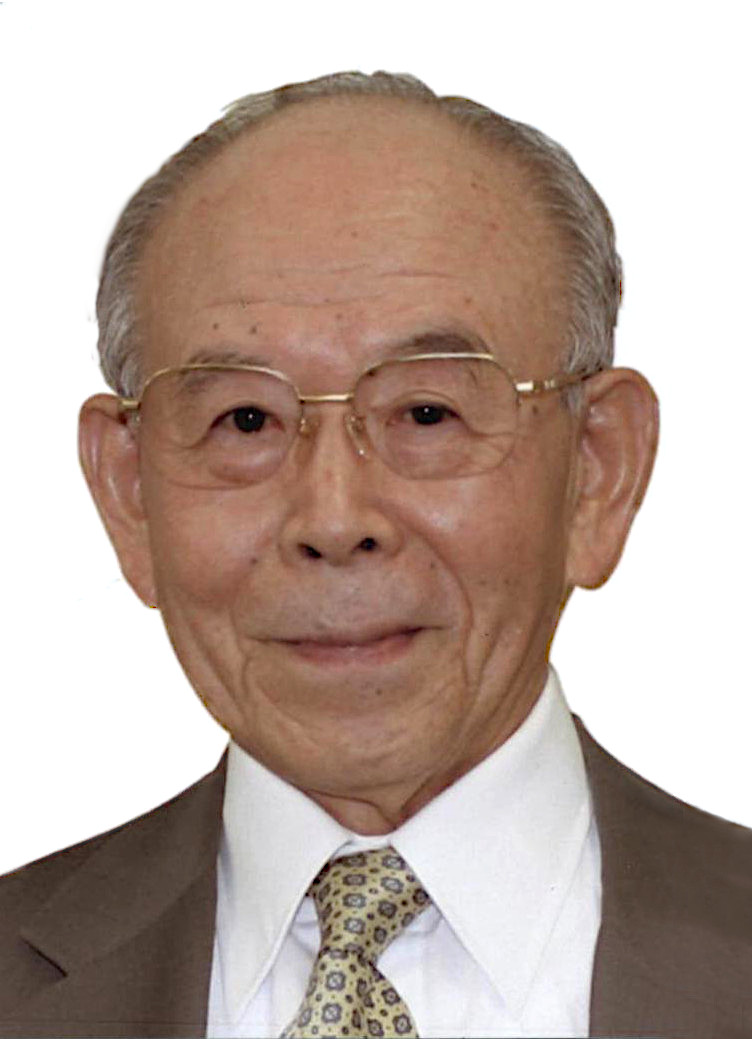
- Akasaki in 2011
- Born: January 30, 1929; Chiran, Japan
- Died: April 1, 2021 (aged 92); Nagoya, Japan
- Education: Kyoto University: B.S., Chemistry; Nagoya University: Dr.Eng., Electronics
- Known for: Blue LEDs
- Spouse: Ryoko Akasaki
- Awards: IEEE Jack A. Morton Award (1998); Rank Prize for Optoelectronics (1998); C&C Prize (1998); Gordon E. Moore Medal for Outstanding Achievement in Solid State Science and Technology (1999); Asahi Prize (2000); Kyoto Prize in Advanced Technology (2009); IEEE Edison Medal (2011); Karl Ferdinand Braun Prize (2013); Nobel Prize in Physics (2014); Charles Stark Draper Prize (2015); Asia Game Changer Award (2015); Asian Scientist 100 (2016); Queen Elizabeth Prize for Engineering (2021)
- Scientific career
- Fields: Materials science
- Workplaces: Kobe Kogyo Corporation; Nagoya University; Meijo University
- Thesis: Geの気相成長に関する研究 (1964)
- Doctoral students: Hiroshi Amano

Isamu Akasaki (赤崎 勇, Akasaki Isamu; January 30, 1929 – April 1, 2021) was a Japanese materials scientist specializing in the field of semiconductor technology. He is best known for co-inventing the bright gallium nitride (GaN) p–n junction blue LED in 1989 and subsequently the high-brightness GaN blue LED as well.

Akasaki was awarded the 2014 Nobel Prize in Physics, along with Hiroshi Amano and Shuji Nakamura, "for the invention of efficient blue light-emitting diodes which has enabled bright and energy-saving white light sources."

== Early life and education ==
Isamu Akasaki was born on January 30, 1929, in Chiran, Japan, and was raised in Kagoshima. His elder brother is Masanori Akazaki, who was an electronic engineering researcher and a Professor Emeritus at Kyushu University. (Their surname "赤﨑" is also pronounced Akazaki.)

In 1949, Akasaki entered the Faculty of Science at Kyoto University. During his university years, he visited shrines and temples that local residents rarely visit, walked around the mountains of Shinshu during the summer vacation, enjoyed classes and enjoyed a fulfilling student era. In 1952, he graduated from the Department of Chemistry at Kyoto with a Bachelor of Science.

== Career ==
In 1952, Akasaki joined the research staff of the Kobe Kogyo Corporation (now Fujitsu Ltd.). From 1959 to 1964, he worked at Nagoya University, where he was Research Associate, Assistant Professor, and Associate Professor in the Department of Electronics. In 1964, he received a Doctor of Engineering from Nagoya for a thesis on the vapor-phase epitaxial growth of germanium (Ge). After obtaining his doctorate, he joined Matsushita Research Institute Tokyo, Inc., where he became head of the Basic Research Laboratory IV and then general manager of the Semiconductor Department. In 1981, Akasaki returned to Nagoya University as a professor.

In 1992, Akasaki became a professor in the Graduate School of Science and Technology at Meijo University. He was appointed director of the Research Center for Nitride Semiconductor Core Technologies in 2011.

From 1987 to 1990, Akasaki was a project leader of "Research and Development of GaN-based Blue Light–Emitting Diode" sponsored by the Japan Science and Technology Agency (JST). He then led the "Research and Development of GaN-based Short-Wavelength Semiconductor Laser Diode" product sponsored by JST from 1993 to 1999. While he led this project, he was also a visiting professor at the Research Center for Interface Quantum Electronics at Hokkaido University, from 1995 to 1996. In 1996 he was a project leader of the Japan Society for the Promotion of Science's for the "Future program" up to 2001. From 1996 he started as a Project Leader of "High-Tech Research Center for Nitride Semiconductors" at Meijo University, sponsored by MEXT until 2004. From 2003 up to 2006 he was the chairman of "R&D Strategic Committee on the Wireless Devices Based on Nitride Semiconductors" sponsored by METI.

== Research ==
Akasaki started working on GaN-based blue LEDs in the late 1960s. Step by step, he improved the quality of GaN crystals and device structures at Matsushita Research Institute Tokyo, Inc. (MRIT), where he decided to adopt metalorganic vapor phase epitaxy (MOVPE) as the preferred growth method for GaN.

In 1981, Akasaki started afresh the growth of GaN by MOVPE at Nagoya University, and in 1985 he and his group succeeded in growing high-quality GaN on sapphire substrate by pioneering the low-temperature (LT) buffer layer technology.

This high-quality GaN enabled them to discover p-type GaN by doping with magnesium (Mg) and subsequent activation by electron irradiation (1989), to produce the first GaN p-n junction blue/UV LED (1989), and to achieve conductivity control of n-type GaN (1990) and related alloys (1991) by doping with silicon (Si), enabling the use of hetero structures and multiple quantum wells in the design and structure of more efficient p-n junction light emitting structures.

They achieved stimulated emission from the GaN firstly at room temperature in 1990, and developed in 1995 the stimulated emission at 388 nm with pulsed current injection from high-quality AlGaN/GaN/GaInN quantum well device. They verified quantum size effect (1991) and quantum confined Stark effect (1997) in nitride system, and in 2000 showed theoretically the orientation dependence of piezoelectric field and the existence of non-/semi-polar GaN crystals, which have triggered today's worldwide efforts to grow those crystals for application to more efficient light emitters.

== Nagoya University Akasaki Institute ==
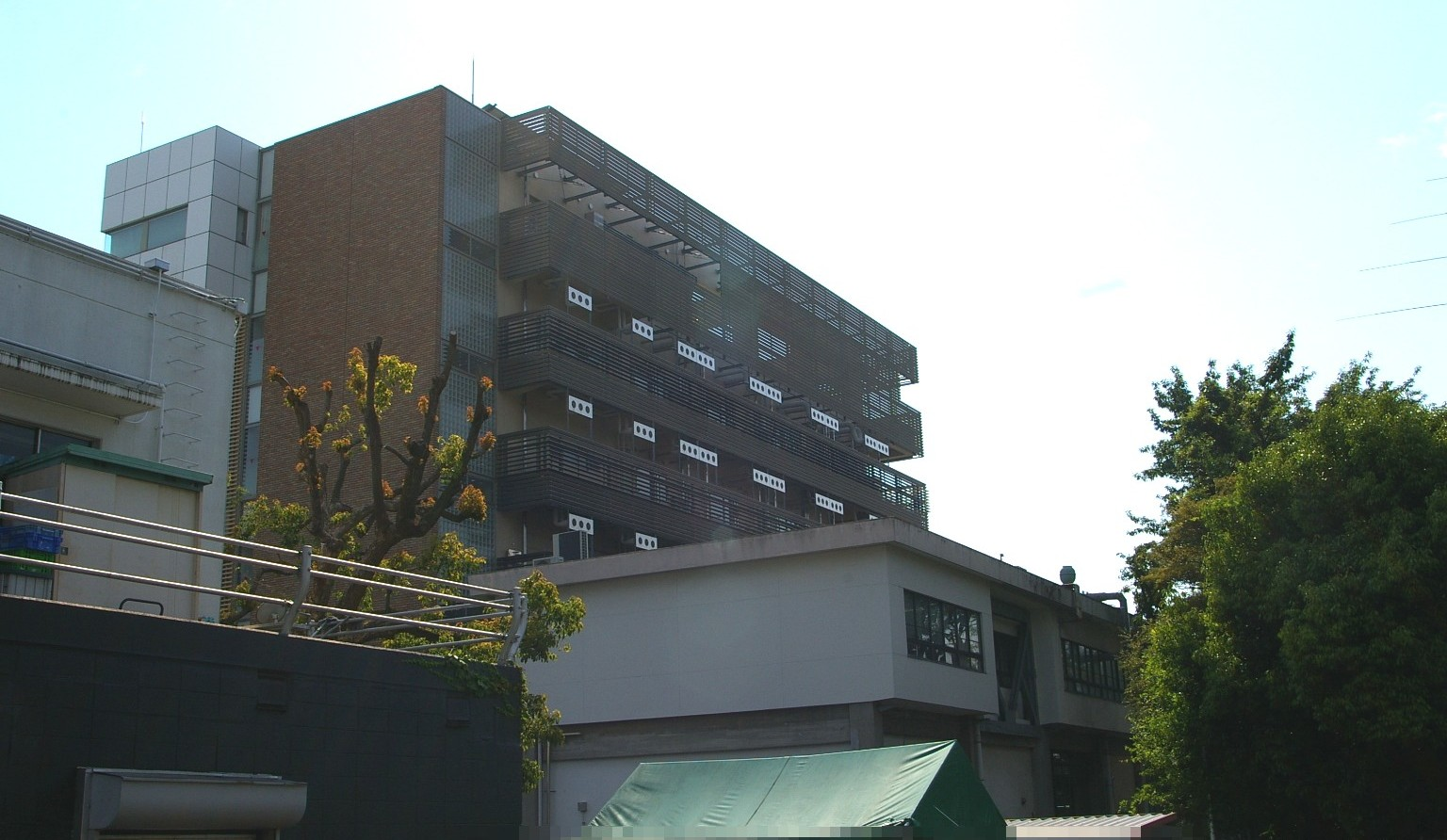
Akasaki Institute, Nagoya University

Akasaki's patents were produced from these inventions, and the patents have been rewarded as royalties. Nagoya University Akasaki Institute opened on October 20, 2006. The cost of construction of the institute was covered with the patent royalty income to the university, which was also used for a wide range of activities in Nagoya University. The institute consists of an LED gallery to display the history of blue LED research/developments and applications, an office for research collaboration, laboratories for innovative research, and Akasaki's office on the top sixth floor. The institute is situated in the center of the collaboration research zone in Nagoya University Higashiyama campus.

== Personal life ==
He and his wife Ryoko lived in Nagoya, and the couple had no children.

== Death ==
Akasaki died from pneumonia at a hospital in Nagoya on April 1, 2021, at the age of 92.

== Recognition ==
=== Awards ===
Year	Organization	Award	Co-recipients	Citation	Ref.
1998	Institute of Electrical and Electronics Engineers	IEEE Jack A. Morton Award	Shuji Nakamura	"For contributions in the field of group-III nitride materials and devices."	
1998	Rank Foundation	Rank Prize for Optoelectronics	Hiroshi Amano, Shuji Nakamura, and Jacques I. Pankove	"For contributions to the invention of nitride based blue and green semiconductor diode lasers."	
1998	NEC C&C Foundation	C&C Prize	Shuji Nakamura	"For basic and pioneering contributions to the development of high brightness and long lifetime blue light-emitting devices using nitride-based compound semiconductors."	
1999	Electrochemical Society	Gordon E. Moore Medal for Outstanding Achievement in Solid State Science and Technology	—	—	
2000	The Asahi Shimbun	Asahi Prize	Shuji Nakamura	"For their research and development of a blue light emitting device."	
2006	The Minerals, Metals & Materials Society	John Bardeen Award	—	"For his pioneering work and key discoveries in the field of GaN and related materials which has enabled their widespread development and use."	
2009	Inamori Foundation	Kyoto Prize in Advanced Technology	—	"[For] Pioneering Work on Gallium Nitride p-n Junctions and Related Contributions to the Development of Blue Light Emitting Devices."	
2011	Institute of Electrical and Electronics Engineers	IEEE Edison Medal	—	"For seminal and pioneering contributions to the development of nitride-based semiconductor materials and optoelectronic devices, including visible wave length LEDs and lasers."	
2013	Society for Information Display	Karl Ferdinand Braun Prize	—	—	
2014	Royal Swedish Academy of Sciences	Nobel Prize in Physics	Hiroshi Amano and Shuji Nakamura	"For the invention of efficient blue light-emitting diodes which has enabled bright and energy-saving white light sources."	
2015	National Academy of Engineering	Charles Stark Draper Prize	M. George Craford, Russell Dupuis, Nick Holonyak, and Shuji Nakamura	"For the invention, development, and commercialization of materials and processes for light-emitting diodes (LEDs)."	
2015	Asia Society	Asia Game Changer Award	Hiroshi Amano and Shuji Nakamura	"For lighting our world in a groundbreaking and sustainable way."	
2016	Asian Scientist	Asian Scientist 100	—	—	
2021	Queen Elizabeth Prize for Engineering Foundation	Queen Elizabeth Prize for Engineering	M. George Craford, Russell Dupuis, Nick Holonyak, and Shuji Nakamura	"For the creation and development of LED lighting, which forms the basis of all solid state lighting technology."	

=== Memberships ===
Year	Organization	Type	Ref.
1999	Institute of Electrical and Electronics Engineers	Fellow	
2008	National Academy of Engineering	International Member	
2014	Japan Academy	Member	

=== Honors ===
Year	Country	Honor	Ref.
2011	Japan	Order of Culture	

== See also ==
- List of Japanese Nobel laureates
- List of Nobel laureates affiliated with Kyoto University
