= Shuji Nakamura =

Japanese–American electrical engineer (born 1954)

- 中村修二
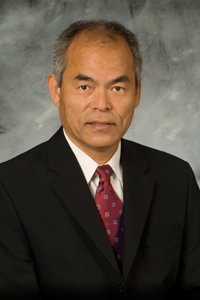
- Nakamura in 2014
- Born: May 22, 1954 (age 72); Ikata, Japan
- Citizenship: Japan (until 2005); United States (since 2005)
- Education: University of Tokushima: B.Eng., Electrical Engineering; M.S., Electrical Engineering; Ph.D., Electrical Engineering
- Known for: Blue and white LEDs
- Spouse: Yuki Nakamura
- Awards: IEEE Jack A. Morton Award (1998); Rank Prize for Optoelectronics (1998); Asahi Prize (2000); Nick Holonyak, Jr. Award (2001); Karl Ferdinand Braun Prize (2004); Millennium Technology Prize (2006); Prince of Asturias Award for Technical and Scientific Research (2008); Harvey Prize (2009); Nobel Prize in Physics (2014); Charles Stark Draper Prize (2015); Global Energy Prize (2015); Asia Game Changer Award (2015); Asian Scientist 100 (2016); Mountbatten Medal (2017); Queen Elizabeth Prize for Engineering (2021)
- Scientific career
- Fields: Electrical engineering
- Workplaces: Nichia; University of California, Santa Barbara

Shuji Nakamura (中村 修二, Nakamura Shūji; born May 22, 1954) is a Japanese–American electrical engineer and co-inventor of the blue LED, a major breakthrough in lighting technology. For this achievement, Nakamura, together with Isamu Akasaki and Hiroshi Amano, received the Nobel Prize in Physics in 2014.

Nakamura specializes in the field of semiconductor technology. He is Professor of Materials and of Electrical and Computer Engineering at the University of California, Santa Barbara (UCSB) since 1999.

== Career and research ==
Shuji Nakamura was born on May 22, 1954, in Ikata, Ehime Prefecture, Japan. In 1973, he entered the University of Tokushima, where he received his Bachelor of Engineering and Master of Science degrees in Electrical Engineering in 1977 and 1979, respectively. Nakamura joined the Nichia Corporation in 1979, also based in Tokushima. It was while working for Nichia that Nakamura invented the method for producing the first commercial high brightness gallium nitride (GaN) LED whose brilliant blue light, when partially converted to yellow by a phosphor coating, is the key to white LED lighting, which went into production in 1993.

Previously, J. I. Pankove and co-workers at RCA put in considerable effort but did not make a marketable GaN LED in the 1960s. The principal problem was the difficulty of making strongly p-type GaN. Nakamura drew on the work of another Japanese group led by Professor Isamu Akasaki, who published their method to make strongly p-type GaN by electron-beam irradiation of magnesium-doped GaN; however, this method was not suitable for mass production. Nakamura developed a thermal annealing method much more suitable for mass production. In addition, he and his co-workers worked out the physics and pointed out the culprit was hydrogen, which passivated acceptors in GaN.

At the time, many considered creating a GaN LED too difficult to produce; therefore, Nakamura was fortunate that the founder of Nichia, Nobuo Ogawa (1912–2002), was willing to support and fund his GaN project. However, the senior Ogawa ceded the presidency to his son-in-law Eiji Ogawa (in 1989). The company under Eiji's direction ordered him to suspend work on GaN, claiming it was consuming too much time and money. Nakamura continued to develop the blue LED on his own and in 1993 succeeded in making the device.

Despite these circumstances, once Nakamura succeeded in creating a commercially viable prototype, 3 orders of magnitude (1000 times) brighter than previously successful blue LEDs, Nichia pursued developing the marketable product. The company's gross receipt surged from just over ¥20 billion (≈US$200 million) in 1993 to ¥80 billion (≈US$800 million) by 2001, 60 percent of which was accounted for by sales of blue LED products. The company's workforce doubled between 1994 and 1999 from 640 to 1300 employees.

In 1994, the University of Tokushima conferred Nakamura a Doctor of Philosophy by publication.

Nakamura left Nichia Corporation in 1999 to join the faculty at the University of California, Santa Barbara at the personal invitation of the university's chancellor, Henry T. Yang. Yang flew three times from California to Japan to recruit Nakamura, with promises to build new research facilities and having a Japanese-speaking research staff team already assembled for him.

In 2001, Nakamura sued his former employer Nichia over his bonus for the discovery as a part of a series of lawsuits between Nichia and Nakamura with Nichia's US competitor Cree Inc.; they agreed in 2000 to jointly sue Nichia at the expense of Cree and Nakamura received stock options from Cree. Nakamura claimed that he received only ¥20,000 (≈US$180) for his discovery of "404 patent," though Nichia's president Eiji Ogawa's side of the story was that he was shocked beyond belief that the court would award Nakamura ¥20 billion, and downplaying the significance of the "404 patent," opined that the company had adequately compensated him for the innovation through promotions and bonuses amounting to ¥62 million over 11 years and annual salary which was raised to ¥20 million by the time Nakamura quit Nichia.

Nakamura sued for ¥2 billion (<US$20 million) as his fair share for the invention, and the district court awarded him ten times the amount, ¥20 billion (<US$200 million). However, Nichia appealed the award and the parties settled in 2005 for ¥840 million (≈US$8.1 million, less than 5% of the award amount), which was still the largest payment ever paid by a Japanese company to an employee for an invention, an amount only enough to cover legal expenses incurred by Nakamura. In line with the lawsuit, Nakamura has repeatedly criticized Japanese companies for not giving their researchers the salaries and recognition they deserve.

Nakamura has also worked on green LEDs and is responsible for creating the white LED and blue laser diodes used in Blu-ray Discs and HD DVDs.

Nakamura is a professor of Materials at the UCSB. In 2008, Nakamura, along with fellow UCSB professors Dr. Steven P. DenBaars and Dr. James Speck, founded Soraa, a developer of solid-state lighting technology built on pure gallium nitride substrates. Nakamura holds 208 US utility patents as of 5 May 2020.

In November 2022, Nakamura co-founded a commercial fusion company, Blue Laser Fusion, with Hiroaki Ohta, a former president of Tokyo-based drone maker ACSL. In July 2023, Blue Laser Fusion raised $25 million from venture capital firm JAFCO Group and the Mirai Creation Fund, which is backed by Toyota Motor and other investors and managed by the SPARX Group.

== Personal life ==
Nakamura is married to Yuki Nakamura.

== Recognition ==
=== Awards ===
Year	Organization	Award	Co-recipients	Citation	Ref.
1998	Institute of Electrical and Electronics Engineers	IEEE Jack A. Morton Award	Isamu Akasaki	"For contributions in the field of group-III nitride materials and devices."	
1998	Rank Foundation	Rank Prize for Optoelectronics	Isamu Akasaki, Hiroshi Amano, and Jacques I. Pankove	"For contributions to the invention of nitride based blue and green semiconductor diode lasers."	
2000	The Asahi Shimbun	Asahi Prize	Isamu Akasaki	"For their research and development of a blue light emitting device."	
2001	Optical Society of America	Nick Holonyak, Jr. Award	—	"For original demonstration and commercialization of GaN-based semiconductor lasers and LEDs."	
2004	Society for Information Display	Karl Ferdinand Braun Prize	—	—	
2006	Technology Academy Finland	Millennium Technology Prize	—	—	
2008	Prince of Asturias Foundation	Prince of Asturias Award for Technical and Scientific Research	Sumio Iijima, Robert S. Langer, Tobin J. Marks, and George M. Whitesides	—	
2009	Technion – Israel Institute of Technology	Harvey Prize	—	"In recognition of his seminal contribution to nitride containing white light LEDs which revolutionize energy efficient lighting system."	
2014	Royal Swedish Academy of Sciences	Nobel Prize in Physics	Isamu Akasaki and Hiroshi Amano	"For the invention of efficient blue light-emitting diodes which has enabled bright and energy-saving white light sources."	
2015	National Academy of Engineering	Charles Stark Draper Prize	Isamu Akasaki, M. George Craford, Russell Dupuis, and Nick Holonyak	"For the invention, development, and commercialization of materials and processes for light-emitting diodes (LEDs)."	
2015	Global Energy Association	Global Energy Prize	—	"For the invention, commercialization and development of energy-efficient white LED lighting technology."	
2015	Asia Society	Asia Game Changer Award	Isamu Akasaki and Hiroshi Amano	"For lighting our world in a groundbreaking and sustainable way."	
2016	Asian Scientist	Asian Scientist 100	—	—	
2017	Institution of Engineering and Technology	Mountbatten Medal	—	—	
2021	Queen Elizabeth Prize for Engineering Foundation	Queen Elizabeth Prize for Engineering	Isamu Akasaki, M. George Craford, Russell Dupuis, and Nick Holonyak	"For the creation and development of LED lighting, which forms the basis of all solid state lighting technology."	
2022	American Academy of Achievement	Golden Plate Award	—	—	

=== Memberships ===
Year	Organization	Type	Ref.
2003	National Academy of Engineering	Member	
2019	Royal Academy of Engineering	International Fellow	

=== Honorary degrees ===
Year	University	Degree	Ref.
2008	Hong Kong University of Science and Technology	Doctor of Engineering	
2017	University of Warsaw	—	
2018	Queen's University Belfast	Doctor of Science	
2018	University of Massachusetts Lowell	Doctor of Humane Letters	
2020	University of Macau	Doctor of Science	
2025	McGill University	Doctor of Science	
2026	University of Oxford	TBA	

=== Honors ===
Year	Country	Honor	Ref.
2014	Japan	Order of Culture	

== See also ==
- List of Japanese Nobel laureates and nominees

Preceded by Tim Berners-Lee	Millennium Technology Prize winner 2006 (for blue and white LEDs)	Succeeded by Robert S. Langer
