= Meijo University =

Higher education institution in Gifu Prefecture, Japan

- 名城大学
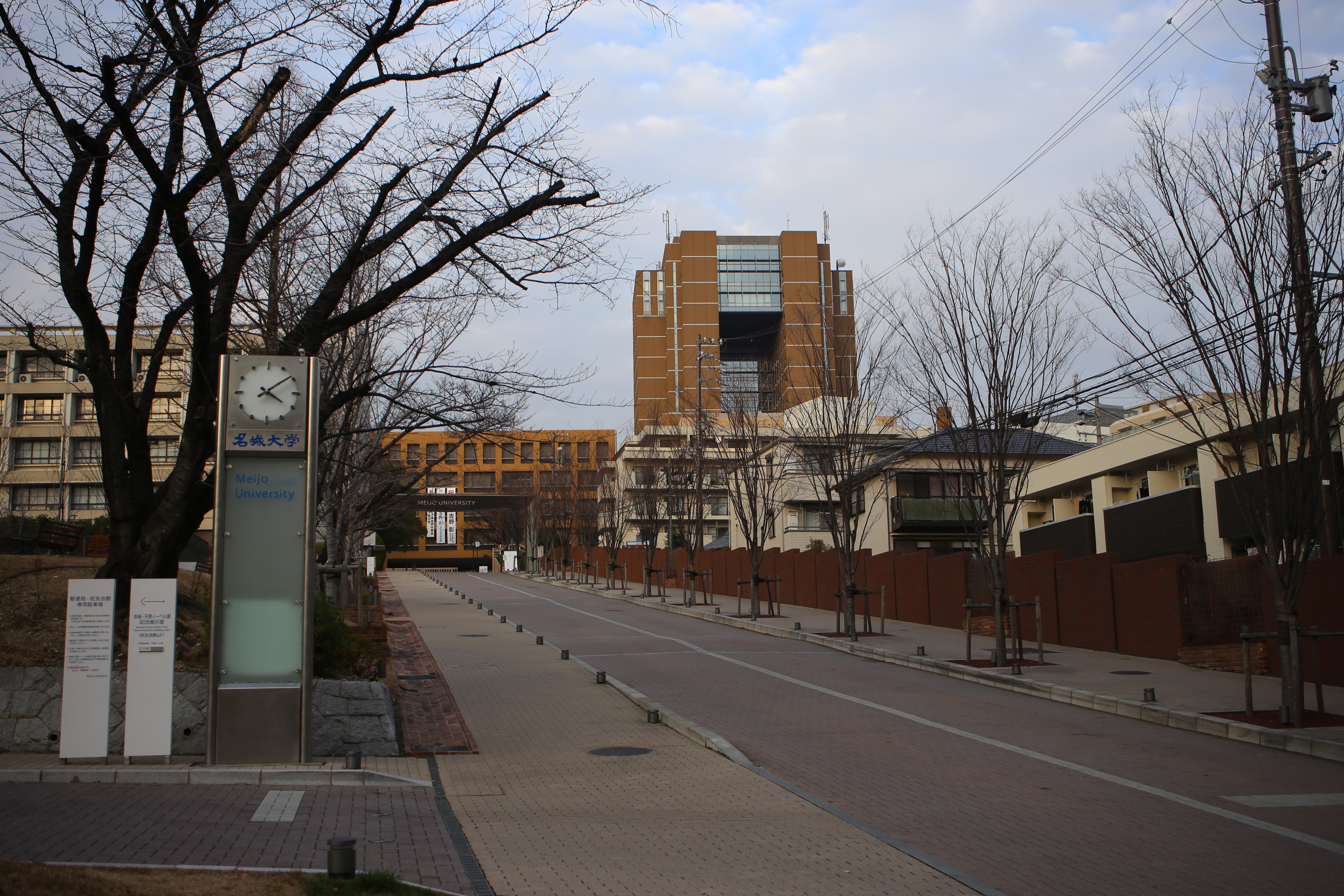
- Tempaku campus in Meijo University
- Type: Private
- Established: May 1926
- Affiliations: Japan Private Universities FD Coalition Forum
- President: Mitsunori Noguchi
- Location: Aichi Prefecture Japan; 35.136°N 136.976°E; 35.411°N 137.013°E
- Campus: Multiple campuses Tenpaku（Main）: Tempaku Yagoto : Tempaku Nagoya Dome : Higashi Kasugai : Kasugai Nisshin : Nisshin Satellite: Nakamura
- Colors
- Website: www.meijo-u.ac.jp/english/index.html

Meijo University (名城大学, Meijō daigaku) is a private university in Japan. Its main campus is in Tempaku-ku, Nagoya, Aichi Prefecture, and it has two other campuses in Nagoya, Aichi Prefecture. It had two faculty members who were Nobel laureates as of 2021.

== History ==
The name Meijō derives itself from the abbreviated form of Nagoya Castle (名古屋城, Nagoya-jō).

The predecessor of the school was founded by Juichi Tanaka in May 1926; 100 years ago; it was chartered as a university in 1949. It is the largest university in the Chūkyō Metropolitan Area.

== Campus ==
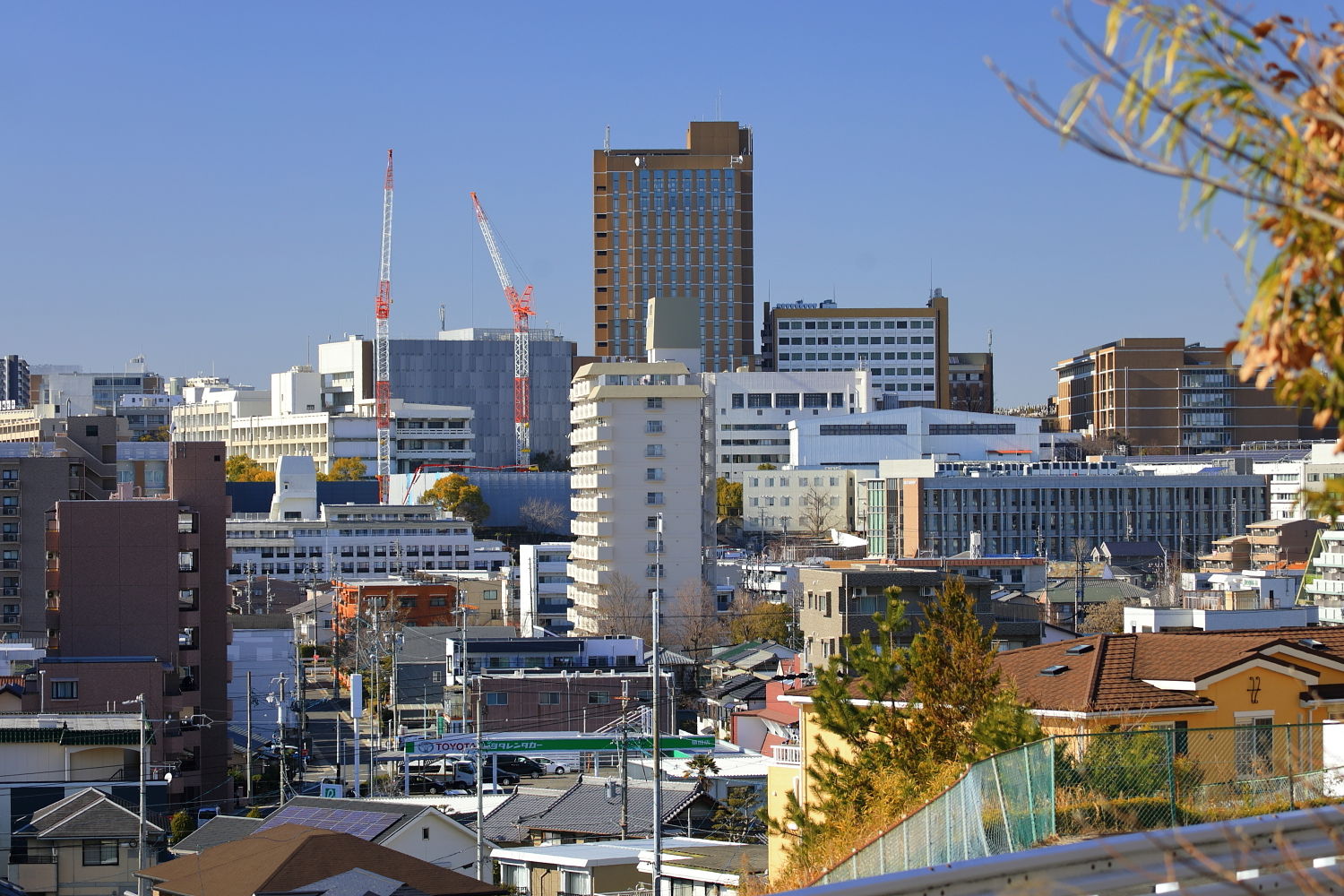
Tenpaku campus（Main）

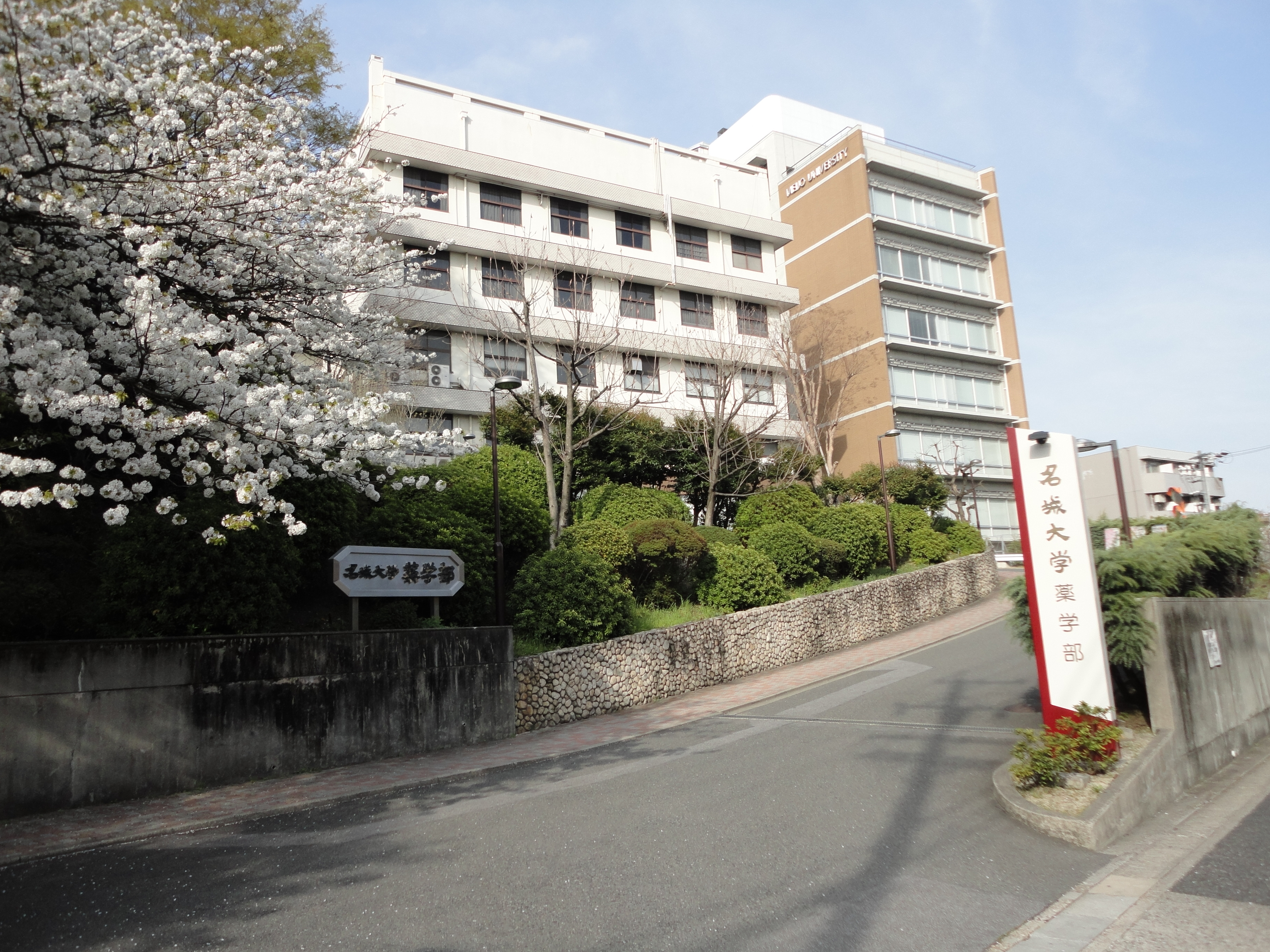
Yagoto campus

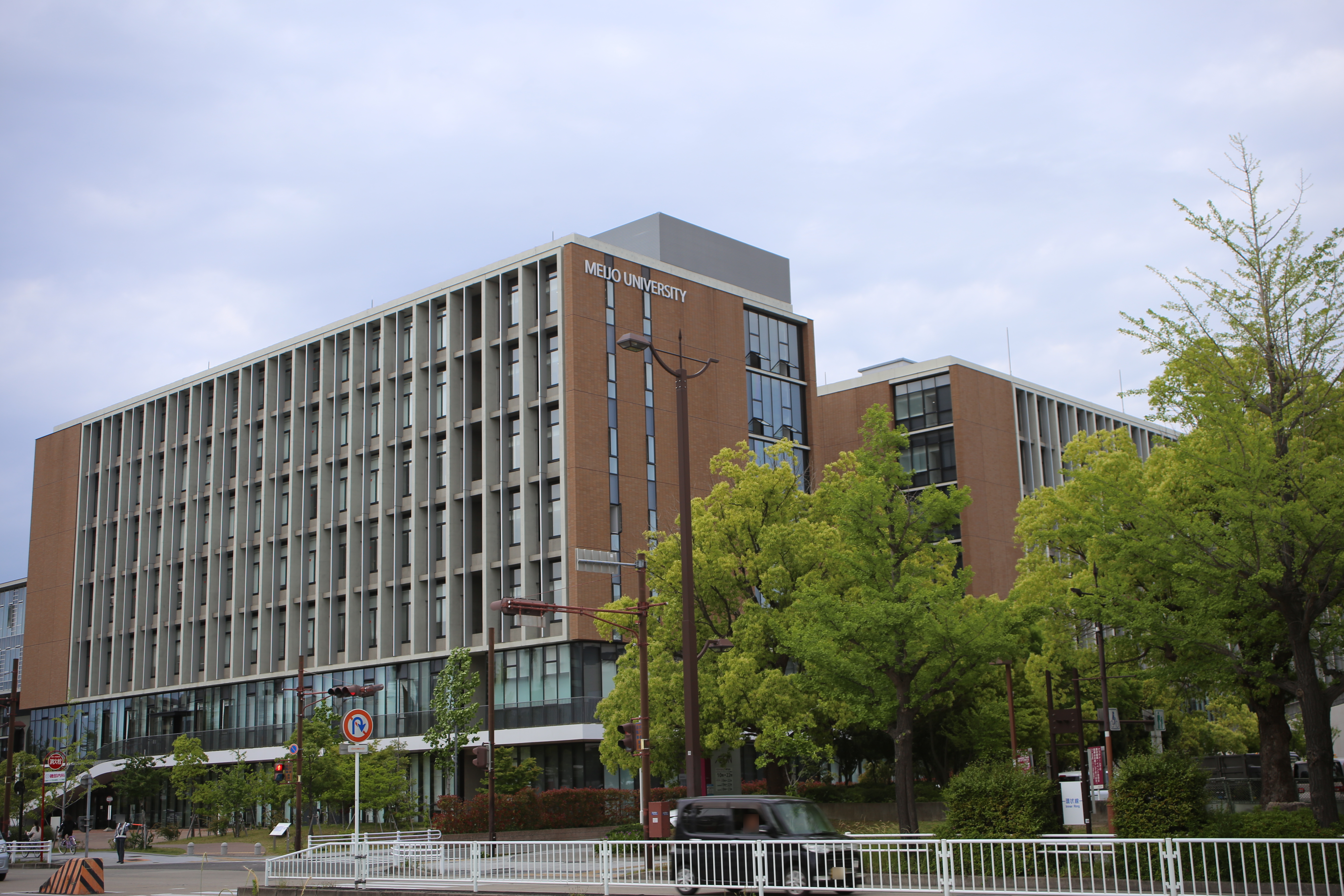
Nagoya Dome campus

== Notable faculty ==
- Ryōji Noyori, guest professor of Meijo University, awarded the 2001 Nobel Prize in Chemistry
- Sumio Iijima, tenured professor of Meijo University, scientist, awarded the 2008 Kavli Prize, the 2009 Order of Culture and so on
- Isamu Akasaki, tenured professor of Meijo University, scientist, awarded the 2014 Nobel Prize in Physics
- Hiroshi Amano, former professor of Meijo University, awarded the 2014 Nobel Prize in Physics
- Akira Yoshino, professor of Meijo University, chemist, awarded the 2014 Charles Stark Draper Prize and the 2019 Nobel Prize in Chemistry
- Fumitada Itakura, former professor of Meijo University, scientist, awarded the 2005 IEEE Jack S. Kilby Signal Processing Medal
- Katsuyoshi Kato, Lawyer

== Notable graduates ==
- Yoshihiro Sato, boxer
- Tatsutoshi Goto, professional wrestler
- Takuya Kirimoto, actor

== See also ==
- Shiogamaguchi Station
- Yagoto Station
- Nishi Kani Station
