= Technology Academy Finland =

Technology Academy Finland (formerly Millennium Prize Foundation and Finnish Technology Award Foundation) is an independent foundation established in 2003 by Finnish industry and the Government of Finland in partnership.

The foundation's objectives include promoting Finland as a high-tech country by strengthening and bringing together domestic and international networks, actively participating in public discussion and encouraging children and young people to study technology, natural sciences and mathematics. Technology Academy Finland's actions reflect the principles of Corporate social responsibility (CSR), and it is a participant of United Nations Global Compact initiative.

Technology Academy Finland awards the biennial, 1-million euro Millennium Technology Prize and grants other rewards The foundation also runs associated events like Millennium Innovation Forum. The patron of the Millennium Technology Prize is the President of Finland.

== See also ==
- Tapio Alvesalo
