= Hiroshi Amano =

Japanese electrical engineer (born 1960)

- 天野 浩
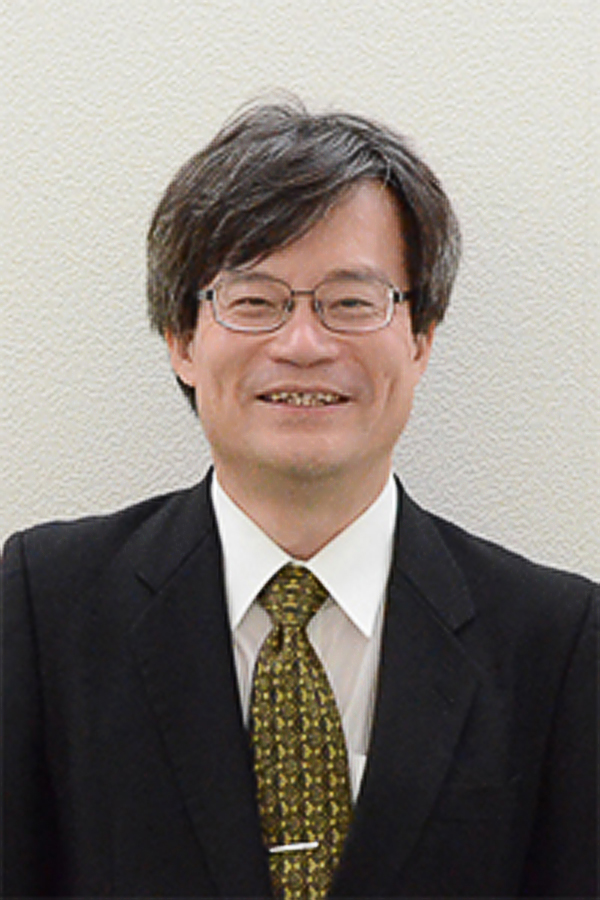
- Born: September 11, 1960 (age 66); Hamamatsu, Japan
- Education: Nagoya University: B.Eng., Electrical Engineering; M.Eng., Electrical Engineering; Dr.Eng., Electrical Engineering
- Known for: Blue LEDs
- Awards: Rank Prize for Optoelectronics (1998); Nobel Prize in Physics (2014); Asia Game Changer Award (2015); Asian Scientist 100 (2016)
- Scientific career
- Fields: Electrical engineering
- Workplaces: Nagoya University; Meijo University
- Thesis: GaNのMOVPE成長と光電物性及び青色発光素子への応用に関する研究 (1989)
- Doctoral advisor: Isamu Akasaki

Hiroshi Amano (天野 浩, Amano Hiroshi; born September 11, 1960) is a Japanese electrical engineer specializing in the field of semiconductor technology. He is a co-inventor of the blue LED, for which he was awarded the 2014 Nobel Prize in Physics along with Isamu Akasaki and Shuji Nakamura.

== Biography ==
Hiroshi Amano was born on September 11, 1960, in Hamamatsu, Shizuoka Prefecture, Japan, the son of Yoshiko and Tatsuji Amano.

In 1979, Amano entered Nagoya University as a student of the Department of Electrical Engineering, graduating with a Bachelor of Engineering in 1983. He then went to the Graduate School of Engineering, where he received a Master of Engineering in 1985 and a Doctor of Engineering in 1989.

In 1988, Amano became Research Associate in the School of Engineering at Nagoya University. From 1992 to 2010, he was Assistant Professor, Associate Professor, and Professor in the Faculty of Science and Technology at Meijo University. In 2010, he returned to Nagoya University, where he is currently a professor in the Graduate School of Engineering. Amano has been Director of the Akasaki Research Center at Nagoya since 2011.

== Research ==
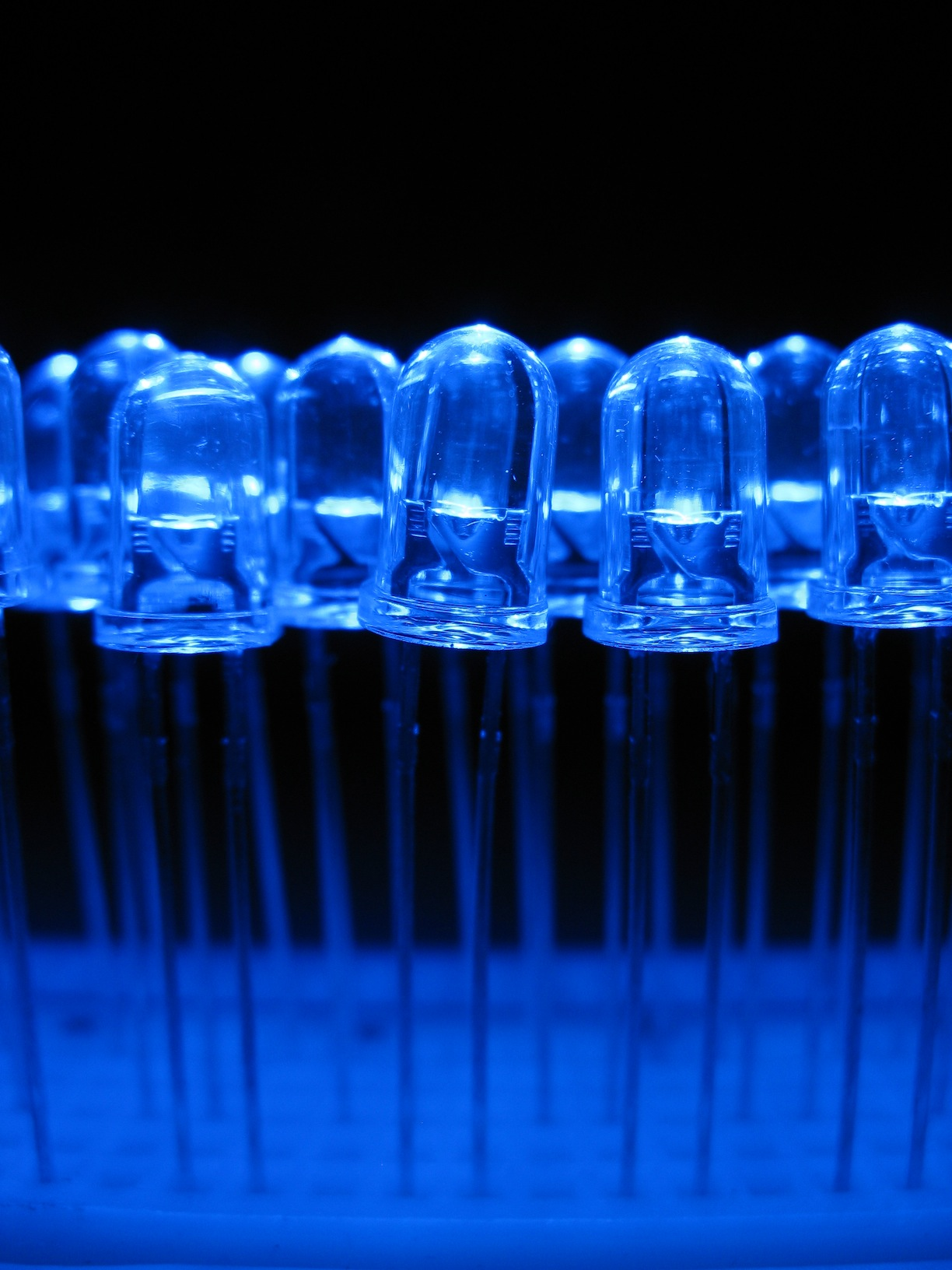
Blue light-emitting diodes

Amano joined Professor Isamu Akasaki's group in 1982 as an undergraduate student. Since then, he has been doing research on the growth, characterization, and device applications of group-III-nitride semiconductors, which are well known as materials used in blue light-emitting diodes (LEDs) today. In 1985, he developed low-temperature deposited buffer layers for the growth of group-III-nitride semiconductor films on a sapphire substrate, which led to the realization of group-III-nitride semiconductor-based LEDs and laser diodes. In 1989, he succeeded in growing p-type GaN and fabricating a p-n-junction-type GaN-based UV/blue LED for the first time in the world.

Known to be keen on research, Amano's laboratory was always lit late at night, such as weekdays, holidays, New Year's Day, and was called "no night castle". According to his students in the laboratory, Amano has an optimistic and temperate personality, and is never angry.

== Family ==
Amano's wife was a Japanese lecturer at Comenius University in Bratislava, Slovakia.

== Recognition ==
=== Awards ===
| Year | Organization | Award | Co-recipients | Citation | Ref. |
|---|---|---|---|---|---|
| 1998 | Rank Foundation | Rank Prize for Optoelectronics | Isamu Akasaki, Shuji Nakamura, and Jacques I. Pankove | "For contributions to the invention of nitride based blue and green semiconductor diode lasers." | |
| 2014 | Royal Swedish Academy of Sciences | Nobel Prize in Physics | Isamu Akasaki and Shuji Nakamura | "For the invention of efficient blue light-emitting diodes which has enabled bright and energy-saving white light sources." | |
| 2015 | Asia Society | Asia Game Changer Award | Isamu Akasaki and Shuji Nakamura | "For lighting our world in a groundbreaking and sustainable way." | |
| 2016 | Asian Scientist | Asian Scientist 100 | — | — | |

=== Memberships ===
| Year | Organization | Type | Ref. |
|---|---|---|---|
| 2009 | Japan Society of Applied Physics | Fellow | |
| 2015 | American Physical Society | Fellow | |
| 2016 | National Academy of Engineering | International Member | |
| 2019 | Chinese Academy of Engineering | Foreign Academician | |
| 2022 | Japan Academy | Member | |

=== Honorary degrees ===
| Year | University | Ref. |
|---|---|---|
| 2016 | University of Padua | |
| 2017 | Linköping University | |
| 2025 | University of Milano-Bicocca | |

== Selected publications ==
- Amano, H.; Sawaki, N.; Akasaki, I.; Toyoda, Y. (February 3, 1986). "Metalorganic vapor phase epitaxial growth of a high quality GaN film using an AlN buffer layer". Applied Physics Letters. 48 (5). AIP Publishing: 353–355. Bibcode:1986ApPhL..48..353A. doi:10.1063/1.96549. ISSN 0003-6951.
- Amano, Hiroshi; Akasaki, Isamu; Kozawa, Takahiro; Hiramatsu, Kazumasa; Sawaki, Nobuhiko; Ikeda, Kousuke; Ishii, Yoshikazu (1988). "Electron beam effects on blue luminescence of zinc-doped GaN". Journal of Luminescence. 40–41. Elsevier BV: 121–122. Bibcode:1988JLum...40..121A. doi:10.1016/0022-2313(88)90117-2. ISSN 0022-2313.
- Amano, Hiroshi; Kito, Masahiro; Hiramatsu, Kazumasa; Akasaki, Isamu (December 20, 1989). "P-Type Conduction in Mg-Doped GaN Treated with Low-Energy Electron Beam Irradiation (LEEBI)". Japanese Journal of Applied Physics. 28 (Part 2, No. 12). Japan Society of Applied Physics: L2112–L2114. Bibcode:1989JaJAP..28L2112A. doi:10.1143/jjap.28.l2112. ISSN 0021-4922.
- Murakami, Hiroshi; Asahi, Tsunemori; Amano, Hiroshi; Hiramatsu, Kazumasa; Sawaki, Nobuhiko; Akasaki, Isamu (1991). "Growth of Si-doped Al_{x}Ga_{1–x}N on (0001) sapphire substrate by metalorganic vapor phase epitaxy". Journal of Crystal Growth. 115 (1–4). Elsevier BV: 648–651. Bibcode:1991JCrGr.115..648M. doi:10.1016/0022-0248(91)90820-u. ISSN 0022-0248.
- Itoh, Kenji; Kawamoto, Takeshi; Amano, Hiroshi; Hiramatsu, Kazumasa; Akasaki, Isamu (September 15, 1991). "Metalorganic Vapor Phase Epitaxial Growth and Properties of GaN/Al0.1Ga0.9N Layered Structures". Japanese Journal of Applied Physics. 30 (Part 1, No. 9A). Japan Society of Applied Physics: 1924–1927. Bibcode:1991JaJAP..30.1924I. doi:10.1143/jjap.30.1924. ISSN 0021-4922. S2CID 123428785.
- I. Akasaki, H. Amano, K. Itoh, N. Koide & K. Manabe, Int. Phys. Conf. Ser. 129, 851 (1992).
- Akasaki, Isamu; Amano, Hiroshi; Sota, Shigetoshi; Sakai, Hiromitsu; Tanaka, Toshiyuki; Koike, Masayoshi (November 1, 1995). "Stimulated Emission by Current Injection from an AlGaN/GaN/GaInN Quantum Well Device". Japanese Journal of Applied Physics. 34 (11B) L1517. Japan Society of Applied Physics. doi:10.7567/jjap.34.l1517. ISSN 0021-4922. S2CID 122963134.

== See also ==
- List of Japanese Nobel laureates
