= M. George Craford =

American electrical engineer

M. George Craford (born December 29, 1938) is an American electrical engineer known for his work in Light Emitting Diodes (LEDs).

Raised in an Iowa farming community, he studied physics at the University of Iowa, where he earned his BA in 1961. Craford received his MS (1963) and PhD (1967) degrees in physics from the University of Illinois at Urbana–Champaign in 1967, began his professional career at the Monsanto Chemical Company, where he discovered the "Yellow light". When Monsanto sold its LED and compound semiconductor business in 1979, Craford went to Hewlett Packard, where in 1982 he became the research and development manager of the HP Optoelectronics Division. When Lumileds Lighting (now Philips Lumileds Lighting Company) spun out from HP in 1999, Craford was named the company's Chief Technical Officer (CTO).

In 1972 Craford invented the first yellow LED as well as red and red-orange LEDs. At Monsanto, his group developed nitrogen-doped GaAsP, and at HP pioneered development of AlInGaP LEDs and developed AlGaAs and InGaN products. More recently, his team implemented compound semiconductor wafer bonding to create devices with efficiencies exceeding incandescent and halogen lights.

Craford was elected a member of the National Academy of Engineering in 1994 for contributions to light-emitting-diode (LED) materials and devices, including the first yellow LED. He is also an IEEE Fellow and recipient of the 2002 National Medal of Technology and 1995 IEEE Morris N. Liebmann Memorial Award, as well as awards from the Optical Society of America, Materials Research Society (MRS), and Electrochemical Society for his LED research. He received the IEEE Edison Medal, 2017 for a career of meritorious achievement in electrical science, electrical engineering, or the electrical arts.

The Queen Elizabeth Prize for Engineering was awarded to Isamu Akasaki, Shuji Nakamura, Nick Holonyak Jr, M. George Craford and Russell Dupuis for the creation and development of LED lighting, which forms the basis of all solid state lighting technology.
