= Doris Roberts =

American actress (1925–2016)

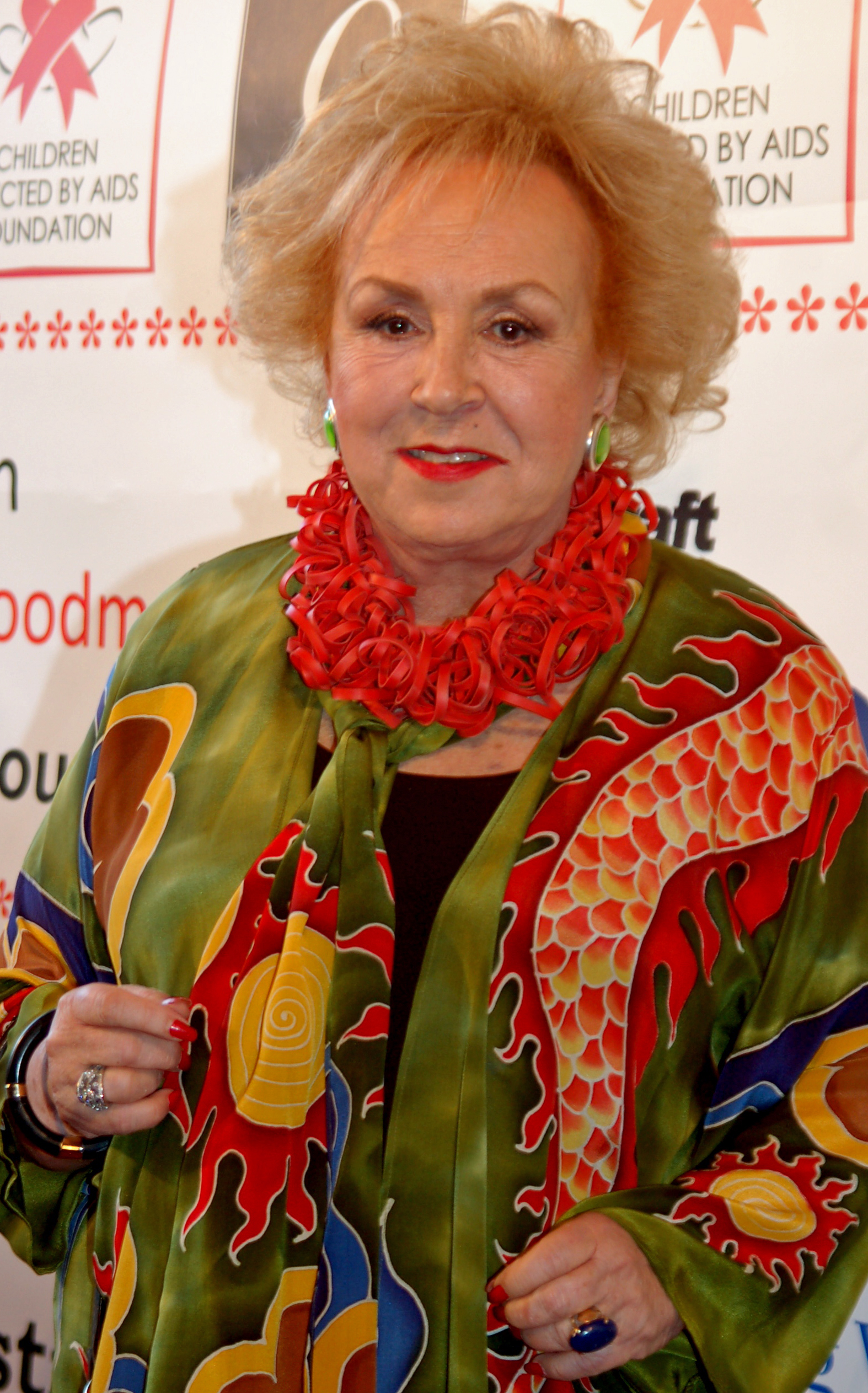
- Roberts in 2011
- Born: Doris May Green; November 4, 1925; St. Louis, Missouri, U.S.
- Died: April 17, 2016 (aged 90); Los Angeles, California, U.S.
- Occupations: Actress; comedian
- Years active: 1948–2016
- Political party: Democratic
- Spouses: Michael E. Cannata (m. 1956; div. 1962) William Goyen (m. 1963; died 1983)
- Children: 1

Doris May Roberts (née Green; November 4, 1925 — April 17, 2016) was an American actress and comedian whose career spanned seven decades of television and film. She received five Emmy Awards and a Screen Actors Guild award during her acting career, which began in 1948.

Roberts studied acting at The Neighborhood Playhouse School of the Theatre in New York City and started in films in 1961. She had several prominent film roles, including playing opposite Shirley Stoler in The Honeymoon Killers (1970), Elliott Gould in Little Murders (1971), Carol Kane in Hester Street (1975), Billy Crystal in Rabbit Test (1978), Robert Carradine in Number One with a Bullet (1987), Cady McClain in Simple Justice (1989), among many others.

Roberts achieved continuing success in television, becoming known for her role as Mildred Krebs in NBC's Remington Steele from 1983 to 1987 and achieved worldwide recognition for her co-starring role as the matriarch, Marie Barone, on the CBS sitcom Everybody Loves Raymond (1996–2005). Towards the end of her acting career, Roberts also had a prominent role opposite Tyler Perry in Madea's Witness Protection (2012), and The Middle.

Roberts appeared as a guest on many talk and variety shows, as well as a panelist on several game shows. She was an advocate of animal rights and animal rights activism, supporting groups such as the United Activists for Animal Rights.

== Early life ==
Doris May Green was born in St. Louis, Missouri, to a family of Russian-Jewish immigrants. She was raised by her mother, Ann (née Meltzer), and her maternal grandparents in The Bronx, New York, after her father, Larry Green, deserted the family. Roberts' stepfather, whose surname she took as her own, was Chester H. Roberts. Chester and Roberts' mother operated the Z. L. Rosenfield Agency, a stenographic service catering to playwrights and actors. By her teens, Roberts was renowned for her skill as a typist and would assist with the family business. Ruth Finley was one such client who recalls her typing up final copies of The Fashion Calendar for print.

== Career ==
=== Film and television ===
Roberts' acting career began in 1948 with a role on the TV series Studio One. She appeared in episodes of The Naked City (1958-1963), Way Out (1961), Ben Casey (1963), and The Defenders (1962-1963). In 1961, Roberts made her film debut in Something Wild (1961).

Roberts appeared in such 1960s/1970s films as A Lovely Way to Die, No Way to Treat a Lady, The Honeymoon Killers, Such Good Friends, Little Murders, A New Leaf, The Heartbreak Kid, The Taking of Pelham One Two Three, Hester Street, and Rabbit Test. In 1978, she appeared in a film about John F. Kennedy's assassination, Ruby and Oswald, in which Roberts played Jack Ruby's sister. She also appeared briefly in The Rose, as the mother of the title character (Bette Midler). Roberts had a very memorable, but uncredited role as the maid in "Barefoot in the Park" in 1967, with Robert Redford.

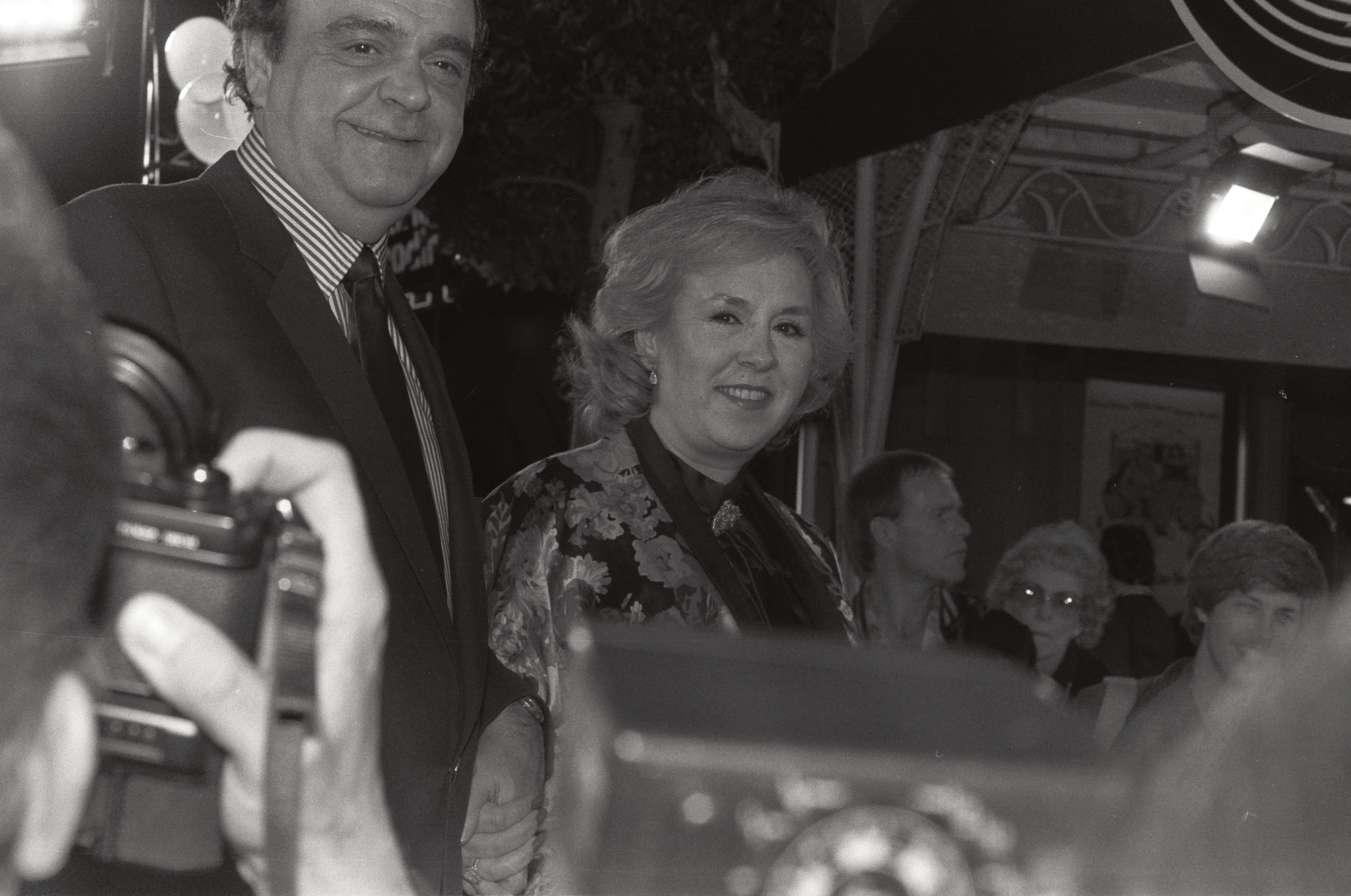
Roberts in 1980 at the premiere of Seems Like Old Times, taken by Alan Light

In an interview with the Archive of American Television, Rue McClanahan confirmed that in 1972, McClanahan was approached by Norman Lear during the taping of an All in the Family episode to be a late replacement for Roberts, who was originally intended for the role of Vivian on Maude. Roberts later guest starred in a 1976 All in the Family episode, "Edith's Night Out" as a bar patron who befriended Edith.

Roberts also appeared on Alice, playing the mother of the title character (played by her former Broadway co-star Linda Lavin); on Barney Miller in two different roles, as the wife of a man who secretly visits a sex surrogate, and (in three episodes) as the harried wife of a middle-aged man who occasionally makes erratic decisions to give his life meaning. Roberts played the unhinged Flo Flotsky on four episodes of Soap, and Dorelda Doremus, a faith healer, on Mary Hartman, Mary Hartman. Roberts played Theresa Falco on Angie, and later appeared as Mildred Krebs on NBC's Remington Steele from 1983-1987.

After Remington Steele ended, Roberts starred in several films including the TV film remake of If It's Tuesday, It Still Must Be Belgium (1987), Number One with a Bullet (1987), Simple Justice (1989), National Lampoon's Christmas Vacation (1989), and Used People (1992). She also appeared on Full House as Danny Tanner's mother, Claire, as well as two episodes of Murder, She Wrote, and as lonely Aunt Edna on Step by Step among others.

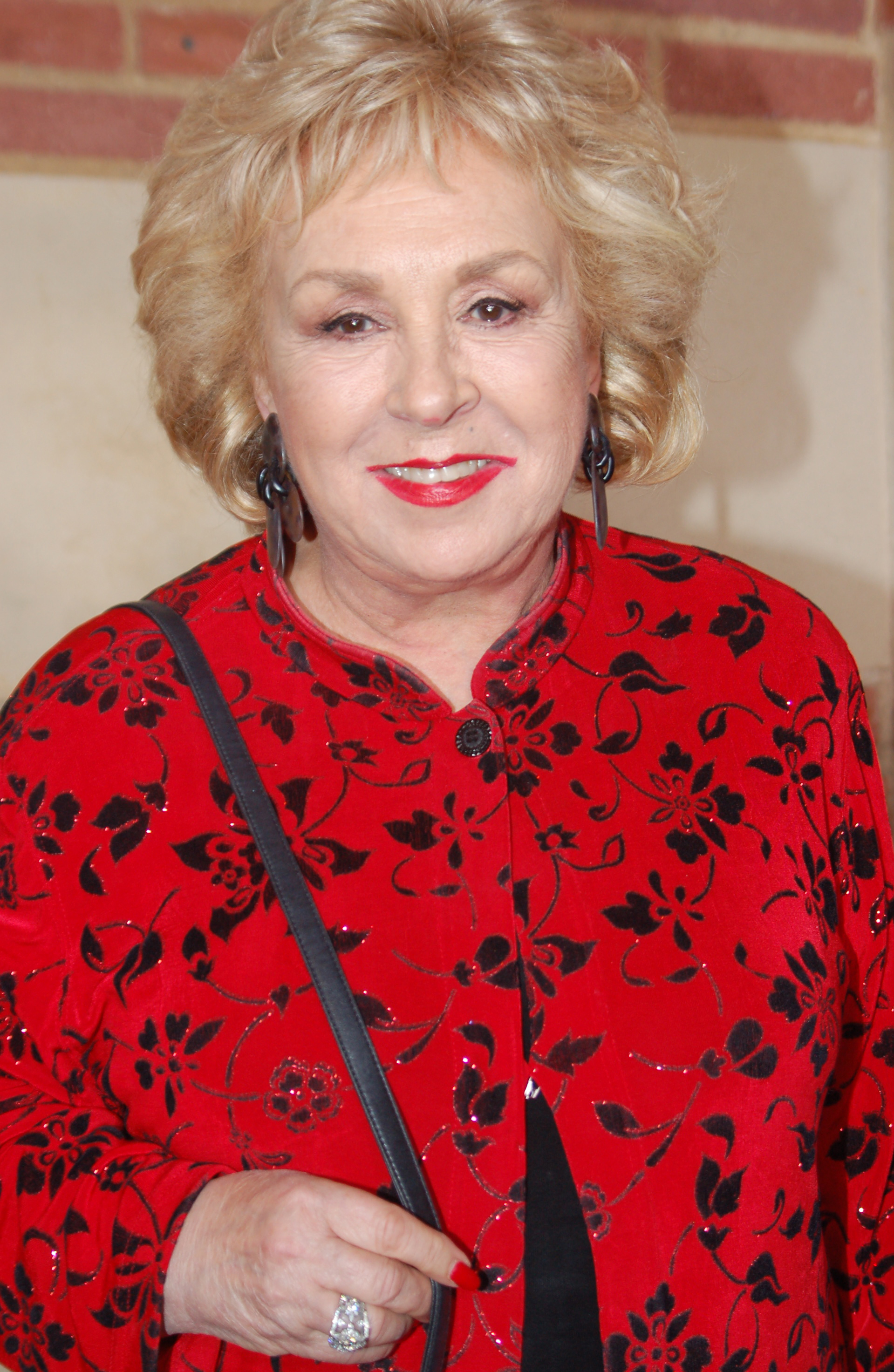
Roberts in December 2010

Roberts achieved much of her fame for her role as Marie Barone on Everybody Loves Raymond, which ran on CBS from 1996 to 2005. Roberts was reportedly one of 100 actresses considered for the role. For her work on the series, Roberts was nominated for seven Emmy Awards (and won four times) for Outstanding Supporting Actress in a Comedy Series. She had previously won an Emmy for a guest appearance on St. Elsewhere, playing a homeless woman, and was also once nominated for her role on Remington Steele. Roberts was nominated for appearances on Perfect Strangers and a PBS special called The Sunset Gang.

In 2003, Roberts made a guest appearance as Gordo's grandmother in Lizzie McGuire. That same year, she received a star on the Hollywood Walk of Fame. In 2006, Roberts starred in Our House as a wealthy woman who took in homeless people into her own house, and in Grandma's Boy.

In 2007, Roberts made a guest appearance on Law & Order: Criminal Intent. Two years later, she appeared in the romantic comedy Play the Game alongside Andy Griffith, who plays a lonely widowed grandfather re-entering the dating world after a 60-year hiatus, and in the science fiction comedy Aliens in the Attic, which was filmed in Auckland, New Zealand. Roberts starred as Emily Merkle (Mrs. Miracle) in the Hallmark television film Mrs. Miracle (2009) and its sequel, Call Me Mrs. Miracle (2010).

On September 23, 2010, Roberts played Ms. Rinsky, Brick Heck's teacher in the second-season premiere episode of The Middle. This appearance reunited her with Patricia Heaton, her co-star from Everybody Loves Raymond. Roberts returned in two other episodes that season, "The Math Class" and the finale, "Back to Summer". In 2012, she played George Needleman's mother in Tyler Perry's Madea's Witness Protection. In 2013, Roberts was a special guest star in the Major Crimes episode "There’s No Place Like Home".

=== Stage ===
Roberts' stage career began in the 1950s on Broadway. She appeared in numerous Broadway shows including William Saroyan's The Time of Your Life, William Marchant's The Desk Set (with Shirley Booth), Neil Simon's The Last of the Red Hot Lovers (with James Coco and Linda Lavin) and Terrence McNally's Bad Habits. Roberts starred in McNally's Unusual Acts of Devotion at the LaJolla Playhouse in June 2009.

== Honors ==
In May 2005, Roberts received an honorary doctorate of fine arts from the University of South Carolina. She was awarded a trophy and certificate on her induction into the Bronx Walk of Fame on 24 June 2007 at the Paradise Theatre, the Grand Concourse, the Bronx, New York. She was awarded the Ellis Island Medal of Honor on May 7, 2011. Roberts was awarded a star on the Hollywood Walk of Fame in February 2003, at 7021 Hollywood Blvd.

== Advocacy and other work ==
On September 4, 2002, Roberts testified before a U.S. Congressional panel that age discrimination was prevalent in Hollywood. She was a registered Democrat.

An animal rights advocate, Roberts worked with the group Puppies Behind Bars, which works with inmates in training guide dogs and assistance dogs for the physically disabled and elderly, as well as dogs trained in explosives detection to be used by law enforcement agencies. She was also active with the Children with AIDS Foundation, where she served as chairwoman.

With Danelle Morton, Roberts wrote Are You Hungry, Dear? Life, Laughs, and Lasagna. The book was published by St. Martin's Press in 2003, and serves as a memoir as well as a collection of some of Roberts' recipes.

== Personal life ==
Roberts married Michael Cannata in 1956; they divorced in 1962. They had a son. She has three grandchildren. Roberts' second husband was writer William Goyen and they were married from 1963 until his death from leukemia in 1983.

== Death ==
Roberts died in her sleep on April 17, 2016, at her home in Los Angeles following a stroke, at age 90. Roberts also suffered from pulmonary hypertension for many years before her death. Just a month after her death, Roberts was memorialized in New York City, where a public tribute was held at the Ambassador Theatre, where she appeared in 1972 in The Secret Affairs of Mildred Wild with Maureen Stapleton. Among the stars attending the service were Ray Romano and Patricia Heaton (her co-stars from Everybody Loves Raymond) and actor David Hyde Pierce. Romano said of Roberts:

Doris Roberts had an energy and a spirit that amazed me. She never stopped. Whether working professionally or with her many charities, or just nurturing and mentoring a green young comic trying to make it as an actor, she did everything with such a grand love for life and people and I will miss her dearly.

In another interview, Romano jokingly referred to the kissing thing that Roberts would do off camera: "You know how great she was then!" He also added: "We had a little get together for her. She was one of a kind. She can outwork it, outdrink it, good kisser, I was joking! I appreciated her." Just a month after her death, Romano said:

Here's how good she was: She played the most intrusive, overbearing, nosy woman—always starting fights and whatnot and meddling in our business—and yet when I asked the fans who their favorite character was, all the time it was her. She was so good at portraying the love that was underneath.

Roberts was interred at Pierce Brothers Westwood Village Memorial Park and Mortuary in Los Angeles, California.

== Filmography ==
=== Film ===
Year	Title	Role	Notes	Ref.
1961	Something Wild	Mary Ann's Co-Worker		
1964	Dear Heart	Desk Clerk	Uncredited	
1967	Barefoot in the Park	Hotel Maid	Uncredited	
1967	Divorce American Style	Hypnotic Subject	Uncredited	
1968	No Way to Treat a Lady	Sylvia Poppie		
1968	A Lovely Way to Die	Feeney	Uncredited	
1970	The Honeymoon Killers	Bunny		
1971	Little Murders	Mrs. Chamberlain		
1971	A New Leaf	Mrs. Traggert		
1971	Such Good Friends	Mrs. Gold		
1972	The Heartbreak Kid	Mrs. Cantrow		
1974	The Taking of Pelham One Two Three	Jessie, Mayor's Wife		
1975	Hester Street	Mrs. Kavarsky		
1975	Blood Bath	Mrs. Lambert		
1978	Rabbit Test	Mrs. Carpenter		
1978	Once in Paris...	Brady's ex-Wife		
1979	Good Luck, Miss Wyckoff	Marie		
1979	The Rose	Mrs. Foster	Loosely based on the life of singer Janis Joplin	
1987	Number One with a Bullet	Mrs. Barzak		
1989	National Lampoon's Christmas Vacation	Frances Smith		
1989	Simple Justice	Anna DiLorenzo		
1990	The Ladies on Sweet Street	Bea		
1992	Used People	Aunt Lonnie		
1993	The Night We Never Met	Lion's Den Nosy Neighbor		
1994	Taffy			
1995	The Grass Harp	Mrs. Richards		
1997	Walking to Waldheim	Mina Goldblatt	Short drama film	
1997	Sea World and Busch Gardens Adventures: Alien Vacation!	Marie		
1998	My Giant	Rose Kaminski		
1998	A Fish in the Bathtub	Frieda		
1998	The Secret of NIMH 2: Timmy to the Rescue	Auntie Shrew	Voice	
2001	All Over the Guy	Esther		
2003	Dickie Roberts: Former Child Star	Peggy Roberts		
2006	Grandma's Boy	Grandma Lilly		
2006	I-See-You.Com	Doris Bellinger		
2006	Keeping Up with the Steins	Rose Fielder		
2009	Play the Game	Rose Sherman		
2009	Aliens in the Attic	Nana Rose Pearson		
2010	Another Harvest Moon	Alice		
2012	Margarine Wars	Grandma Betty Johansson		
2012	Madea's Witness Protection	Barbara		
2014	The Little Rascals Save the Day	Grandma		
2015	No Deposit	Kat Nugent		
2015	The Secret of Joy	Grandma	Short	
2016	The Red Maple Leaf	Mrs. Samantha Adams	Posthumous release	
2016	The Escort	Margaret	Short; posthumous release	
2016	Job's Daughter	Ruth Morrison	Posthumous release (final feature film role)	
2018	Zizi and Honeyboy	Zizi	Short; posthumous release (final role)	

=== Television ===
Year	Title	Role	Notes
1951	Starlight Theatre	Operator	Episode: "Act of God Notwithstanding"
1952	Studio One in Hollywood	The Madwoman	Episode: "Jane Eyre"
1952	Suspense	Woman	Episode: "A Time on Innocence"
1954	Look Up and Live	Minnah	Episode: "Rider Number Six"
1961	'Way Out	Edna	Episode: "Side Show"
1962	Naked City	Miss Tresant	Episode: "One of the Most Important Men in the Whole World"
1963	Ben Casey	Claire Forest	Episode: "Father Was an Intern"
1969	CBS Playhouse	Shimmy	Episode: "Shadow Game"
1975	The Mary Tyler Moore Show	Helen Ferrell	Episode: "Phyllis Whips Inflation"
1975	Medical Center	Gladys Callahan	Episode: "Two Against Death"
1975	Baretta	Mrs. Asher	Episode: "Sharper Than a Serpent's Tooth"
1976	All in the Family	Marge	Episode: "Edith's Night Out"
1976	Viva Valdez	Gladys	Episode: "The Nurse's Pipes"
1976	Mary Hartman, Mary Hartman	Dorelda Doremus	3 episodes
1976	The Streets of San Francisco	Mrs. Strauss	"The Thrill Killers" (Parts I and II)
1976	Family	Etta	Episode: "Home Movie"
1976	Rhoda	Sylvia Levy	Episode: "Meet the Levys"
1977	It Happened One Christmas	Ma Bailey	TV movie
1978–1980	Barney Miller	Louise Kaufmann, Harriet Brauer	4 episodes
1978	Soap	Flo Flotsky	4 episodes
1979–1980	Angie	Theresa Falco	36 episodes (actress); 1 episode (director)
1979	Fantasy Island	Marjorie Gibbs	Episode: "Goose for the Gander/The Stuntman"
1980	The Diary of Anne Frank	Mrs. Van Daan	TV movie
1980	Fantasy Island	Madam Clooney	Episode: "Delphine/The Unkillable"
1980	The Love Boat	Rose	Episode: "Sergeant Bull"
1981–1982	Maggie	Loretta	8 episodes
1981–1982	Alice	Mona Spivak	2 episodes
1982	St. Elsewhere	Cora	Episode: "Cora and Arnie"
1983	Romance Theatre	Maggie	5 episodes
1983	Cagney & Lacey	Helen Freitas	Episode: "Jane Doe #37"
1983–1987	Remington Steele	Mildred Krebs	Recurring: season 2, main role: seasons 3-5 (71 episodes)
1985	California Girls	Mrs. Bowzer	Television film
1985	Shelley Duvall's Faerie Tale Theatre	Mother Pig	Episode: "The Three Little Pigs" season 4: episode 1
1986	Mr. Belvedere	Judge Westphall	Episode: "Deportation: Part 2"
1989	Perfect Strangers	Mrs. Bailey	Episode: "Maid to Order"
1990	Full House	Claire Tanner	Episode: "Granny Tanny"
1990	Murder, She Wrote	Helen Owens	Episode: "Shear Madness"
1990	Blind Faith	Tessie McBride	Miniseries
1990	A Mom for Christmas	Philomena	TV movie
1991	Empty Nest	Aunt Retha	Episode: "The Last Temptation of Laverne"
1991	American Playhouse	Mimi Finkelstein	Episode: "The Sunset Gang"
1993	The Boys	Doris Greenblat	6 episodes
1993	The John Larroquette Show	Mrs. Shenker	Episode: "Pilot"
1993–1995	Dream On	Angie Pedalbee	6 episodes
1994	Murder, She Wrote	Mrs. Leah Colfax	Episode: "The Murder Channel"
1994	Step by Step	Aunt Edna	Episode: "I'll Be Home for Christmas"
1994	A Time to Heal	Maddy	TV movie
1995	Walker, Texas Ranger	Elaine Portugal	Episode: "The Big Bingo Bamboozle"
1996–2005	Everybody Loves Raymond	Marie Barone	Main role (210 episodes)
1997	A Thousand Men and a Baby	Sister Philomena	TV movie
1997	Aaahh!!! Real Monsters	Eunice, Doris	Voice, episode: "Watch the Watch/She Likes Me?"
1999	The King of Queens	Marie Barone	Episode: "Rayny Day"
2000	The Wild Thornberrys	Cow #1	Voice, episode: "Critical Masai"
2000	One True Love	Lillian	TV movie
2001	The Sons of Mistletoe	Margie	TV movie
2002	Touched by an Angel	Rose	Episode: "The Bells of St. Peters"
2003	Lizzie McGuire	Grandma Ruth	Episode: "Grand Ole' Grandma"
2003	A Time to Remember	Maggie Calhoun	TV movie
2004	Raising Waylon	Great Aunt Marie	TV movie
2004	Sesame Street	Herself	Episode: "The Street We Live On"
2006	Our House	Ruth	TV movie
2006	Me, Eloise	(voice)	Episode: "Eloise Goes to School Part 1"
2007	Law & Order: Criminal Intent	Virginia Harrington	Episode: "Privilege"
2009	Mrs. Miracle	Emily Merkle/Mrs. Miracle	TV movie
2010	Mrs. Miracle 2: Miracle In Manhattan	Emily Merkle/Mrs. Miracle	TV movie
2010–2011	The Middle	Mrs. Rinsky	3 episodes
2011	Special Agent Oso	Lena's Grandma	Voice, episode: "A View to the Truth"
2011	Grey's Anatomy	Gladys Polcher	Episode: "It's a Long Way Back"
2011	Hot in Cleveland	Lydia	Episode: "Dancing Queens"
2011	Phineas and Ferb the Movie: Across the 2nd Dimension	Mrs. Thompson	Voice, television film
2012	Desperate Housewives	Doris Hammond	Episode: "Lost My Power"
2013	Major Crimes	Vera Walker	Episode: "There's No Place Like Home"
2013–2014	Melissa & Joey	Sofia	3 episodes
2014	Touched by Romance	Norma	TV movie
2014	The Birthday Boys	Mrs. Steenburg	Episode: "Freshy's"
2015	Merry Kissmas	Mrs. Billing	TV movie
2016	Adam Astra Casting	Dame Daisy Phillips, Lois Willard, Lana delPeno, Carla Lockwood, Cleo Benington	TV movie

== Stage ==
Year	Title	Role	Venue	Dates	Ref.
1955	The Time of Your Life	The Streetwalker's Sidekick	CityCenter	January 19 - January 30	
1955	The Desk Set	Miss Rumple	Broadhurst Theatre	October 24, 1955 - July 7, 1956	
1963	Marathon '33	Rae Wilson	ANTA Playhouse	December 22, 1963 - February 1, 1964	
1966	Malcolm	Standby for: Alice Drummond as Eloisa Brace; Ruth White as Madame Girard	Shubert Theatre	January 11 - January 15	
1966	The Office	Miss Punk	Henry Miller's Theatre	Never officially opened - April 30, 1966	
1966	Under the Weather	Standby for: Shelley Winters as Flora Sharkey / Marcella Vankuchen / Hilda	Cort Theatre	October 27 - November 5	
1967	The Natural Look	Edna	Longacre Theatre	March 11 - March 11	
1969	Last of the Red Hot Lovers	Jeanette Fisher	Eugene O'Neill Theater Center	December 28, 1969 - September 4, 1971	
1972	The Secret Affairs of Mildred Wild	Miss Manley; Standby for: Maureen Stapleton as Mildred Wild	Ambassador Theatre	November 14 - December 2	
1974	Bad Habits	Dolly Scupp	Booth Theatre	May 5 - October 5	
1978	Cheaters	Grace	Biltmore Theatre	January 15 - February 11	

== Awards and nominations ==
Year	Association	Category	Work	Result	Ref.
1983	Primetime Emmy Awards	Outstanding Supporting Actress in a Drama Series	St. Elsewhere	Won	
1985	Primetime Emmy Awards	Outstanding Supporting Actress in a Drama Series	Remington Steele	Nominated	
1989	Primetime Emmy Awards	Outstanding Guest Actress in a Comedy Series	Perfect Strangers	Nominated	
1991	Primetime Emmy Awards	Outstanding Supporting Actress in a Miniseries or Special	American Playhouse	Nominated	
1999	Primetime Emmy Awards	Outstanding Supporting Actress in a Comedy Series	Everybody Loves Raymond	Nominated	
2000	Primetime Emmy Awards	Outstanding Supporting Actress in a Comedy Series	Everybody Loves Raymond	Nominated	
2001	Primetime Emmy Awards	Outstanding Supporting Actress in a Comedy Series	Everybody Loves Raymond	Won	
2001	Online Film & Television Association	Best Supporting Actress in a Comedy Series	Everybody Loves Raymond	Nominated	
2002	American Film Institute	Actor of the Year - Female - TV Series	Everybody Loves Raymond	Nominated	
2002	Primetime Emmy Awards	Outstanding Supporting Actress in a Comedy Series	Everybody Loves Raymond	Won	
2002	Online Film & Television Association	Best Supporting Actress in a Comedy Series	Everybody Loves Raymond	Nominated	
2003	Primetime Emmy Awards	Outstanding Supporting Actress in a Comedy Series	Everybody Loves Raymond	Won	
2004	Screen Actors Guild	Outstanding Performance by a Female Actor in a Comedy Series	Everybody Loves Raymond	Nominated	
2004	Primetime Emmy Awards	Outstanding Supporting Actress in a Comedy Series	Everybody Loves Raymond	Nominated	
2005	Screen Actors Guild	Outstanding Performance by a Female Actor in a Comedy Series	Everybody Loves Raymond	Nominated	
2005	Primetime Emmy Awards	Outstanding Supporting Actress in a Comedy Series	Everybody Loves Raymond	Won	
2015	Hang Onto Your Shorts Film Festival	Best Actress in a Short Film	Zizi and Honeyboy	Nominated	
2015	CineRockom International Film Festival	Lifetime Achievement Award		Won	

== Book ==
- Roberts, Doris (with Danelle Morton) (2003). Are You Hungry, Dear?: Life, Laughs, and Lasagna. New York: St. Martin's Press. ISBN 978-0312312268.
