= Asia Game Changer Awards =

North American award ceremony

- Awarded for: Outstanding achievements in policy and business, arts and culture, and education
- Country: United States
- Presented by: Asia Society, Citi
- First award: October 16, 2014; 12 years ago
- Website: asiasociety.org/gamechangers

The Asia Game Changer Awards is an annual award ceremony held in recognition of individuals and organizations within and connected to the Asian community that have made positive contributions to the development and improvement of Asia and society.

Inaugurated in 2014 by New York-based non-profit organization the Asia Society, in partnership with Citibank, the first ceremony was held at the United Nations headquarters in New York City. A total of thirteen honorees were awarded, including Nobel laureate Malala Yousafzai and internet entrepreneur Jack Ma, who was honoured as the first ever Game Changer of the Year. Nominees are selected from individuals and institutions nominated from the Asia Society's global network, which then embarks on a three-month long process of feedback and voting that results in the final awardees. While recipients are usually from varying diverse backgrounds, the 2019 ceremony marked the first time that all awardees for the year were women only.

Due to the COVID-19 pandemic in the United States, the 2020 and 2021 ceremonies were held online.

== Ceremonies ==
Edition	Date	Venue	City	Ref.
1st	October 16, 2014	United Nations	New York, New York	
2nd	October 13, 2015	United Nations	New York, New York	
3rd	October 27, 2016	United Nations	New York, New York	
4th	November 1, 2017	The Great Hall	Lower Manhattan, New York	
5th	October 9, 2018	The Great Hall	Lower Manhattan, New York	
6th	October 24, 2019	The Great Hall	Lower Manhattan, New York	
7th	October 22, 2020	Online broadcast		
8th	October 28, 2021	Online broadcast		
9th	October 27, 2022	The Great Hall	Lower Manhattan, New York	
10th	October 26, 2023	The Great Hall	Lower Manhattan, New York	

== Honorees ==
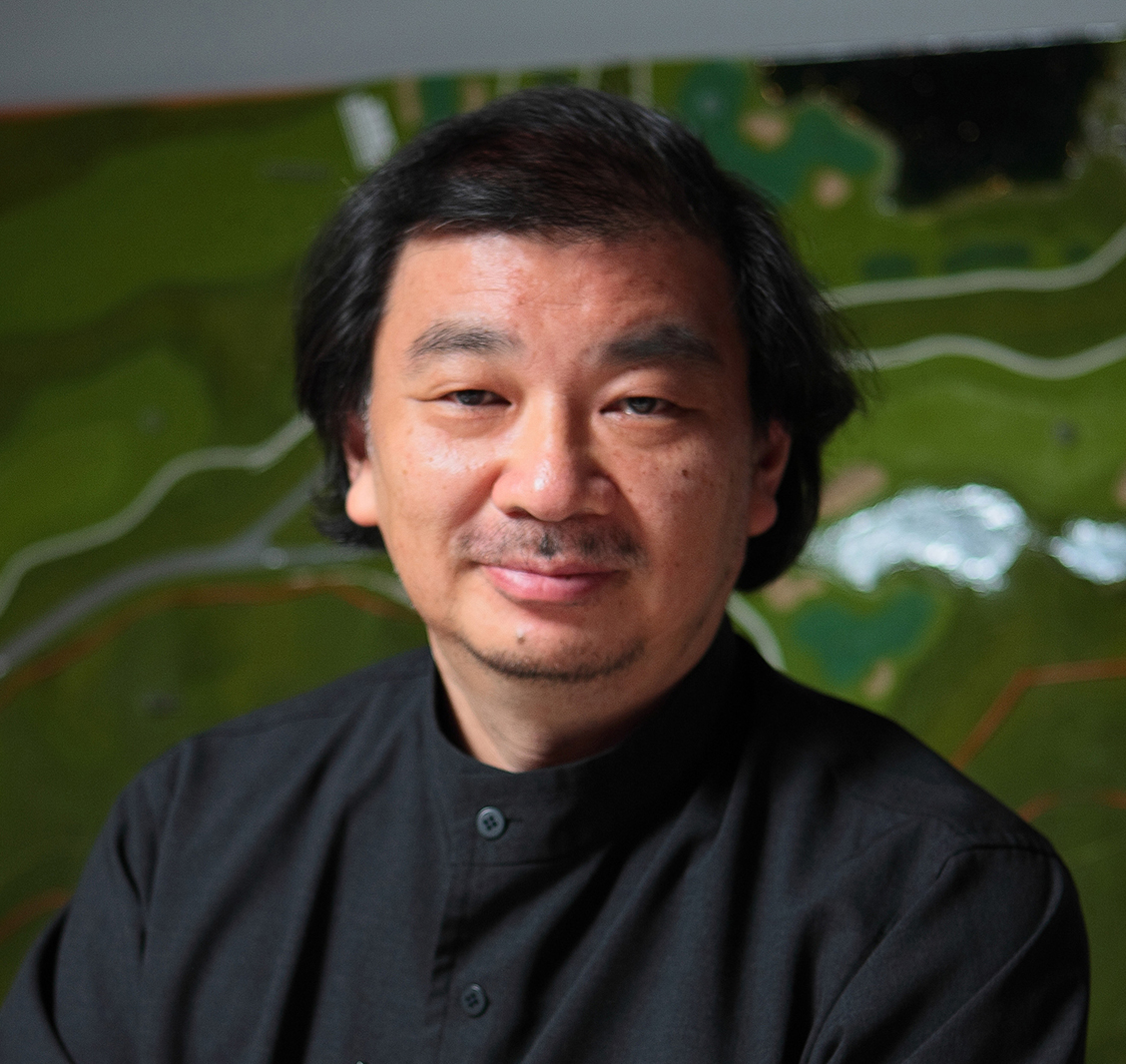
Japanese architect Shigeru Ban was awarded for his work designing disaster relief shelters in Rwanda, Haiti, Japan etc. using recyclable materials.

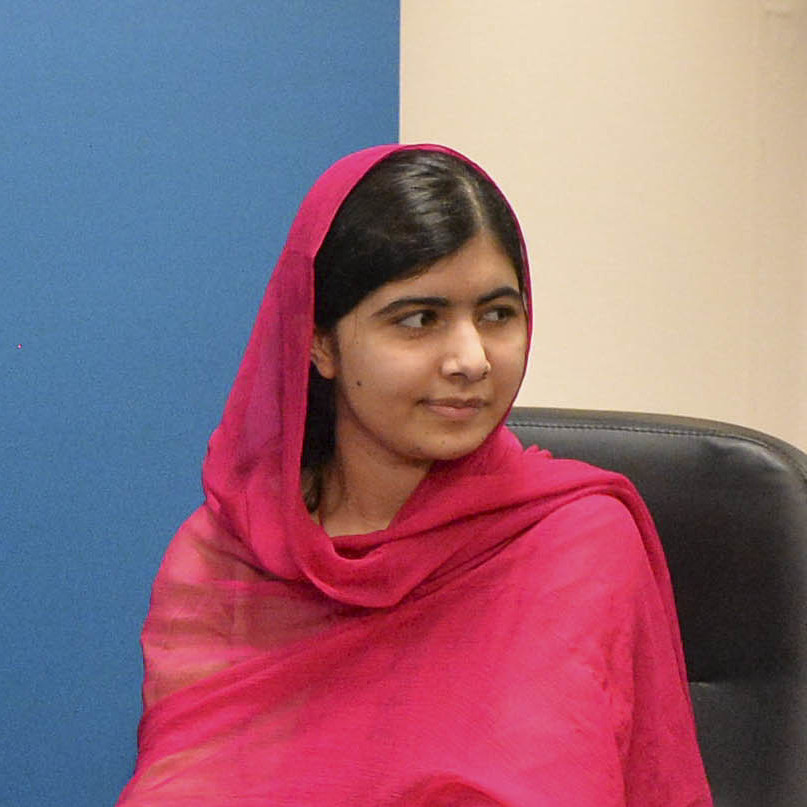
Pakistani activist Malala Yousafzai was awarded for her worldwide advocacy work for girls education.

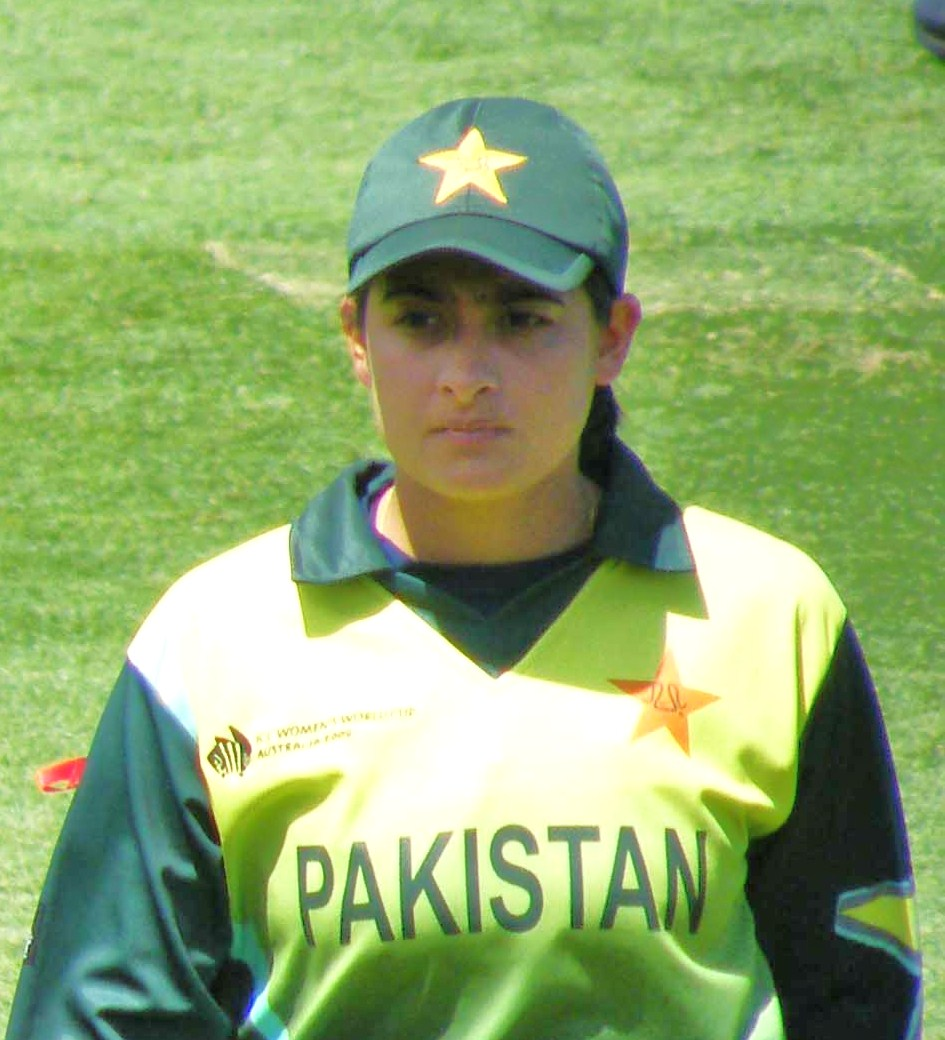
Pakistani cricketer Sana Mir was awarded in 2019 for her success in the traditionally male-dominated sport and for advocating for women's rights, both inside and outside of sports.

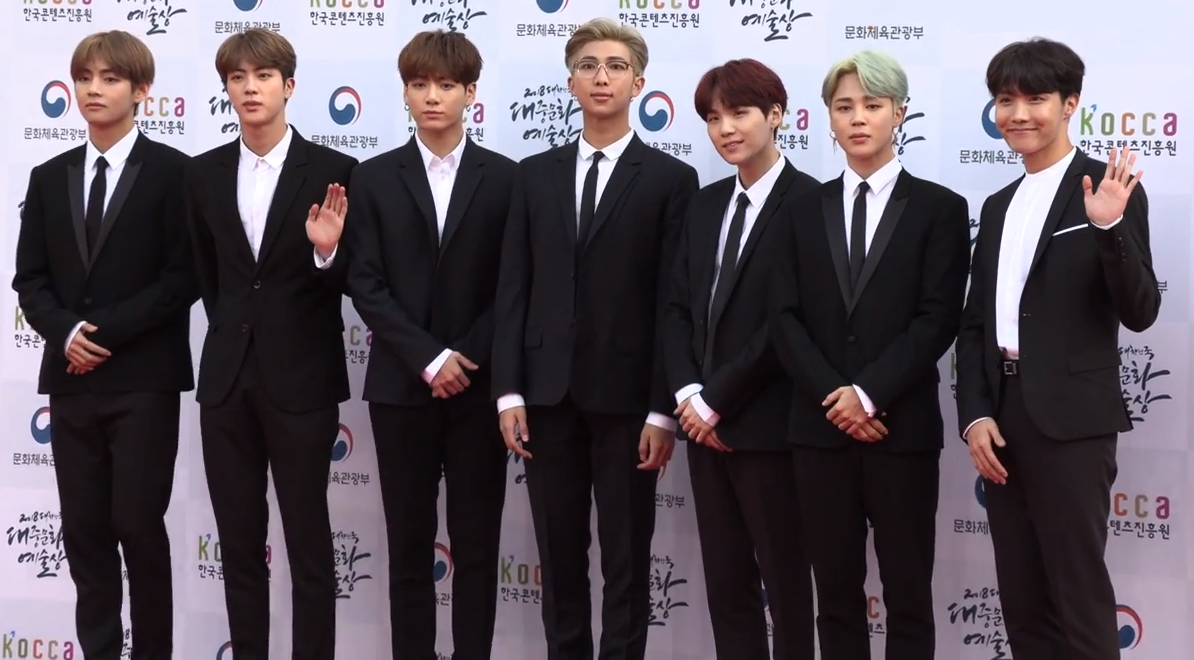
South Korean music group BTS was awarded at the 2020 ceremony for standing against discrimination and inspiring their global fanbase to do the same.

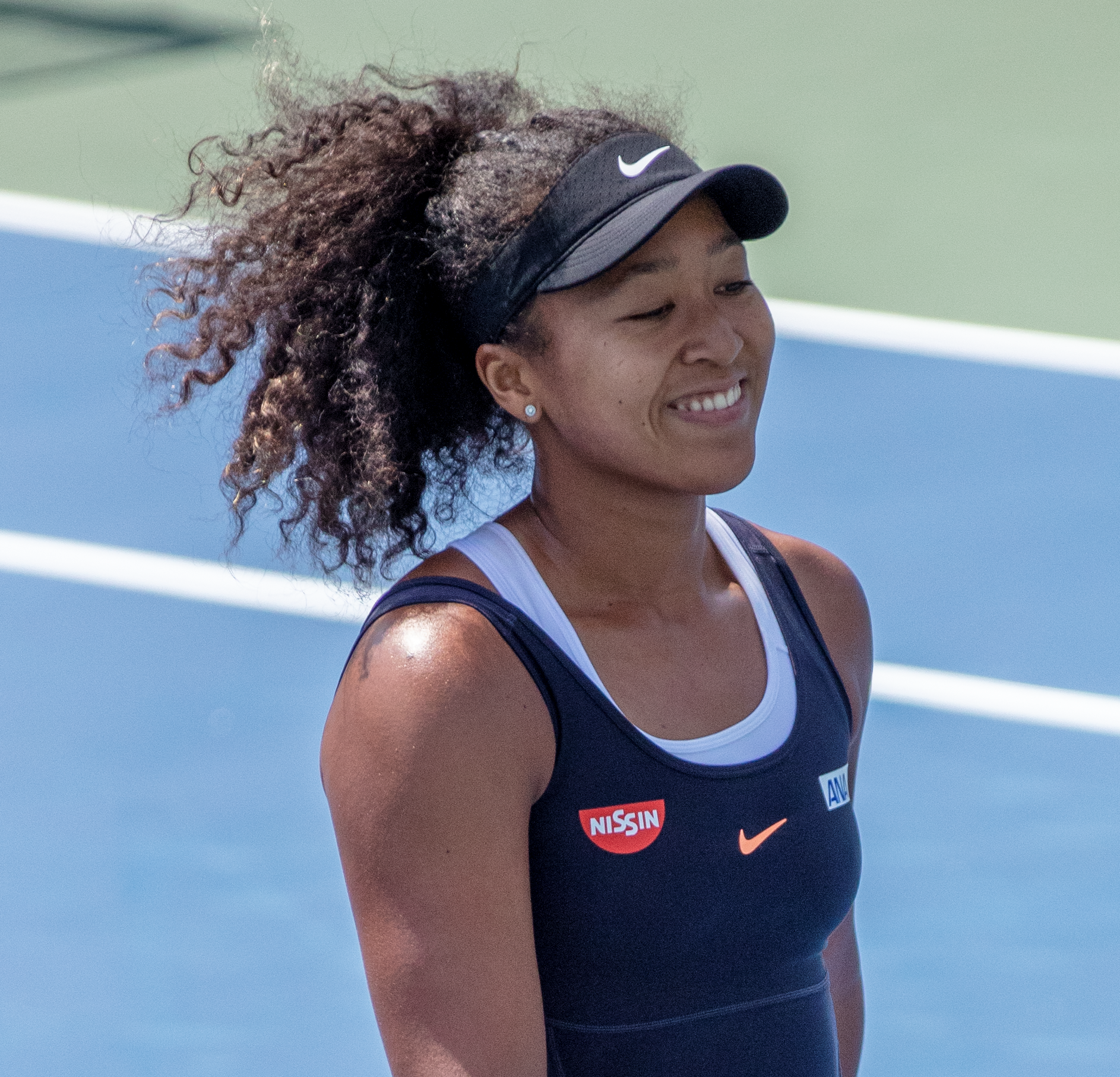
Japanese tennis player Naomi Osaka was also honored at the 2020 ceremony for using her global platform to bring attention to racial injustice and supporting social change.

Year	Recipient	Occupation	Nationality	Ref.
2014	Shigeru Ban	Architect	Japan	
2014	Madhav Chavan	Social activist and entrepreneur philanthropist	India	
2014	Illac Diaz	Social entrepreneur	Philippines	
2014	Fashion Girls for Humanity	Non-profit charity organization	United States	
2014	Kuntoro Mangkusubroto	Head government minister	Indonesia	
2014	Saad Mohseni	Entrepreneur; CEO	Afghanistan	
2014	Jacqueline Novogratz	Businesswoman; CEO	United States	
2014	Sharmeen Obaid-Chinoy	Journalist filmmaker activist	Pakistan	
2014	Playing for Change	Non-profit global music project	United States	
2014	Pawan Sinha	Scientist professor	United States	
2014	Malala Yousafzai	Activist	Pakistan	
2015	Isamu Akasaki, Hiroshi Amano, and Shuji Nakamura	Physicist engineer inventor	Japan	
2015	Li Cunxin	Artistic director philanthropist	China	
2015	Lei Jun	Entrepreneur; CEO philanthropist	China	
2015	Chanda Kochhar	ICICI managing director and CEO	India	
2015	Aasif Mandvi	Actor comedian writer	India	
2015	Mariam al-Mansouri	UAEAF Fighter Pilot	United Arab Emirates	
2015	Kiran Bir Sethi	Designer educator	India	
2016	Joey Alexander	Pianist	Indonesia	
2016	Muzoon Almellehan	Activist	Syria	
2016	Marita Cheng	Entrepreneur; CEO	Australia	
2016	Soo-man Lee	Record producer and executive	South Korea	
2016	Dr. Sanduk Ruit	Ophthalmologist eye surgeon	Nepal	
2016	Ahmad Sarmast	Ethnomusicologist director	Afghanistan	
2016	Durreen Shahnaz	Entrepreneur professor speaker	Bangladesh	
2016	Karim Wasfi	Conductor cellist	Iraq	
2016	Zhang Yimou	Film director and producer	China	
2017	Sonita Alizadeh	Rapper activist	Afghanistan	
2017	Jean Liu	Business executive	China	
2017	Aisholpan Nurgaiv	Eagle hunter	Mongolia	
2017	Leng Ouch	Environmental activist	Cambodia	
2017	Dev Patel	Actor philanthropist	United Kingdom	
2017	Sesame Workshop	Non-profit organization	United States	
2017	Wu Tong	Businessman; CEO	China	
2017	Tadashi Yanai	Businessman; CEO	Japan	
2018	The Afghan Girls Robotics Team	Students	Afghanistan	
2018	Dr. Munjed Al Muderis	Doctor orthopedic surgeon human rights activist and humanitarian professor and lecturer	Iraq	
2018	The Founders of Koolulam	Social musical initiative	Israel	
2018	The Heroes of Fukushima	Plant workers first responders volunteers	Japan	
2018	Mira Rai	Sportswoman	Nepal	
2018	Raed Saleh and the Syrian White Helmets	Volunteer and civil defence organization	Syria	
2018	The Rescue Team at the Tham Luang Caves		Thailand	
2018	Wang Shi	Entrepreneur environmentalist	China	
2019	Hoor Al Qasimi	SAF director curator artist	United Arab Emirates	
2019	Yuriko Koike	Governor of Tokyo	Japan	
2019	Kung Fu Nuns	Social activist humanitarian	Nepal	
2019	Sana Mir	Sportswoman	Pakistan	
2019	Faiza Saeed	Attorney	United States	
2019	Chhaya Sharma	NHRC Deputy Inspector General former Delhi Police Deputy Commissioner of Police	India	
2019	Jane Jie Sun	Businesswoman; CEO	China	
2020	BTS	Musician philanthropist	South Korea	
2020	Vikas Khanna	Chef humanitarian	India	
2020	Miky Lee	Film producer businesswoman	South Korea	
2020	Yo-Yo Ma	Cellist humanitarian	France; United States	
2020	Naomi Osaka	Sportswoman	Japan	
2020	Joseph Tsai and Clara Tsai	Businessman philanthropist	Taiwan	
2021	Rabbi Angela Warnick Buchdahl	Rabbi	United States	
2021	Dr. Morris Chang	Businessman	Taiwan / United States	
2021	Dr. David Ho	Doctor scientist medical researcher	Taiwan / United States	
2021	Sal Khan	Educator	United States	
2021	Sunisa Lee	Gymnast	United States	
2021	Kim Ng	Baseball executive and general manager	United States	
2021	Sundar Pichai	CEO	India / United States	
2022	Michael Bloomberg	Entrepreneur philanthropist former Mayor of New York City	United States	
2022	Arunabha Ghosh	Founder-CEO of Council On Energy, Environment and Water (CEEW)	India	
2022	Kathy Jetñil-Kijiner	Poet climate change activist	Marshall Islands	
2022	Kristin Kagetsu	Co-founder-CEO of Saathi social entrepreneur	India	
2022	Navina Khanna	Co-founder of the HEAL Food Alliance	United States	
2022	Ma Jun	Environmentalist	China	
2022	Nanette Medved-Po	Philanthropist businesswoman	Philippines	
2022	Dr. Rajiv J. Shah	President of the Rockefeller Foundation	United States	
2022	Alok Sharma	Politician; President for COP26	United Kingdom	
2022	Janet Yang	Film producer President of the Academy of Motion Picture Arts and Sciences	United States	
2023	Shabana Basij-Rasikh	Educator co-founder of the School of Leadership Afghanistan (SOLA)	Afghanistan	
2023	Yayoi Kusama	Contemporary artist	Japan	
2023	Josie Natori	Fashion designer entrepreneur pianist	Philippines / United States	
2023	The Philadelphia Orchestra	Diplomacy (U.S.-China relations)	United States	
2023	Yao Chen	Actress producer philanthropist	China	
2023	Dr. Stephen Riady	Philanthropist businessman	Singapore	
2023	Jerry Yang and Akiko Yamazaki	Co-founder and former CEO of Yahoo! Inc. Philanthropist patron of the arts	United States; Costa Rica / Japan	

== Special awards ==
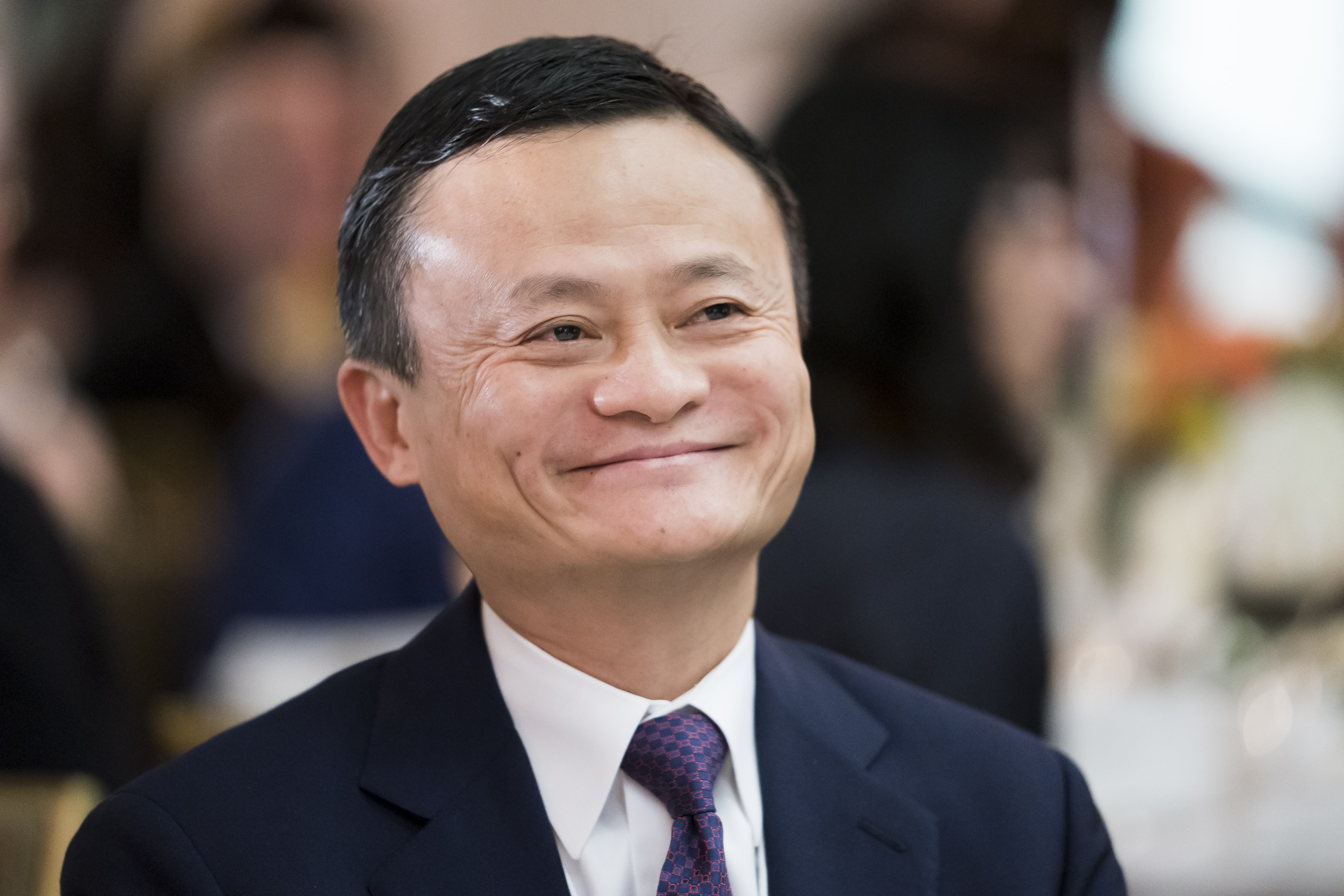
Chinese entrepreneur, and co-founder of Alibaba, Jack Ma, is the first ever Asia Game Changer of the Year award recipient.

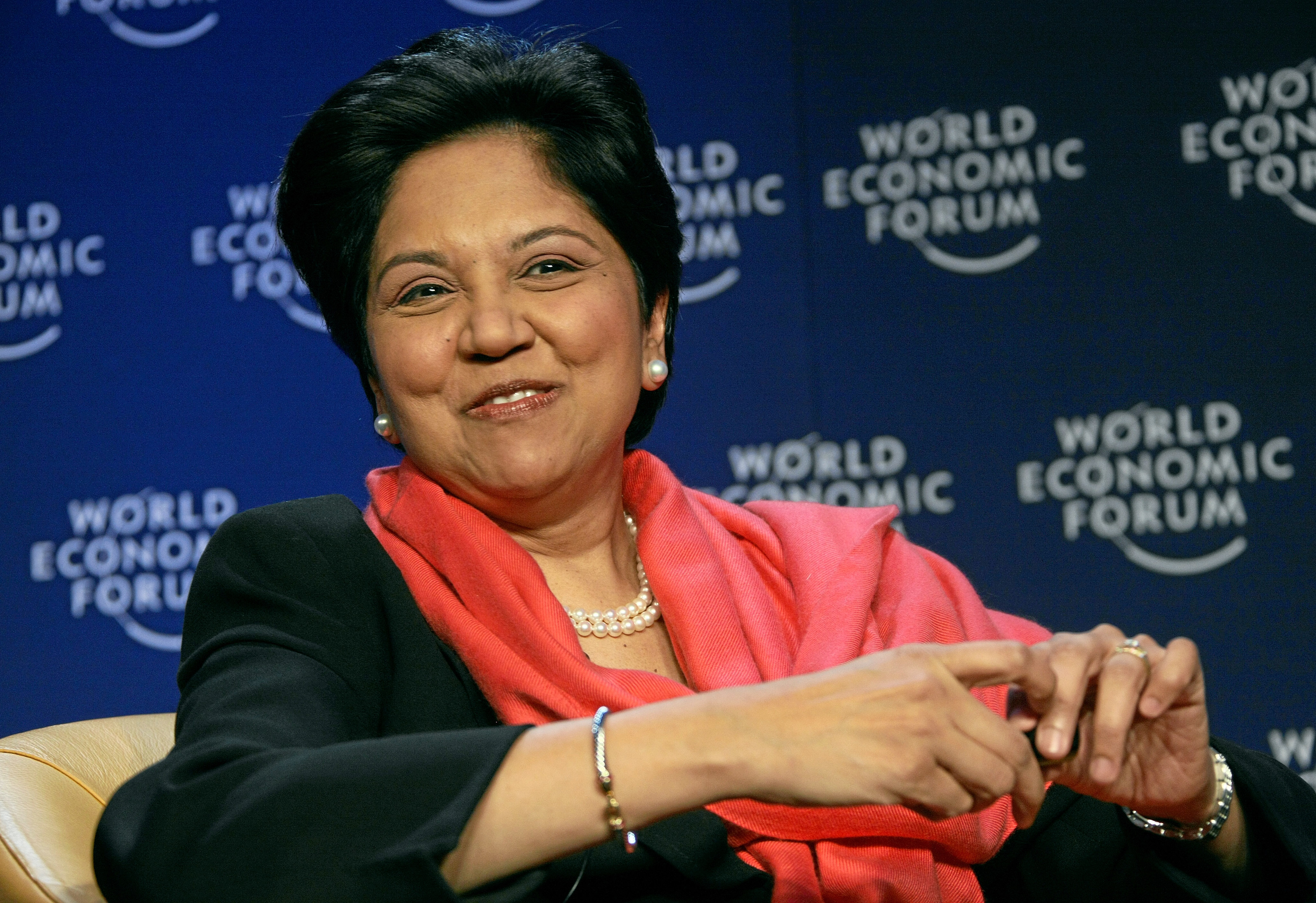
Indra Nooyi, Ceo of PepsiCo, is the first woman to be awarded the Asia Game Changer of the Year.

Year	Award	Recipient	Occupation(s)	Nationality	Ref.
2014	Asia Game Changer of the Year	Jack Ma	Businessman philanthropist	China	
2015	Asia Game Changer of the Year	Manny Pacquiao	Senator	Philippines	
2018	Asia Game Changer of the Year	Indra Nooyi	CEO	India	
2016	Lifetime Achievement Award	I. M. Pei	Architect	China	
2017	Lifetime Achievement Award	The Aga Khan	Imam philanthropist businessman	Switzerland	
