= Calendar Girl (2020 film) =

- Film poster
- Directed by: Christian D. Bruun
- Written by: Natalie Nudell; Christian D. Bruun
- Produced by: Christian D. Bruun; Natalie Nudell; Kate DelPizzo; Reika Alexander; Kikka Hanazawa; Raphael Avigdor; Tracy Jenkins; Teresa Lai; Angela Sun; Mark Romeo; Mary Hackley
- Cinematography: Christian D. Bruun
- Edited by: Rosie Nakamura
- Music by: Deron Johnson
- Release date: November 2020 (DOC NYC)
- Country: United States
- Language: English

Calendar Girl is an American documentary film about Ruth Finley (1920–2018), founder and editor of the Fashion Calendar. It was directed and produced by Christian D. Bruun and produced and written by Natalie Nudell. The film premiered at the 2020 DOC NYC via virtual screenings.

== Production ==
Calendar Girl was made over five years, filming exclusively in New York. Production began after director Christian D. Bruun was approached by Kate DelPizzo (who later became a producer of the film), a family friend of Ruth Finley. Ruth's life's work, the Fashion Calendar, was about to be sold to the CFDA, signaling the end of an era in American fashion. Filming commenced during the last months before the closing of the Fashion Calendar office on Manhattan's Upper Eastside and captured the in-house printing of the last mailed-out issue. Over the following two years the director and producer Natalie Nudell followed Ruth in her daily life; both in the fashion world as well as her personal life after retirement.

== Synopsis ==
From the early 1940s, for over 70 years, the influential subscription-only Fashion Calendar with its iconic pink pages and red covers—designed to be easily noticed on someone's cluttered office desk—laid out every fashion show and event in New York City, including New York Fashion Week. Behind it was founder Ruth Finley.

== Featuring ==
Besides Ruth Finley, the film features interviews with industry insiders Peter Arnold, Mark Badgley, Jeffrey Banks, Mickey Boardman, Andrew Bolton, Thom Browne, Bill Cunningham, Stan Herman, Carolina Herrera, Betsey Johnson, Harold Koda, Steven Kolb, Marylou Luther, Fern Malis, Nicole Miller, James Mischka, Ellin Saltzman, Tadashi Shoji, Valerie Steele, and Eric Wilson.

== Reception ==
The film received high marks across most reviews.

- Sheila O'Malley of Rogerebert.com wrote:

"Christian D. Bruun's fascinating documentary ‘Calendar Girl’ follows Finley as she closes up shop in 2014, readying for the calendar transfer."
"'Calendar Girl', an engaging and sneakily profound film."
"...revelatory about the role Ruth Finley played."

- Glenn Kenny of New York Times wrote:

“This affectionate portrait is also well grounded. Finley is remembered as a hard worker among other hard workers. Despite the extremes often associated with the fashion industry, in Finley's narrative, there's very little haughty self-regard or hyperbole on display.”

- Sabina Dana Plasse of Film Threat wrote:

“What makes this a remarkable story and historical documentary is that Finley is an incredibly affable and impressive woman who managed to handle the divas and queens of the fashion industry.”
“More impressive is how the writer-director presents Calendar Girl as a biopic. Bruun not only focuses on Finley's role in the rise of fashion designers and the billion-dollar business it has become but also examines how the fashion industry evolved to its point of decadence and privilege.”
“Bruun chooses angles, people, and places with jazzy mood music to capture the Big Apple as the center of metropolitan life.”
“Bruun gets Finley to share personal details with humor, class, and grace.”
“As we celebrate Finley, we also watch the torch of the Fashion Calendar change hands and move into the digital age. The Council of Fashion Designers of America (CFDA) buys it from her, so we watch Finley pack up a lifetime of work in her iconic New York City office. This is a tear-jerking moment due to the relationship the filmmaker achieves between subject and audience.”

- Loren King of Alliance of Women Film Journalists wrote:

“Christian D. Brunn's Calendar Girl is part of the fashion documentary tradition that includes Diana Vreeland: The Eye Has to Travel, The September Issue and Unzipped, among many others. It's tangentially about fashion; what makes it so compelling and important is its true subject, Ruth Finley. The film is not just a fitting legacy for Finley's life and work; it's a historical chronicle of New York fashion culture as well as the publishing industry.”

== Distribution ==
The film is represented worldwide by Syndicado Film Sales. In November 2020 the film had its North American premiere at DOC NYC. The film premiered on VOD in North America on March 8, 2022.
