= Visible panty line (disambiguation) =

Visible panty line may refer to

- Panty line, an outline of the underwear visible through clothes
- Visible Panty Line (brand)
- Visible Panty Line (book)
