= Calendar Girl =

Calendar Girl(s) may refer to:

== Film and theater ==
- The Calendar Girl, an American film of 1917
- Calendar Girl (1947 film), an American musical comedy film directed by Allan Dwan
- Calendar Girl (1993 film), an American comedy drama film directed by John Whitesell
- Calendar Girls, a 2003 British comedy film directed by Nigel Cole
  - Calendar Girls (play), a 2008 stage play based on the 2003 film
  - Calendar Girls (musical), a 2015 musical based on the 2003 film
- Calendar Girls (2015 film), an Indian Hindi-language drama film directed by Madhur Bhandarkar
- Calendar Girl (2020 film), an American documentary about Ruth Finley

== Music ==
- Calendar Girl (Julie London album), 1956
- Calendar Girl (Sophie Monk album), 2003
- "Calendar Girl" (song), by Neil Sedaka, 1961
- "Calendar Girl", a song by Crispy from The Game, 1998
- "Calendar Girl", a song by Stars from Set Yourself on Fire, 2004
- "Calendar Girl", a song by The Noise Next Door, 2005
- "Calendar Girl", a song by Waka, Fūri, and Sunao from Aikatsu!, 2012

== Other media ==
- Calendar Girl (DC Comics), a supervillain in The New Batman Adventures
- "Calendar Girl" (The Jeffersons), a 1981 TV episode
