= Hanazawa =

Hanazawa (written 華沢, 花澤 or 花沢, meaning "flower, swamp/marsh/dale") is a Japanese surname. Notable people with the surname include:

- Kana Hanazawa (花澤 香菜; born 1989), Japanese voice actress
- Kengo Hanazawa (花沢 健吾; born 1974), Japanese manga artist
- Kikka Hanazawa (born 1970), Japanese investor and fashion industry executive
- Lemon Hanazawa (華沢 レモン; born 1984), Japanese AV actress
