= Kikka Hanazawa =

Japanese business executive and philanthropist

- Born: Tokyo, Japan
- Education: Columbia University (BA); Harvard Business School (MBA)
- Occupations: Business executive, entrepreneur, philanthropist
- Board member of: Columbia University, Mercari
- Awards: Game Changer Awards (2014)

Kikka Hanazawa (Japanese: 花沢 菊香) is a Japanese business executive, entrepreneur, and philanthropist. She is a member of the Board of Trustees of Columbia University and an independent outside director of Mercari, a Japanese publicly traded technology company.

Hanazawa previously held executive positions at Theory, Cygne International, and VPL. She is the co-founder of Fashion Girls for Humanity, a nonprofit organization established in 2011 to support humanitarian and disaster-relief efforts, and co-founder of Yabbey, a digital fashion design and pattern platform.

She was included in Forbes Asia's 2014 list of 48 Heroes of Philanthropy.

== Early life and education ==
Hanazawa was born in Tokyo, Japan, to Ikue Hanazawa, an haute couture business owner, and Kiyoshi Yokoyama, an entrepreneur who later became a Tendai Buddhist monk. Her aunt, Tomiyo Hanazawa, was a fashion designer specializing in modern interpretations of the Japanese kimono.

Ikue and Tomiyo Hanazawa worked with Chiyo Uno, the Japanese novelist and fashion entrepreneur who founded the magazine Style (Sutairu) in 1936.

Hanazawa attended Columbia University School of General Studies, graduating magna cum laude in 2000 with a Bachelor of Arts in art history. She subsequently earned an MBA from Harvard Business School in 2002.

== Business career ==
=== Itochu and Cygne International ===
Hanazawa began her professional career at Itochu Corporation in New York, where she worked in the company's fashion business.

She subsequently served as chief executive officer of Cygne International, leading a management buyout of the international business of Cygne Designs.

=== Theory ===
Hanazawa joined Theory, a contemporary fashion company, where she held a senior strategic management role.

Her responsibilities included corporate strategy, mergers and acquisitions, and business development. She participated in the company's strategic expansion and initial public offering before its acquisition by Fast Retailing.

=== VPL ===
In 2007, Hanazawa became chief executive officer of VPL, a New York-based contemporary womenswear and activewear company.

VPL was selected as one of ten finalists for the 2007 CFDA/Vogue Fashion Fund, a program established by the Council of Fashion Designers of America and Vogue to support emerging American fashion businesses.

Under Hanazawa's leadership, VPL expanded its wholesale and retail operations, developed sustainable fashion initiatives, and became a Certified B Corporation.

In 2012, VPL received the CFDA Lexus Eco Challenge and

=== Yabbey ===
Hanazawa co-founded Yabbey, a digital fashion design and pattern platform, in 2021.

Yabbey developed from initiatives undertaken during the COVID-19 pandemic to make sewing patterns and production instructions accessible to individuals and organizations. The company provides digital patterns and educational resources for independent designers and makers.

=== IROHA ===
In 2021, Hanazawa founded IROHA, an editorial and cultural initiative connecting Japanese professionals and creative leaders working internationally.

The platform publishes interviews with individuals in art, architecture, science, business, design, and other fields.

IROHA also established an award recognizing achievements across disciplines. Recipients have included restaurateur Reika Alexander in 2024 and architect Shohei Shigematsu in 2025.

== Corporate and university governance ==
=== Columbia University ===
In March 2023, Hanazawa was elected to the Board of Trustees of Columbia University, the university's governing body.

Before joining the university's board, she served on the Board of Visitors of Columbia University's School of General Studies.

Hanazawa established scholarships supporting students at Columbia University's School of General Studies. In 2024, she was also named to lead a $20 million alumni fundraising initiative for the school's first dedicated student residence. Both initiatives were discussed in the Spring 2025 edition of The Owl, Columbia GS's alumni magazine.

Her trustee responsibilities have included service on the university's Finance, Audit, and Physical Assets committees.

In 2024, she received the School of General Studies Owl Award.

=== Mercari ===
In September 2024, Hanazawa was appointed an independent outside director of Mercari, a Japanese technology company listed on the Tokyo Stock Exchange.

Mercari operates consumer-to-consumer marketplaces and financial technology businesses in Japan and the United States.

Hanazawa initially served on the company's Nominating and Compensation Committee.

In September 2026, she joined Mercari's Audit Committee, which oversees corporate auditing, internal controls, and related governance functions.

== Philanthropy and social entrepreneurship ==
=== Fashion Girls for Humanity ===
In 2011, following the 2011 Tōhoku earthquake and tsunami, Hanazawa co-founded Fashion Girls for Humanity with Julie Gilhart, Miki Higasa, and Tomoko Ogura.

Originally established as Fashion Girls for Japan, the organization brought together fashion designers, industry executives, and other professionals to raise funds for disaster relief in Japan.

The organization's activities subsequently expanded to international humanitarian initiatives following Hurricane Sandy, Typhoon Haiyan in the Philippines, and the April 2015 Nepal earthquake.

In 2014, Fashion Girls for Humanity received the Asia Society Game Changer Award.

=== COVID-19 pandemic response ===
During the COVID-19 pandemic, Hanazawa helped organize an initiative through Fashion Girls for Humanity to address shortages of personal protective equipment (PPE).

The organization collaborated with fashion designers, manufacturers, and volunteers to develop and distribute protective gowns and make sewing patterns and production instructions available online.

In May 2020, Vogue reported that Fashion Girls for Humanity had partnered with the luxury resale company The RealReal on a designer face-mask sale benefiting its Gowns for Good Made in America initiative. The program supported small businesses and garment factories producing protective equipment for healthcare workers.

Fashion Girls for Humanity's pandemic response was recognized as a finalist in Fast Company's 2021 World Changing Ideas Awards.

=== Support for Ukrainian designers ===
In 2022, Fashion Girls for Humanity participated in initiatives supporting Ukrainian designers following the Russian invasion of Ukraine.

The organization assisted fashion director Venya Brykalin and other industry participants with a cultural and fashion pop-up in Paris featuring Ukrainian designers and creative businesses.

The initiative was described in an October 2022 Vogue interview with Brykalin, which identified Hanazawa among the founders of Fashion Girls for Humanity.

=== Los Angeles wildfire recovery ===
Following the January 2025 Southern California wildfires, Fashion Girls for Humanity organized fundraising initiatives to support communities affected by the Palisades and Eaton fires.

The organization's efforts focused on supporting schools, arts organizations, and community recovery in Pacific Palisades and Altadena.

In October 2025, the Council of Fashion Designers of America reported on the organization's fundraising campaign, which used donated fashion-related products and experiences to raise money for local recovery initiatives.

In January 2026, Vogue Business interviewed Hanazawa about the effects of the fires on Pacific Palisades, displacement of residents, the challenges of rebuilding, and community recovery.

The article reported that Fashion Girls for Humanity had raised approximately $100,000 through a fundraising auction to support grants for schools in Pacific Palisades and Altadena.

Fashion Girls for Humanity also supported the Pali–Altadena Collective, a youth-led cultural preservation initiative documenting buildings, public places, and community memories affected by the fires through architectural miniatures, photography, and oral histories.

=== Other nonprofit and advisory activities ===
Hanazawa has served in nonprofit and advisory positions in the United States and Japan.

Her affiliations have included the Executive Director's Council of the New York Public Library for the Performing Arts, the finance committee of the Council of Fashion Designers of America, and the Japanese Art Committee of Asia Society.

She has also served as an advisor to the New York City Economic Development Corporation's Incubator Fund and the Tokyo Metropolitan Government's APT Women entrepreneurship program.

Hanazawa has supported the Los Angeles County Museum of Art (LACMA), including its 2026–2027 exhibition Textile Alchemy: The Art of Reiko Sudō & NUNO, for which she was publicly acknowledged as a financial supporter.

== Documentary film ==
Hanazawa was an executive producer of Calendar Girl (2020), a documentary directed by Christian D. Bruun about Ruth Finley, founder of New York's Fashion Calendar.

The film examines Finley's role in coordinating the American fashion industry's event calendar and her decision to sell the publication to the Council of Fashion Designers of America in 2014.

Calendar Girl premiered at the 2020 DOC NYC documentary film festival.

== Patents and inventions ==
Hanazawa is a named inventor on six U.S. patents, including four apparel design patents (2018–2019) and two utility patents related to wearable technology and connected clothing (2021 and 2023).

== Awards and recognition ==
- 2007: CFDA/Vogue Fashion Fund finalist, VPL.
- 2011: WGSN Global Fashion Awards finalist.
- 2012: CFDA Lexus Eco Challenge, VPL.
- 2014: Asia Society Game Changer Award, Fashion Girls for Humanity.
- 2014: Forbes Asia, 48 Heroes of Philanthropy.
- 2020: Harvard Business School Women's Association of Greater New York, Rising Star Award finalist.
- 2021: Harvard Alumni Fashion, Luxury and Retail Award.
- 2021: Fast Company World Changing Ideas Awards, North America finalist, Fashion Girls for Humanity.
- 2022: Fast Company World Changing Ideas Awards finalist, Yabbey.
- 2024: Columbia University School of General Studies Owl Award.
