= Project X (1987 film) =

1987 film by Jonathan Kaplan

- Theatrical release poster by John Alvin
- Directed by: Jonathan Kaplan
- Written by: Lawrence Lasker; Stanley Weiser
- Produced by: Walter F. Parkes; Lawrence Lasker
- Starring: Matthew Broderick; Helen Hunt
- Cinematography: Dean Cundey
- Edited by: O. Nicholas Brown; Brent A. Schoenfeld
- Music by: James Horner
- Distributed by: 20th Century Fox
- Release date: April 17, 1987
- Running time: 108 minutes
- Country: United States
- Languages: English; American Sign Language
- Budget: $18 million
- Box office: $21 million

Project X is a 1987 American science fiction comedy drama film produced by Walter F. Parkes and Lawrence Lasker, directed by Jonathan Kaplan, and starring Matthew Broderick and Helen Hunt. The plot revolves around a USAF Airman (Broderick) who is assigned to care for chimpanzees used in a secret Air Force project. He questions the ethics of the situation when he discovers one of them can communicate with sign language and subsequently learns they will not survive the tests. Hunt's character raised the chimpanzee and taught him sign language before her program funding was cut. She was promised he would be sent to a wildlife preserve, but, as Broderick's character finds out, that was a lie.

== Plot ==
University of Wisconsin graduate student Teri MacDonald has trained a chimpanzee named Virgil to use sign language. When her National Science Foundation research grant is not renewed, Virgil is taken to an Air Force base in Lockridge, Florida, to be used in a top-secret research project involving flight simulation, though Teri is told that he's been sent to the Houston Zoo.

Airman Jimmy Garrett is assigned to the same chimpanzee project. Virgil and Jimmy bond, and Jimmy discovers that Virgil has been taught sign language. Jimmy becomes aware that once the chimpanzees reach a certain level in operating the flight simulator, they will be exposed to a lethal pulse of radiation to determine how long a pilot may survive after a nuclear exchange in carrying out a second strike.

After learning of the chimpanzees' fate, he contacts Teri, who comes to the base. Jimmy challenges Dr. Carroll and others about the project's value by noting that the hypothetical pilot, knowing the implications of the second-strike scenario, would know that he is dying and be affected by that knowledge. However, the chimpanzees would not be as aware; thus, the project is flawed. Enraged, Dr. Carroll promises Jimmy that his military career is finished.

Meanwhile, in the vivarium, some of the chimpanzees have unlocked their cages and have stacked crates and boxes to attempt an escape through a skylight. Jimmy, Teri, Dr. Carroll, and the authorities walk in to see the chimpanzees loose. Virgil is at the top of the stack and attempts to break the skylight with a crowbar, but Teri convinces him to come down. Dr. Carroll tries to control the chimpanzees with an electric prod, but Goliath the chimpanzee overpowers him and the authorities, forcing them to flee. Many chimpanzees escape the vivarium and cause havoc throughout the base, while Goliath and chimpanzees Winston and Spike reach the flight chamber. Inside, the three wreck the simulator and short the reactor's wall control panel, causing the radiation reactor to go up. Jimmy gets Winston and Spike out; however, Goliath's refusal to leave traps him in the flight chamber just as the reactor's wall panel short-circuits and generates a radiation blast. A fire extinguisher left by the chimps jams the reactor on its way down, posing a risk of a meltdown. Jimmy and Virgil convince Goliath to yank out the jammed fire extinguisher, but Goliath later dies from radiation exposure.

Jimmy and Teri steal a military plane to help the chimpanzees escape but are stopped by the military police. While the police are holding them, Virgil pilots the plane, and the chimps fly away. They crash in the nearby Everglades and evade a search. Just as the search is being abandoned, Jimmy and Teri see Virgil hiding in the bush with his chimpanzee girlfriend Ginger. Teri signs to Virgil that he and the others are now "free", and the chimpanzees disappear into the Everglades.

== Cast ==
- Matthew Broderick as Jimmy Garrett
- Helen Hunt as Teri MacDonald
- William Sadler as Dr. Lynard Carroll
- Johnny Ray McGhee as Isaac Robertson
- Jonathan Stark as Sgt. Krieger
- Robin Gammell as Col. Niles
- Stephen Lang as Watts
- Jean Smart as Dr. Criswell
- Daniel Roebuck as Hadfield
- Marvin J. McIntyre as Cellmate
- Harry Northup as Congressman
- Michael Eric Kramer as Lt. Voeks
- Shelly Desai as Mr. Verrous
- Dick Miller as Max King
- Jules Sylvester as Airman
- Richard Cummings Jr. as Lt. Hayes
- Robert Lee Minor as Air Policeman
- Ken Lerner as Finley
- Michael McGrady as Wilson
- Deborah Offner as Carol Lee
- Lance E. Nichols as Hamer
- Ken Sagoes as Patrolman
- Richard Paul as Lead Ape

== Production ==
Lawrence Lasker began pre-production of the film at Warner Bros. Pictures with John Badham directing, but switched to 20th Century Fox after Warner Bros insisted on using small actors in chimpanzee suits instead of real chimpanzees. The film was shot in Los Angeles and at Camarillo Airport and at Van Nuys Airport.

== Reception ==
=== Critical reception ===
The movie received generally positive reviews from critics. On the review aggregator website Rotten Tomatoes, 74% of 19 critics' reviews are positive. Metacritic, which uses a weighted average, assigned the film a score of 61 out of 100, based on 15 critics, indicating "generally favorable" reviews.

In his review for The New York Times, Walter Goodman described the film as a "young folks' story, a sweet-natured boy-and-his-chimp tale (even the bad guys aren't all that bad – that's very arguable), with a dose of Animal Liberation to give the impression that something of current significance is going on."

On 5 February 1989, it was the first film ever shown on Sky Movies in the United Kingdom and Ireland.

=== Controversy ===
TV personality Bob Barker and the United Activists for Animal Rights accused the film's producers of animal cruelty. The American Humane Association, which consulted during production, filed a $10 million defamation lawsuit, arguing that the animal cruelty claims were based on hearsay. In 1994, over Barker's objections, his insurance company settled the lawsuit for $300,000.
