= Our House (2006 film) =

U.S. television movie

- Written by: Michael Lach
- Directed by: Mark Griffiths
- Starring: Doris Roberts; Judy Reyes
- Theme music composer: Kevin Kiner
- Country of origin: United States
- Original language: English

Production
- Running time: 120 minutes

Original release
- Release: May 2006

Our House is a 2006 television movie made for Hallmark Channel that premiered in May 2006. It stars Doris Roberts as a lonely socialite who takes a group of homeless people into her home. Judy Reyes also stars as a homeless woman. The television film was directed by Mark Griffiths.

== Plot ==
After the recent death of her husband and extreme loneliness because her son and especially her daughter have little time to visit her, Ruth (Doris Roberts), an elderly socialite takes an overdose of pills in a suicide attempt. She is saved by Billy (Judy Reyes), a homeless woman. Although Billy is initially resistant to Ruth's attempts to befriend her, she eventually relents and accepts a place to stay in the lonely old socialite's mansion.

To the dismay of Ruth's family and neighbors, several other homeless people also move in with them. Ruth works with them to better their lives and helps them find jobs and purpose in life. Eventually, her daughter finds out and tries to throw the people out because she thinks they're taking advantage of her mother. Ruth's son sees how happy his mother is, so he decides to return to the house to help her.

However, the neighbors are upset and think their property values will go down because of Ruth's new occupants. They sue her and tell lies under oath in court to get the formerly homeless people thrown out. For example, they say that one of the men was urinating in their garden at 3 a.m., yet this never happened. Although Ruth hires a good lawyer (who regularly volunteers to provide free legal advice to the homeless), she soon risks losing her case, because of Beverly Hills covenant rules; the home is regarded as a boarding house which is illegal in their residential neighborhood.

In the meantime, Ruth's lawyer and Billy begin a romantic relationship, but this is stalled when Billy finds out that Ruth is going to lose her case. Billy and the others leave in the middle of the night because they love Ruth and don't want her to lose her home. Ruth finds them, however, and convinces them to come back, saying she needs them as much as they need her.

As Ruth is testifying in court, she faints. Her doctor tells her that her cancer is terminally active. Her daughter realizes the error of her ways, decides to help her mother, so she works together with the lawyer Ruth had hired and creates a deal that the prosecution cannot refuse.

If the prosecuting lawyer (who happens to be a condominium real estate king) suing them doesn't drop the case and sell Ruth's daughter one of his condominiums to house Ruth's friends, then Ruth will give the house to them and they will each become part owner of the house and live there permanently.

Ruth wins her case and they all move into the newly purchased condominium. Ruth passes on, but not before she sees her new and old families come together to provide the halfway house for the homeless which is now called "Our House".

== Cast ==
- Doris Roberts as Ruth
- Judy Reyes as Billy
- Ellen Geer as Rose
- Jim Cody Williams as Tunes
- Stacy Solodki as Dallas
- E.J. Callahan as Max
- Omar J. Dorsey as Milkbone
- Greg Evigan as Todd Preston

== Impact ==
While filming Our House, both Roberts and Reyes vowed to learn about the real-life plight of America's three-million homeless people, and to use every promotional opportunity surrounding the film to create awareness.

Roberts met with Santa Monica Mayor and homeless advocate Bobby Shriver, Corporation for Supportive Housings President and CEO Carla Javits, and Director/CSH Jonathan Hunter. Both stars have made public pleas on behalf of the homeless in national print and media.
