= Shabana Basij-Rasikh =

Afghan educator

- Born: 1990 (age 35–36); Kabul, Afghanistan
- Education: Middlebury College
- Occupations: Educator; Humanitarian; Founder of SOLA
- Years active: 2009–present
- Known for: Founder of School of Leadership, Afghanistan (SOLA) and Hela, Inc.
- Awards: Glamour Top Ten College Women (2010); National Geographic Emerging Explorer (2014); Asia Society Asia Game Changer Award (2023); Malala Award

Shabana Basij-Rasikh (born 1990 in Kabul, Afghanistan) is an Afghan educator, humanitarian, and women's rights champion. She is the founder of Hela, inc. and School of Leadership, Afghanistan, and has received worldwide recognition for her work.

== Early life ==
Basij-Rasikh was born and raised in Kabul. She grew up under the rule of the Taliban, forcing her to dress as a boy to attend a secret school, since educating women was forbidden. She is the founder of Sola (School of Leadership, Afghanistan) and she has been active for the last 9 years since she was a student at Middlebury college. She recently won the Malala award from the president Ashraf Ghani. Shabana first attended public school after their fall in 2002.

She attended her senior year of high school in,Wisconsin, United States as a part of the Kennedy-Lugar Youth Exchange and Study (YES) Program funded by the United States State Department. After graduation, she attended Middlebury College in Vermont, graduating in 2011.

== HELA ==
In 2009, Basij-Rasikh founded HELA, inc, whose mission is to "Empower Afghan Women through Education." The group held fundraisers throughout the North East United States to build a school in a rural area in eastern Afghanistan.

== School of Leadership, Afghanistan ==
While Basij-Rasikh was still in college, she co-founded the School of Leadership, Afghanistan (SOLA), which is "dedicated to giving young Afghans access to quality education abroad and jobs back home.". After graduation, Basij-Rasikh returned to Kabul, and turned SOLA into the first Afghan boarding school for girls. She served as the Acting Head of School for one year, and currently serves as president. Today, it provides an education to girls ages 11–19 across all ethnic backgrounds, and helps them gain admission and financial aid to universities around the world.

Often the girls that graduate from SOLA become the first women to enter their fields, according to the school's website.

== Exile and relocation to Rwanda ==
In August 2021, following the fall of Kabul and the return of the Taliban to power, Basij-Rasikh fled Afghanistan for Rwanda, which had offered to host SOLA. She was joined by the school's entire student body, about 100 recent graduates, and its faculty, a group of roughly 250 people. Before leaving, she destroyed SOLA's student records to prevent the Taliban from identifying families who had educated their daughters.

Four days after arriving in Rwanda, SOLA resumed classes at a hotel that served as a temporary school. In September 2026, the school opened a permanent campus in Rwanda, with 122 girls enrolled; the campus's exact location is not publicly disclosed for security reasons.

To reach more Afghan girls, Basij-Rasikh and her husband, Mati Amin, developed SOLAx, a free online education platform based on the Afghan school curriculum for grades 6 through 12, delivered via WhatsApp. Launched in 2024, SOLAx had about 41,000 students by September 2026, most of them in Afghanistan and others across 76 additional countries.

== Personal life ==
Basij-Rasikh is married to Mati Amin, an entrepreneur who has founded several educational technology companies.

== Awards and recognition ==
Basij-Rasikh has been featured extensively since she attended college. In 2010, she was named one of Glamour Magazine's Top Ten College Women. In 2012, she gave a TEDx talk titled "Dare to Educate Afghan Girls". In 2014, she was named an "Emerging Explorer" by National Geographic and joined 10x10 as a Global Ambassador. In 2019, Forbes named her to its 30 Under 30 Asia list as a social entrepreneur. She received the Asia Society’s Asia Game Changer Award in 2023 for her extensive work in connecting Asia and the world.

In 2024, Basij-Rasikh was selected by Melinda French Gates's Pivotal Ventures as one of 12 women, each given $20 million to regrant to organisations supporting women and girls; she directed the funds to other Afghan civil society organisations operating in exile.

She holds honorary doctorates from SOAS University of London and Cedar Crest College.
