= Fashion Girls for Humanity =

Fashion Girls for Humanity was founded after the 2011 Tōhoku earthquake and tsunami by Kikka Hanazawa, Julie Gilhart, Tomoko Ogura and Miki Higasa in New York. With the interest in raising funds and bringing awareness to the relief and rebuilding efforts for the affected areas in the northeastern regions of Japan, fundraising events such as designer sales have been organized in New York, Tokyo, and London with support from designers and the fashion community. Thus far, Fashion Girls for Humanity has partnered with Japan Society’s Japan Earthquake Relief Fund, Toyo Ito’s KISYN in Japan, Waves for Water for post Hurricane Sandy rebuilding efforts and water filter distribution in Philippines after Typhoon Haiyan and most recently for Shikshya Foundation Nepal earthquake to benefit the earthquake victims.

Fashion Girls for Humanity became a recipient of the Asia Society's Game Changer Award in 2014 which acknowledged Fashion Girls for Humanity's unique model that mobilizes limited resources, utilizes fashion's speed to market, and consolidate otherwise fragmented humanitarian fundraising efforts.
