= SOLA =

School of Leadership Afghanistan or SOLA is an all-girls boarding school in Kabul, Afghanistan. It was founded by Shabana Basij-Rasikh. It is the first boarding school for girls in Afghanistan.

After the Afghan government fell and the Taliban seized control in 2021, Shabana Basij-Rasikh destroyed the records of her students to avoid the Taliban from getting them.

Shabana Basij-Rasikh stated

“As the founder of the only all-girls boarding school in Afghanistan, I’m burning my students’ records not to erase them, but to protect them and their families. I’m making this statement to mainly reassure the families of our students whose records we burned and our supporters of our safety,”

On 24 August 2021 it was announced that the school had temporarily relocated to Rwanda in the previous week, with 250 students and staff.
