= United Activists for Animal Rights =

Animal rights group

- Formation: 1987
- Type: Non-profit organisation
- Purpose: Animal rights
- Headquarters: California, U.S.
- President: Nancy Burnet

United Activists for Animal Rights is an animal rights group led by its president Nancy Burnet and based in California, United States. It was founded in 1987.

United Activists was supported by television personality Bob Barker, who was in a long-term romantic relationship with Burnet from 1983 until his death. The group exposed what they considered their findings of animal cruelty on the set of Project X and in several other media projects together with Barker.

United Activists for Animal Rights, Burnet and Bob Barker were sued by American Humane Association in 1989 for libel, slander and invasion of privacy. It was finally settled by the insurer.

Barker has also helped fund other animal rights groups, including the Sea Shepherd Conservation Society, whose new vessel Bob Barker carries a helicopter named after United Activists' president Nancy Burnet.
