= Leng Ouch =

Cambodian climate activist

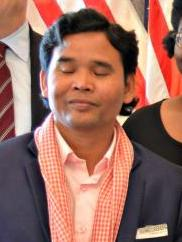
- Born: 1975; Takéo Province, Cambodia
- Occupation: Climate Activist
- Organization: Cambodia Human Rights Task Forces
- Awards: 2016 Goldman Prize Recipient Asia

Leng Ouch is a Cambodian climate activist. He spent his early childhood in the forests in Cambodia and became an activist against illegal logging in Cambodia's forests. He is best known for going undercover to record illegal logging activities in his home country.

== Early life ==
Leng Ouch was born in Takéo Province to a family of poor farmers, and he spent most of his childhood during the Khmer Rouge regime as his family migrated between forests and survived by foraging. He spent the early part of his life hiding in the jungles of Cambodia, only beginning his education after his family moved to Phnom Penh in 1980. He worked for his education and earned a scholarship to attend law school; this allowed him to join many human rights organizations and start his career as an activist.

== Career ==
Leng Ouch founded the Cambodia Human Rights Task Forces (CHRTF), an organization for combating deforestation in Cambodia. During the 2000s and 2010s, Leng has gone undercover in often dangerous situations taking photos and recording evidence of illegal logging, which has led to 23 land concessions being cancelled and a major logging company being exposed. Often adopting disguises in his work, Leng has helped uncover thousands of crimes and confiscate timber and logging equipment. Leng has faced violence in his line of work, with him being arrested with other activists multiple times as well as being beaten by logging company employees.

== Awards ==
-Leng was awarded the Asian Game Changer Awards in 2017 https://asiasociety.org/video/leng-ouch-accepts-asia-society-asia-game-changer-award?page=429

-Leng was awarded the Goldman Environmental Prize in 2016 for his work exposing corruption and illegal logging in Cambodia.
