= The Fashion Calendar =

The Fashion Calendar is an American bi-weekly publication founded by Ruth Finley in 1945, listing all fashion related events in New York City.

The calendar is considered the main resource for scheduling and managing fashion events in New York City. The calendar was acquired by the CFDA on October 1, 2014.

== Early history ==
Before the 1940s, the fashion industry in America was largely disjointed. While there were many events ongoing at any given time, there was no way of learning about these events in one place. The Fashion Calendar was created as an aggregation of these events to not only advertise them and their participants, but also to facilitate scheduling.

Once the calendar began to attract a larger following, subscribing to the Calendar indicated that one was an active participant in the fashion community, and became a key entry into American fashion.

== Acquisition by CFDA ==
By 2014, the fashion calendar had become the go-to listing location for fashion shows and events, particularly in the New York City area. In an effort to increase its efficacy and reach, Ruth Finley handed over ownership of the Calendar to CFDA. This led to the expansion of the Calendar through addition of other locations, the creation of a mobile app, and the expansion of the calendar's scope.
