= VPL (brand) =

American fashion label

VPL (Visible Panty Line) is an American fashion label founded in 2003 in New York based on the idea of underwear as outerwear. VPL is certified as B Corporation in 2016 and benefits various causes including women's education.

The brand is known for its avant-garde and experimental designs that blend fashion and function.

== Meaning ==
VPL is shorthand for "visible panty line" and its products are "meant to be seen." The brand draws inspiration from vintage swimwear and athletic wear from the Olympics.

== Design and production process ==
VPL advocates sustainable production and slow designs. VPL developed unique designs and production process that utilize excess fabric from production to minimize fabric waste ("up cycle" program). VPL is sold in 25 countries, and stores include Barneys, Shopbop, Saks, Net a Porter, Bloomingdale's, Nordstrom, and Harvey Nichols. It also sells directly to customers, and its savings from fabric utilization and vertical distribution are donated to various causes and nonprofit organizations.

Since 2021, digitized VPL designs and patterns have been made available for download on the platform of Yabbey, one of the largest online fashion design, patterns and instruction resources, and VPL products have been produced by over 1,000 makers from over 40 countries. VPL today relies on the decentralized production model for sustainability.

== Movies, TVs, campaign, and celebrities ==
- Tracy Anderson Health
- Shay Mitchell Self
- Priyanka Chopra ABC Quantico
- New York City Ballet campaign
- Victoria Beckham W Magazine
- Gwen Stefani wearing VPL for Sweet Escape campaign
- Madonna on the cover of Vanity Fair
- Rihanna wearing VPL on stage in Athens
- Lady Gaga
- Christy Turlington in Harper's Bazaar
- Tilda Swinton in W Magazine
- Sophia Bush in One Tree Hill
- Jessica Alba in GQ
- Scarlett Johansson cover in Esquire
- Jennifer Lawrence in The Hunger Games
- Blake Lively in Gossip Girl

== Awards ==
- In 2006 VPL received an Ecco Domani Fashion Foundation award.
- In 2007 VPL was one of the top 10 finalists of CFDA / Vogue Fashion Award.
- In 2011 Finalist for WGSN Global Fashion Award for Outstanding New Store
- 2012 Winner of CFDA/Lexus Eco Challenge
- 2012 Finalist for Woolmark Prize

== Brands ==
- VPL Collection (beige label, top-end designer line)
