= Ruth Finley =

American businesswoman (1920–2018)

Ruth Finley (January 14, 1920 – August 25, 2018) was an American businesswoman who was the founder and publisher of The Fashion Calendar.

== Education ==
Finley attended Simmons College in Boston between 1937 and 1941 where she majored in journalism and minored in nutrition. She worked as a theater usher in New York during college and after graduation. At the time, theater in New York followed a centralized schedule of dates and events.

== Honors ==
2016: The Fashion Institute of Technology President's Lifetime Achievement Award

2014: The CFDA Board of Directors Tribute Award

2010: The National Arts Club Medal of Honor.

2008: The High School of Fashion Industries Lifetime Achievement Award
