= List of Panasonic camcorders =

The following is a list of camcorders from Panasonic.

== Consumer standard definition models (VHS) ==
=== Panasonic NV-M1 ===
Introduced in 1985, this was the first one-piece camcorder using full-size VHS cassettes. The camera uses a 1/2-inch colour Newvicon tube with a consumer-grade lens barrel giving a 6 times zoom with macro, normal focussing down to 4 feet (1.2 metres), and a minimum illumination of 10 lux. The microphone and folding viewfinder are physically built-in with no external cables, though headphones and an external microphone can used. The system gives battery and picture quality information to the cameraman using on-screen displays, and a six-digit numeric code can be used to record the date onto the video ("baked in"), though this does not advance automatically. The system can be put into a Standby mode, which shuts down the tape transport and reduces power to the camera and viewfinder tubes, and quickly returned to full operating mode.

The recorder section uses a full-size VHS transport fitted with a two-head VHS-C video head drum, and audio is carried on a mono 8 kHz linear track. Common problems are the brake band around the supply spindle coming off its plastic backing, and distortion of the microswitch which detects when the tape door is closed. Audio output is only produced when the system is in Record, Record-Pause, or Play modes; in other conditions, such as when there is no tape present, there is no audio output.

=== Panasonic NV-M3 ===
Similar to NV-M1, but with ultrasonic autofocus and slightly different case styling.

=== Panasonic NV-M5 ===
Technically similar to NV-M3, but using a CCD instead of a vidicon tube, and in a significantly different case style.

== Professional standard definition models ==
=== Panasonic AG-DP800 "Supercam" ===
Introduced in 1994, the Supercam is a VHS/S-VHS Betacam-style camcorder, including a bayonet-mounted lens, SMPTE timecode functions, 26-pin VTR/CCU connector, genlock and colour bar generator, and is badged as using Digital Signal Processing. Two independent XLR-input audio channels record in Hi-Fi, and on stereo linear tracks with improved 12 kHz bandwidth. The camera is based on a 1/2-inch 3-CCD optical system, and the viewfinder features a generous 1 1/2-inch CRT. A variety of battery mounts are available, including Anton-Bauer and Sony NP-1. Minimum illumination is 0.1 lux, enabled using the "Super" gain setting.

The machine is very convenient to service; many of the PCBs can be hinged down and inspected while operating, and an "Emergency Eject" is provided for by hinging down these boards and manually turning a gear wheel.

=== Panasonic AG-DVX100 (2002) ===
Introduced in 2002, AG-DVX100 was Panasonic's first affordable 3CCD digital progressive scan camcorder recording on MiniDV. Equipped with a 10x Leica Dicomar lens, sensor was a 1/3 inch, 470,000 pixel 3CCD. DVX100 boasts better specs and picture quality than its physically larger predecessors like AG-DVC7 or DVC15. Includes 2 native XLR microphone inputs. Two revisions, namely DVX100A and DVX100B, were introduced in 2004 and 2005, respectively.

=== Panasonic AG-DVC30 (2004) ===
Introduced in 2004, AG-DVC30 was a 3CCD prosumer model, recording on MiniDV. Essentially a step-down version of the renowned DVX100a, it is physically more compact, but uses a smaller (1/4 in.) CCD and lacks the true progressive scan mode. Also, XLR microphone input is not included by default; a 2-channel XLR adapter was offered as additional accessory. Features SNS (Super Night Shooting) mode (Panasonic's version of Nightshot) and optical image stabilization (OIS).

== Professional high definition models ==
=== AG-HVX200, AG-HVX200A (2005, 2006) ===
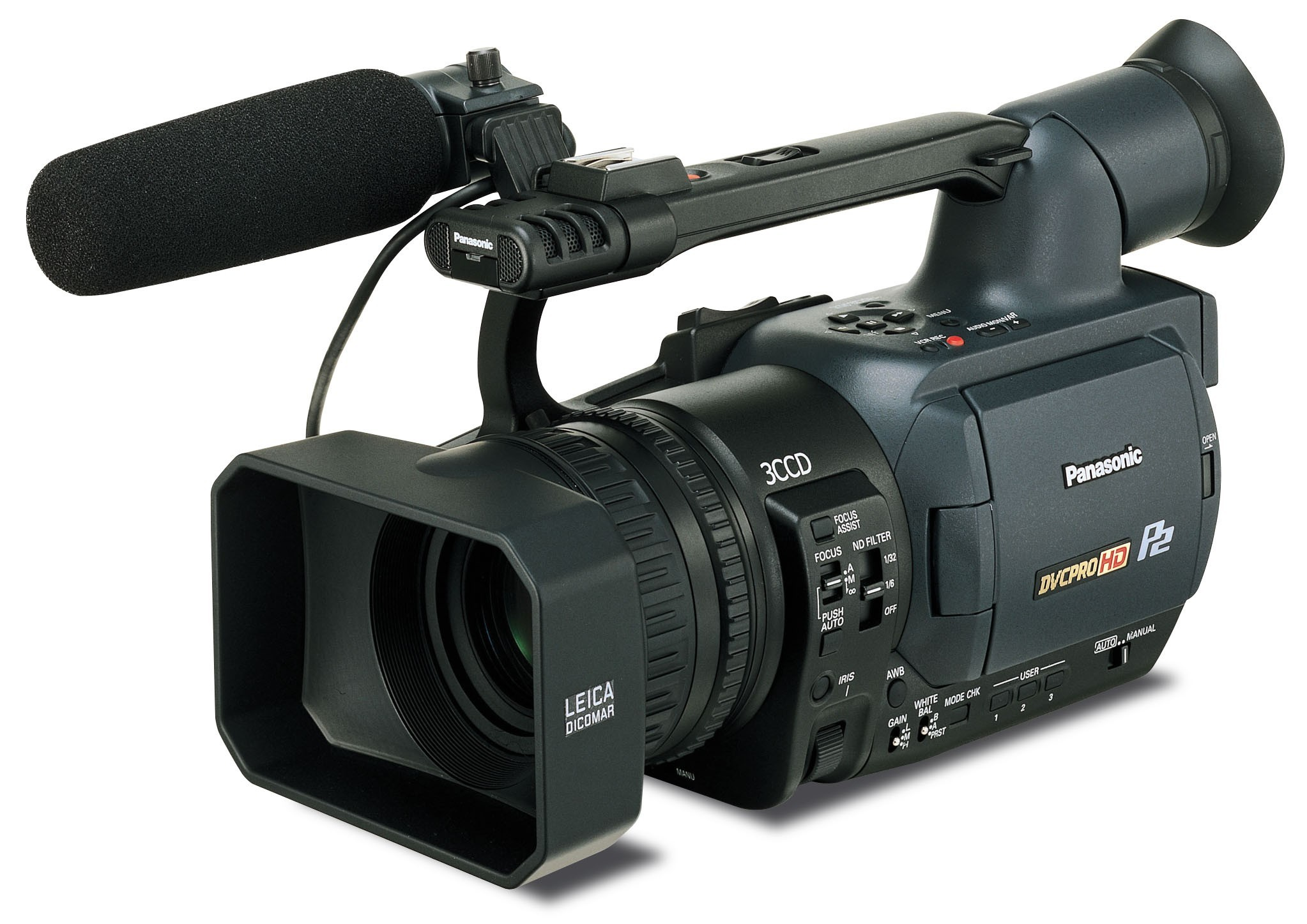
Panasonic AG HVX200

The AG-HVX200 is a fixed-lens hybrid camcorder released in December 2005 for 60 Hz market and April 2006 for 50 Hz market. The camcorder allows file-based recording onto P2 cards, as well recording SD footage onto traditional MiniDV cassettes.

The imaging section employs a 3CCD system with 1/3 inch sensors, each having about 520,000 photosites. High definition resolution is achieved by both horizontal and vertical spatial offset or pixel shifting, though the effective resolution does not exceed 600 lines either horizontally or vertically.

The camcorder is capable of recording in several standard-definition and high-definition video formats. The image is always scanned progressively at 1920×1080 resolution, then is downsized to target frame size.

Recording formats:

- DVCPRO HD: 720p (960×720), 1080i (1280×1080 for 60 Hz regions, 1440×1080 for 50 Hz regions) at 100 Mbit/s
- DVCPRO50: 480i for 60 Hz regions, 576i for 50 Hz regions at 50 Mbit/s
- DVCPRO: 480i for 60 Hz regions, 576i for 50 Hz regions at 25 Mbit/s
- DV: 480i for 60 Hz regions, 576i for 50 Hz regions at 25 Mbit/s

All formats can be recorded onto P2 cards. Only standard DV video can be recorded to MiniDV tapes. In 720p mode the camcorder offers variable shooting rates for overcranking/undercranking.

The updated model, AG-HVX200A, was released in late May 2008. Among other changes, the HVX200A featured improved CCDs and an adjusted lens. These changes improved image quality in addition to providing a wider angle of view.

The camcorder is popular with independent and professional film and television companies. The BBC used the HVX to shoot all their coverage of the 2006 and 2010 Olympics, the Fox network is using P2 exclusively at all network owned-and-operated stations, Raycom has over 85 HVXs at their 21 television stations; NDTV (New Delhi TV), the largest private producer of news and entertainment in India uses several dozen HVXs and New York 1 uses the HVX for all its one-person news crews (over 25 reporters).

==== AG-HPX170 ====
The AG-HPX170 can be thought of as the AG-HVX200A without a tape deck. The camcorder employs the same imaging section as the AG-HVX200A, and is similar to it in terms of physical appearance, layout of controls and functionality.

Compared to the AG-HVX200/200A, the AG-HPX170 is smaller and about 1.6 pound lighter. The lens thread size is reduced from 82mm to 72mm, and field of view is wider. The camera offers more frame rates for overcranking/undercranking. There are more focus assist options, including focus assist bar and focus assist graph. New functionality includes a waveform monitor and vectorscope. Revised neutral density filter offers three settings (1/4, 1/16, and 1/64) instead of two (1/8 and 1/64) for finer control.

The AG-HPX170 also contains an SDI (HD/SD) output terminal enabling the serial transfer of uncompressed video and audio data.

=== AG-HPX500 (2007) ===
The Panasonic AG-HPX500 is a P2 HD camcorder debuted at the NAB 2007 trade show. It is notable for a number of features, including recording on three 2/3" progressive CCD's and utilizing a menu structure similar to the HVX200. The camera is capable of recording at 1080i/p/50/60/25/30/24fps 720p/25/30/60/24fps as well as standard definition progressive and interlaced in PAL and NTSC. Variable frame rates are available for undercranking and overcranking. Sensitivity is rated at f10 at 2000lux. It is related to the Panasonic Varicam.

Panasonic's cine-like gamma curves are included: Cinegama-V for video out and Cinegamma-D for film out.

=== AG-HSC1 (2008) ===
Released in 2008, this camcorder was nothing more than the consumer model HDC-SD1 rebadged and restyled for the professional market. Although it acquired a professional price tag (to reflect the removal of restrictions on the commercial licensing of the AVCHD technology), the blow was softened by the inclusion of a 40 GB portable disc drive. (See HDC-SD1 for more details.)

=== AG-HMC150 (2008) ===
The AG-HMC150 is an AVCCAM camcorder released in 2008. The camcorder employs the same imaging section as the AG-HVX200A and the AG-HPX170, and is very similar to these models in terms of physical appearance and functionality. The major difference is recording media (Secure Digital cards versus P2 cards) and encoding format (AVCHD versus DVCPROHD).

Video is recorded to an SDHC memory card in 720p, 1080i and 1080p formats with data rate up to 24 Mbit/s. A supplied 8 GB SDHC card holds about 45 minutes of video recorded at highest quality setting. The camcorder can record up to 12 hours continuously, provided that a memory card has sufficient storage space.

The camcorder has different model numbers for different markets:

- AG-HMC150/AG-HMC150P is the North American version, which supports only 60 Hz scanning.
- AG-HMC151/AG-HMC151E is the European version which is switchable between 50 Hz and 60 Hz scanning rates, thus providing "world" capability out of the box.
- AG-HMC152/AG-HMC152EN is the Australian version of the camera that supports only 50 Hz scanning.
- AG-HMC153/AG-HMC153MC supports only 50 Hz scanning.
- AG-HMC154/AG-HMC154ER supports only 50 Hz scanning.
- AG-HMC155 is the Asian version, which supports only 60 Hz scanning.

=== AG-HMC40 (2009) ===
Panasonic AG-HMC40 camcorder

The AG-HMC40 is an AVCCAM camcorder released in 2009.

The camcorder shares some components with the HDC-HS300/HDC-TM300/HDC-SD300 consumer series, in particular the 1/4.1-inch 3MOS imaging system, the 12× Leica Dicomar lens and the 2.7-inch touch-sensitive LCD screen. Video is recorded onto a Secure Digital card in 720p, 1080i and 1080p formats with data rate up to 24 Mbit/s.

The AG-HMC40 includes an automatic built-in neutral density (ND) filter. When the iris closes down from fully open position – either manually or automatically – it closes to f/2.8, then the ND filter activates to absorb light while keeping iris at f/2.8. After filter is fully engaged, the iris continues to close. Unlike Canon camcorders, which report constant aperture value when the ND filter is being engaged, the HMC40 reports virtual aperture values. That is, F2.8 means "f/2.8, no ND filter", F3.0 means "f/2.8, 1/6-stop ND", F3.2 means "f/2.8, 1/3-stop ND", etc. With the ND filter fully engaged the camera displays F6.4, which in reality means "f/2.8, 2 and 1/2-stop ND". The operation of the automatic ND filter is fully transparent for a user, does not require use of an external ND filter, and allows achieving shallow depth of field.

Variants:

- AG-HMC40/AG-HMC40P/AG-HMC40U is a North American version, which supports only 60 Hz scanning.
- AG-HMC41/AG-HMC41E is a European version, which supports only 50 Hz scanning.
- AG-HMC45 is an Asian version, which supports only 60 Hz scanning.

The 60 Hz version records in the following formats: 1080/60i, 1080/30p (over 60i), 1080/24p (native), 720/60p, 720/30p (over 60p), 720/24p (Native). The 50 Hz version records in the following formats: 1080/50i, 1080/25p (over 50i), 720/50p, 720/25p (over 50p).

=== AG-HPX300 (2009) ===
The Panasonic AG-HPX300 is a 1/3″ ENG format 3-CMOS P2 HD camcorder

=== AG-HPX370 (2010) ===
The Panasonic AG-HPX370 is a 1/3" ENG format P2 camcorder.

=== AG-AF100 (2010) ===
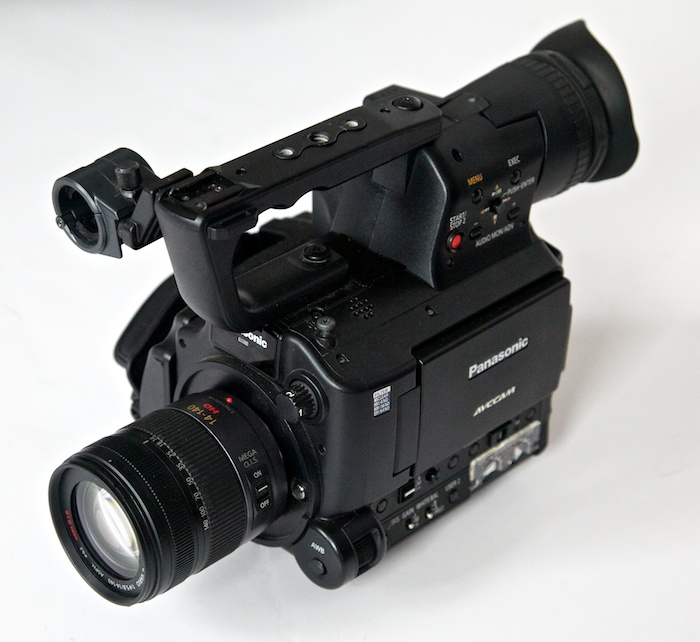
Panasonic AF-100 camcorder

The AG-AF100 was the first professional 4/3" type video camcorder optimized for high-definition video recording.

The AF100 is designed for video and film production, offering the shallow depth of field and wide field of view associated with a large imager. Its Micro Four Thirds mount supports a range of professional lenses, filters, and adapters, providing flexibility in camera setup and equipment choices. The camera supports Full HD 1080 and 720 recording, including native 1080/24p and variable frame rates. It also features professional audio capabilities and is compatible with SDHC and SDXC memory cards.

The design of the AF100’s 4/3" type sensor affords depth of field and field of view similar to that of 35mm movie cameras in a less expensive camera body. Equipped with an interchangeable lens mount, the AF100 can utilize an array of low-cost, widely available still camera lenses as well as film-style lenses with fixed focal lengths and primes.

The AF100 incorporates a 4/3" type, 16:9 MOS imager. The camcorder records 1080/60i, 50i, 30p, 25p and 24p (native) and 720/60p, 50p, 30p, 25p and 24p (native) in AVCHD’s highest-quality PH mode (maximum 24 Mbit/s). Ready for global production standards, the camcorder is 60 Hz and 50 Hz switchable. The AF100 maximizes the potential of its high-resolution imager with built-in ND filtering and dramatically reduced video aliasing. Standard professional interfaces include HD-SDI out, HDMI, time code recording, built-in stereo microphone and USB 2.0. The AF100 features two XLR inputs with +48V Phantom Power capability, 48-kHz/16-bit two-channel digital audio recording and supports LPCM/Dolby-AC3. This newest Panasonic AVCCAM camcorder is the first to enjoy the benefits of advanced SDXC media card compatibility in addition to existing SDHC card support. (SDXC is the newest SD memory card specification that supports memory capacities above 32 GB up to 2 TB). With two SD slots, the AF100 can record up to 12 hours on two 64 GB SDXC cards in PH mode.

=== AG-AC130 (2011) ===
Released Fall 2011.

=== AG-AC160 (2011) ===
Released Fall 2011.

=== AG-HPX600 (2013) ===
2/3" P2 Camcorder with native full HD sensor

=== AJ-PX800 Camera (2014) ===
2/3" ENG style P2 camcorder.

=== AG-DVX200 (2015) ===
The AG-DVX200 was released in the Fall of 2015. It features Leica Dicomar 4K F2.8~F4.5 zoom lens, time-code in/out, 3G HD-SDI and HDMI 2.0 (4K) video outs, easy focus and zooming, and programmable user buttons.

The DVX200 will record 4K (4096 × 2160) / 24p, UHD (3840 × 2160) / HD (1920 × 1080) 60p / 50p / 30p / 25p / 24p in either MP4 / MOV file formats. There are two SD card** slots, facilitating backup and relay recording. For professionals working worldwide, the camera’s master frame rate is selectable between 59.94 Hz (23.98 Hz) / 50.00 Hz / 24.00 Hz.

=== AU-EVA1 (2017) ===
The AU-EVA1 is Panasonic's first compact professional Super 35mm camcorder designed for high-definition video production. The AU-EVA1 was released in the Fall of 2017. The EVA1 combines the cinematic depth of field and expansive field of view typical of larger sensors with the versatility and cost-efficiency of a lightweight, user-friendly body. With its versatile EF lens mount, the EVA1 is compatible with a wide range of cost-effective still camera lenses and high-quality cine lenses, including primes and zooms.

=== HC-X2, HC-X20 (2022) ===
Professional 4K 60p camcorders equipped with 1.0-Type (1.0-inch) sensor and offering 24.5mm wide-angle (35mm equivalent) and optical 20x zoom. They also support 4:2:2 10-bit 4K 30p/25p internal video recording and the new, high-efficiency HEVC codec. They have been equipped with a wide variety of recording formats for the best selection. Super slow motion (120/100 fps) and VFR (2 to 60 fps) allow for a wider range of video expression.

== Consumer high definition models ==
=== HDC-DX1, HDC-SD1 (2007) ===
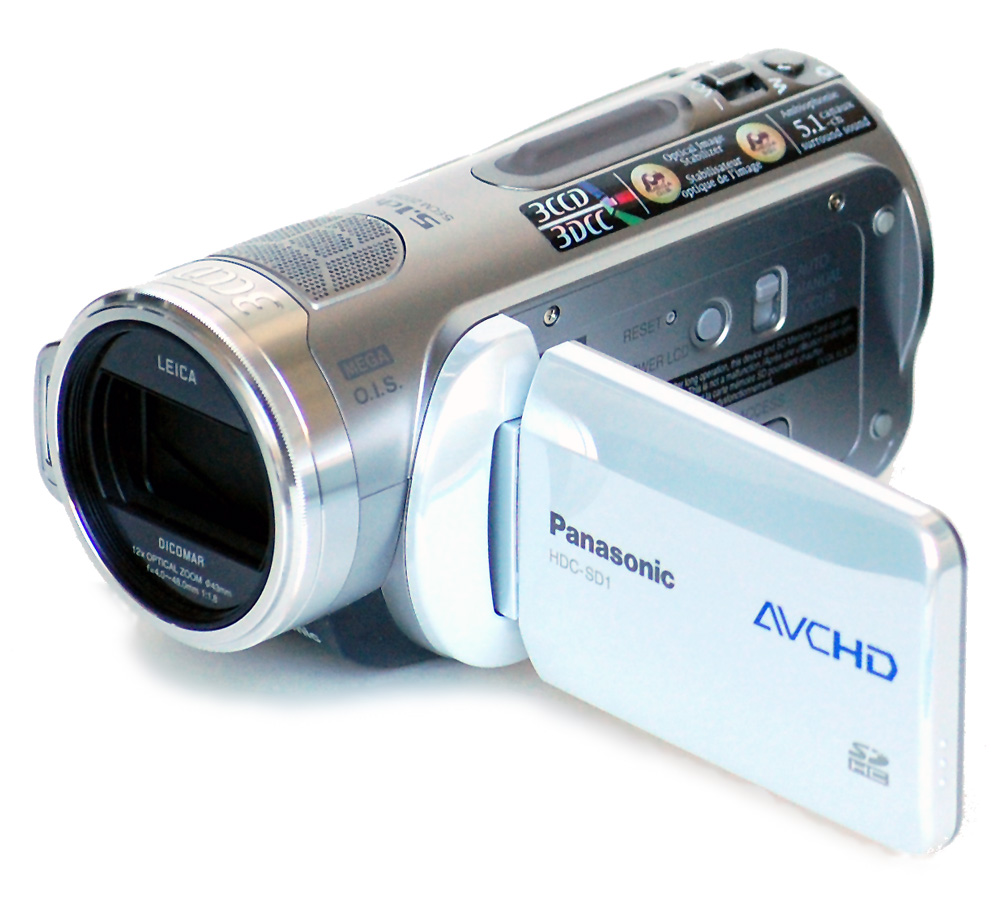
Panasonic HDC-SD1 AVCHD camcorder

The HDC-DX1 and the HDC-SD1 models were the first Panasonic AVCHD camcorders, released in 2007. The HDC-DX1 recorded onto an 8 cm DVD with maximum data rate of 12 Mbit/s, the HDC-SD1 recorded onto an SDHC memory card with maximum data rate of 13 Mbit/s. The HDC-SD1 was the first consumer high definition camcorder to record to solid-state media. Both models featured the ability to record 5.1 channel Dolby Digital sound. An external microphone could be connected but this only worked in 2 channel mode.

Both models recorded interlaced video only with frame size of 1440×1080 pixels and pixel aspect ratio of 1.33, similarly to HDV 1080i camcorders. This apparently came about because the processing chips could not be made at this time which could process the full 1920×1080 video (which was available from the sensors).

The camcorders were equipped with 1/4-inch 3CCD sensor block. Other camcorders either use a single CCD system, or a CMOS system, or a 3CCD setup with smaller sensors. Relatively large sensors with low pixel density provided good light sensitivity, while pixel shifting technology allowed obtaining high resolution.

Prosumer features included threaded lens barrel for attachments, external microphone jack, manual control of aperture, shutter speed and gain, zebra for exposure control and focus assist for manual focusing.

Although both models were sold through consumer outlets, the cameras were described by Panasonic as "Professional broadcast camera system".

Although these models were discontinued when the HDC-SX5 and HDC-SD5 were released, the HDC-SD1 was re-released as the AG-HSC1 aimed squarely at the professional market. Apart from some minor restyling and a change to the colourspace (to match professional requirements), this new offering was otherwise identical to the consumer version. The AG-HSC1 was however, bundled with a portable 40 GB battery operated hard drive, the VW-PT2ZP which was able to import video directly from a SD card.

=== HDC-SX5, HDC-SD5, HDC-SD7 (2007) ===
The HDC-SX5, the HDC-SD5 and the HDC-SD7 represented the second generation of Panasonic AVCHD camcorders. The HDC-SX5 was a hybrid model, which allowed recording onto either an 8-cm DVD or onto a built-in hard disk drive. The HDC-SX5 was the last Panasonic AVCHD camcorder to record onto DVD media. The HDC-SD5 and the HDC-SD7 used Secure Digital memory cards as recording media. The HDC-SD7 was the smallest high definition camcorder at the time of its release.

The HDC-SX5 and SD5 only featured standard stereo sound recording. The HDC-SD7 retained 5.1 channel sound. Neither model permitted the connection of an external microphone.

In the process of miniaturization Panasonic reduced the size of the lens and of the sensor block compared to the first generation of AVCHD camcorders. The lens thread size has been reduced from 43 mm to 37 mm, the sensor size has been reduced from 1/4-inch to 1/6-inch, but the 3CCD setup has been preserved.

Compared to the first generation, full 1920×1080 recording has been added to recording modes, and the maximum data rate has been increased from 13 Mbit/s to 17 Mbit/s.

=== HDC-SD9, HDC-HS9 (2007) ===
The HDC-SD9 and the HDC-HS9 were the updated versions of the HDC-SD5 and the HDC-SX5, respectively. The cameras had the same lens, sensor block, and the input/output connectors as the preceding models. The location of the connectors was revised, and the menu joystick was moved from the back of the camcorder to the left side, inside the LCD cavity. The HDC-SD9 recorded onto Secure Digital memory cards, while the HDC-HS9 recorded onto a built-in hard disk drive. Starting from this series, Panasonic dropped support of DVD media in its AVCHD camcorders. 5.1 sound was recorded, but an external microphone was not an option.

The largest functional difference of the new models is the ability to record progressive video. The 50 Hz version of the camcorder can shoot 25-frame/s progressive video, recording it within an interlaced stream using the progressive segmented frame technique. The 60 Hz version is able to shoot and record native 24-frame/s progressive video. However, both progressive modes can only be used in conjunction with the x.v.color mode and will exhibit too much saturation levels on displays that do not support this color mode.

=== HDC-SD100, HDC-HS100 (2008) ===
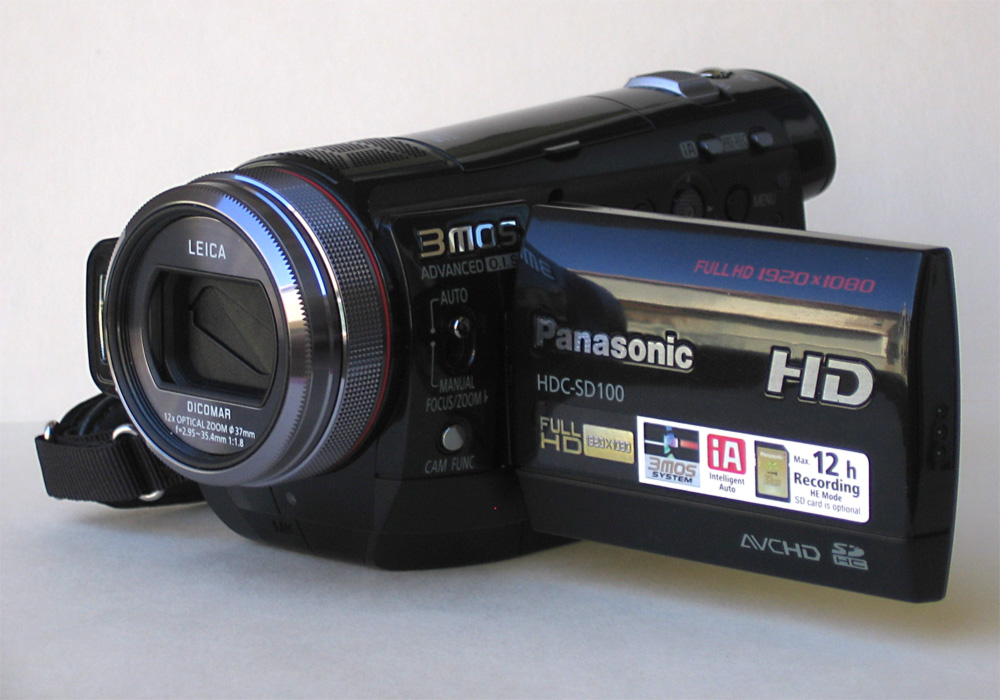
Panasonic HDC-SD100 camcorder

The HDC-SD100 and the HDC-HS100, released in 2008, signified Panasonic's switch from CCD to CMOS technology. Traditionally for Panasonic, these camcorders used a 3-sensor setup, which was called 3MOS. As in the previous generations, the 1/6-inch sensors used pixel-shift technology, having 520,000 effective pixels each.

The HDC-SD100 recorded to a removable SDHC memory card only, while the HDC-HS100 was also capable of recording onto a built-in 60 GB hard disk drive. These camcorders also feature a built-in viewfinder not present in the smaller models above.

The format of the recorded AVCHD video has been slightly revised and some editing packages will not recognize it.

Interlaced video was the main recording format for both camcorders, though there was an option of recording progressive video. The 50 Hz versions were capable of shooting 25-frame/s progressive video, recording it within interlaced stream using progressive segmented frame technique. The 60 Hz versions were able to shoot and record native 24-frame/s progressive video, which was an unusual feature for a consumer camcorder though it is only available with x.v.color.

The camcorders offered the same frame size and quality settings as earlier models. An 8 GB SDHC card (supplied only in some markets) holds up to one hour of video recorded at highest quality setting.

In these models Panasonic brought back features that had been lost from prior AVCHD models, like external microphone jack and accessory shoe. They also introduced a manual focusing ring and a headphone socket.

=== HDC-HS300, HDC-SD300, HDC-TM300 (2009) ===
The HDC-HS300 improve the HDC-SD100/HDC-HS100 in two major aspects. Following complaints about the noise from the smaller sensors in low light, this model uses larger sensors, though not quite as large as the HDC-DX1 and SD1's sensors. They are only slightly smaller at 1/4.1 inch (mixture of fractions and decimal by Panasonic). They have a slightly noticeable worse noise performance compared to the DX1 and SD1 but much better than the 1/6 inch 3CCD sensor camcorders. The sensors are also 3 megapixels each (previously 0.5 megapixels) and consequently using pixel shift technology is not necessary anymore to achieve high definition images. The camera features vastly improved resolution when used to take still pictures (up to 10.6 megapixels). The optical image stabiliser has been improved and now features two modes of operation for video mode and four for still photo mode.

A special Digital Cinema mode allows shooting progressive-scan video at film-like rates—25p or 24p, depending on region. Video shot in progressive mode is recorded in interlaced container by using either progressive segmented frame technique for 25p mode or 2-3 pulldown for 24p mode.

Progressive mode is mentioned in neither the camera specification nor the operating manual.

The HDC-HS300 features a 120 GB hard disc drive for storage. There was also a 240 GB HDD version, the HDC-HS350. The HDC-TM300 is a new departure and features a built-in 32 GB of Flash memory instead of a hard disc drive (The 'TM' in the model number stands for 'Twin Memory' as this model takes FLASH memory cards as well). This model has been slightly restyled compared with its stable mate.

The HDC-SD300 records video to a SD FLASH card only. It had fairly limited distribution as it only existed as a European model (HDC-SD300EG).

The 5 microphones used to pick up the 5.1 surround sound have also been revised, and the new model features better (though nowhere near perfect) directivity of the recorded sound.

Each camcorder also features an accessory shoe. It is built in on the HDC-HS300 but is an attachable accessory on the HDC-TM300.

=== HDC-HS200, HDC-SD200 (2009) ===
These are lower cost versions of the HDC-HS300 and HDC-TM300 respectively. The former has a smaller hard disc drive of 80 Gb, but the viewfinder and accessory shoe have been removed. The latter does not have any built in memory, viewfinder or accessory shoe.

=== HDC-TM350 ===
This is identical to the HDC-TM300 except for a larger 64 GB built in Flash memory and being coloured grey instead of black.

This camera is a limited-edition model. In the UK, only 200 have been sold.

=== HDC-HS700, HDC-TM700, HDC-SD700 (2010) ===
Panasonic's 2010 camcorders add 1080p60 or 1080p50 progressive recording mode (depending on region) by using a proprietary variation of the AVCHD format.

The lens has been revised to provide a shorter focal length, though the optical zoom range remains unchanged. The focal length is now 3.45–41.4 mm instead of the 4–48 mm of the previous model (effectively a magnification of 0.85 times). The lens gains one third of a stop in speed at the wide angle end only as a result. The specification is otherwise identical to the previous model.

Pixel shifting has been reintroduced, but only to provide still pictures with up to 14.2 Megapixels of resolution.

The storage capacity of the hard disc drive in the HC-HS700 has been increased to 240 GB. The inbuilt FLASH memory of the HDC-TM700 remains unchanged at 32 GB. The HDC-SD700 only records to SD, SD-HC or SD-XC FLASH memory cards.

==== HDC-SD600 (2010) ====
A 'lite' version of the HDC-SD700. Apart from the following variations, it is identical to the HDC-SD700.

- No electronic Viewfinder.
- No microphone or earphone connectors.
- Dolby digital 2.0 audio (in lieu of Dolby 5.1).
- A 2.7 inch LCD monitor (in lieu of 3 inch).
- No accessory shoe.
- No manual zoom/focusing ring.

==== HDC-SDT750 (2010) ====
Essentially a HDC-SD700, but supplied with a 3D lens adaptor, the VW-CLT1 and a HDMI cable (mini). This model featured HYBRID OIS image stabilising system combining optical and electrical components, not available in the previous 2010 line-up. The 3D effect is somewhat less than real life because the lenses are much closer together than the interocular distance of the eyes. The camera when fitted with its 3D lens only records in side by side (SbS) format. The resolution of the image is consequently less than a full HD image.

==== HDC-SD66 ====
Released in February 2010, the HDC-SD66 supports 1080p/50i AVCHD video recording, 25× optical zoom and capturing 5 megapixel still photos.

=== HDC-HS900, HDC-TM900, HDC-SD900 (2011) ===
Panasonic's 2011 camcorders succeed the previous year's HDC-xx700 series with very little change. They retain the same 3xCMOS 1/4.1 inch sensor, EVF and lens. The LCD touchscreen is slightly larger with an increase in resolution. Performance is similar, low light sensitivity a bit better. Adds support for an optional 3D lens attachment.

The hard disc drive in the HDC-HS900 is slightly reduced in size from the HDC-HS700 to 220 GB. The inbuilt FLASH memory of the HDC-TM900 is unchanged at 32 GB.

A 3D adaptor is available for this camcorder, the VW-CLT1 though the 3D effect is rather poor because the distance between the lenses is substantially less than the interocular distance of the eyes.

=== HC-V500, HC-V500M (2012) ===
Released in 2012, these models support 1080p video recording at 50 frames per second (stylized as 1080/50p or 1080p/50p) and have 38× optical zoom.

Its 3 megapixel CMOS image sensor enables up to 50 times total zoom, assisted by lossless digital zoom (branded as intelligent zoom / iZoom), or full-resolution (2304×1296 pixel) still images while recording.

Other recording modes are 1080/50i (Interlaced video) with four selectable bit rate levels, and a 540p/25p mode which uses intra-frame coding rather than inter-frame coding.

The HC-V500M variant has additional 16 GB of internal storage.

The OIS Lock feature allows fixing the optical image stabilizer rather than following the camera pan, which helps fixing the camera's canvas on far subjects while zoomed in.

The PRE REC feature allows buffering video footage shortly prior to initiating the video recording. The buffered video footage gets stored upon actuating the recording button. PRE REC is used to help prevent missing out a moment without having to actively record continuously.

The built-in LED lamp can be used to illuminate photos and video recordings. It can manually be toggled, as well as be set to automatically activate where needed.

The resistive touch screen's brightness can optionally automatically adapt to the surrounding brightness measured through the image sensor.

The video player interface allows frame-by-frame navigation of recorded footage and extracting still photographs from video frames using the photo button on the top.

The new Shooting guide feature can display hints during video recording such as warning the user for panning too quickly, and the new Quick Start option keeps the lens cover open for up to five minutes after closing the foldable screen to enable video recording more rapidly when opening it again.

=== HC-X900, HC-X900M (2012) ===
Panasonic's 2012 camcorders succeed the previous year's range, once again with very little change. A hard disc option has been dropped from the range. The focal length of the lens has been reduced (2.84mm to 34.1mm), effectively a magnification of 0.7 on the original lens (as of the 300 series) or approximately 0.85 from the 700 series. The same size of sensors are used, though the pixel shifting has been revised to provide a maximum still resolution of 16 Megapixels.

The LCD panel and the electronic viewfinder have a much larger pixel count. The LCD panel also features a 'glasses free' capability of viewing shot 3D footage made either with the optional 3D adaptor or simulated from 2D footage. The camera is able to output a simulated 3D picture from its HDMI port. The 3D adaptor for these models is the VW-CLT2 - substantially improved and much more expensive than its predecessor, though the 3D effect is still rather less than real life (because the two lenses are closer together than the distance between the eyes). The camera records 3D from the adaptor in either full 3D or SbS mode.

Both models accept SD, SD-HC and SD-XC FLASH memory cards. In addition, the HC-X900M also features 32 GB of built in FLASH memory.

==== HC-X800 ====
A 'lite' version of the HDC-X900 model.

The HC-X800 is similar but is missing the electronic viewfinder; has a smaller LCD panel (3 inches -v- 3.5 inches); is slightly smaller; only records sound in Dolby stereo instead of Dolby Digital 5.1 and lacks an external microphone input and a headphone output. This camera also accepts the VW-CLT2 3D adaptor, though the LCD panel does not support a 3D display mode.

=== HC-X920, HC-X920M (2013) ===
Released in 2013, the HC-X920/HC-X920M improve on the HC-X900 series by adding wifi capability (including support for control by a smartphone) and increasing the sensor size from three 1/4.1" MOS to three 1/2.3" MOS with back side illumination and increased pixel count. The stability controls also gain a gravity sensor. The focal length of the lens remains the same as its predecessor such that the 35mm equivalent range is 29.8 - 399.2 mm.

Once again the M designates a built-in 32 GB of flash storage and the VW-CLT2 is used for recording in 3D.

=== HC-X1000 (2014) ===
The HC-X1000 was released in 2014, with Panasonic claiming it to be the first camcorder capable of recording 4K (2160p) at 60p/50p frame rates onto an SD card. Unlike others in the HC range the HC-X1000 is a larger unit appearing closer in design to the AG-AC90 professional camcorder. Panasonic USA's site refers to the image sensor as being 1/2.3" MOS. The European site claims a total pixel count of 18.91 megapixels versus the USA/Canada's 18.47 megapixels, however both have the same 8.85 megapixels (17:9), 8.29 megapixels (16:9) effective pixel count in both video and still picture modes. Other features include wifi, dual SD card slots, 20x optical zoom, 40x intelligent zoom (in 1920x1080 or lower record modes) and 2/5/10x digital zoom. Focal length is 4.08 ― 81.6 mm, resulting in a 35mm equivalent of 29.5 ― 600 mm (17:9) or 30.8 ― 626 mm (16:9).

=== HC-V550 (2014) ===
The HC-V550 and HC-V500M were unveiled at CES 2014, with a somewhat similar design as the HC-V500, but extended optical and digital zoom and added functionality. It supports 50 times optical zoom; lossless digital zoom is supported up to 150 times. The resolution of the image sensor has increased to 10 megapixels (4224×2376). The HC-V550 adds NFC and WiFi connectivity support.

=== HC-W850, HC-V750 (2014) ===
The HC-W850/HC-V750 models released in 2014 introduce a new lenses, sensor, engine combination. The new four-drive lens system allows a 20x optical zoom level vs 12x optical zoom in HC-X920 which has a similar body size. A single 1/2.3" MOS with back side illumination sensor replaces the 3MOS sensor last seen in HC-X920. They can record video at 120 fps, which then appears in the 60 fps video file as a slow motion sequence, with no sound. The HC-W850 has a sub-camera built into the edge of the display which can be rotated to capture a second angle, superimposing over the main image.

=== HC-WX970, HC-VX870, HC-V770 (2015) ===
The HC-WX970/HC-VX870 models released in 2015 allow recording 4K at 30 fps. The HC-V770 model has the same 1/2.3" MOS with back side illumination sensor, but only allows recording full HD. The video can be recorded using High Dynamic Range (HDR), which combines two images taken with different exposures to reduce over- and underexposure. Videos more than nine minutes long are recorded seamlessly into separate files . HC-WX970 has a sub-camera built into the edge of the display.

=== HC-VXF990, HC-VX980 (2016) ===
The HC-VXF990/HC-VX980 models released in 2016 allow cropping full HD video out of a 4K recording. The difference between the two models is that HC-VXF990 has a tiltable viewfinder.

==== HC-WXF991K ====
The HC-WXF991K is an iteration released later in the same year, equipped with additional Wi-Fi connectivity for allowing remote control through software on a mobile phone, and a 5.1 surround sound microphone. It is able to capture 25.9 Megapixel (6784 x 3816) still photos. after 2160p (4K) video recording, 20.4 Megapixel (6016×3384) still photos can be captured simultaneously.

Optical zooming is supported up to 20 times. With lossless digital zoom, described by Panasonic as "Intelligent Zoom", zoom levels of up to 25 times and 40 times can be achieved at 2160p and 1080p respectively.

HDR video can be captured at up to 1080p (Full HD).

It also is equipped with an additional 5.27 Megapixel rotatable sub camera attached to the tiltable screen.

Its firmware allows extracting 8.3 Megapixel still photos from 2160p video frames, zooming and cropping the video footage, and adding effects such as additional stabilization and dolly zoom.
