= Panasonic Leica DG Vario-Elmarit 8-18 mm =

Digital compact ultra wide angel lens

Panasonic Leica DG Vario-Elmarit 8-18 mm F2.8–4.0 Asph.
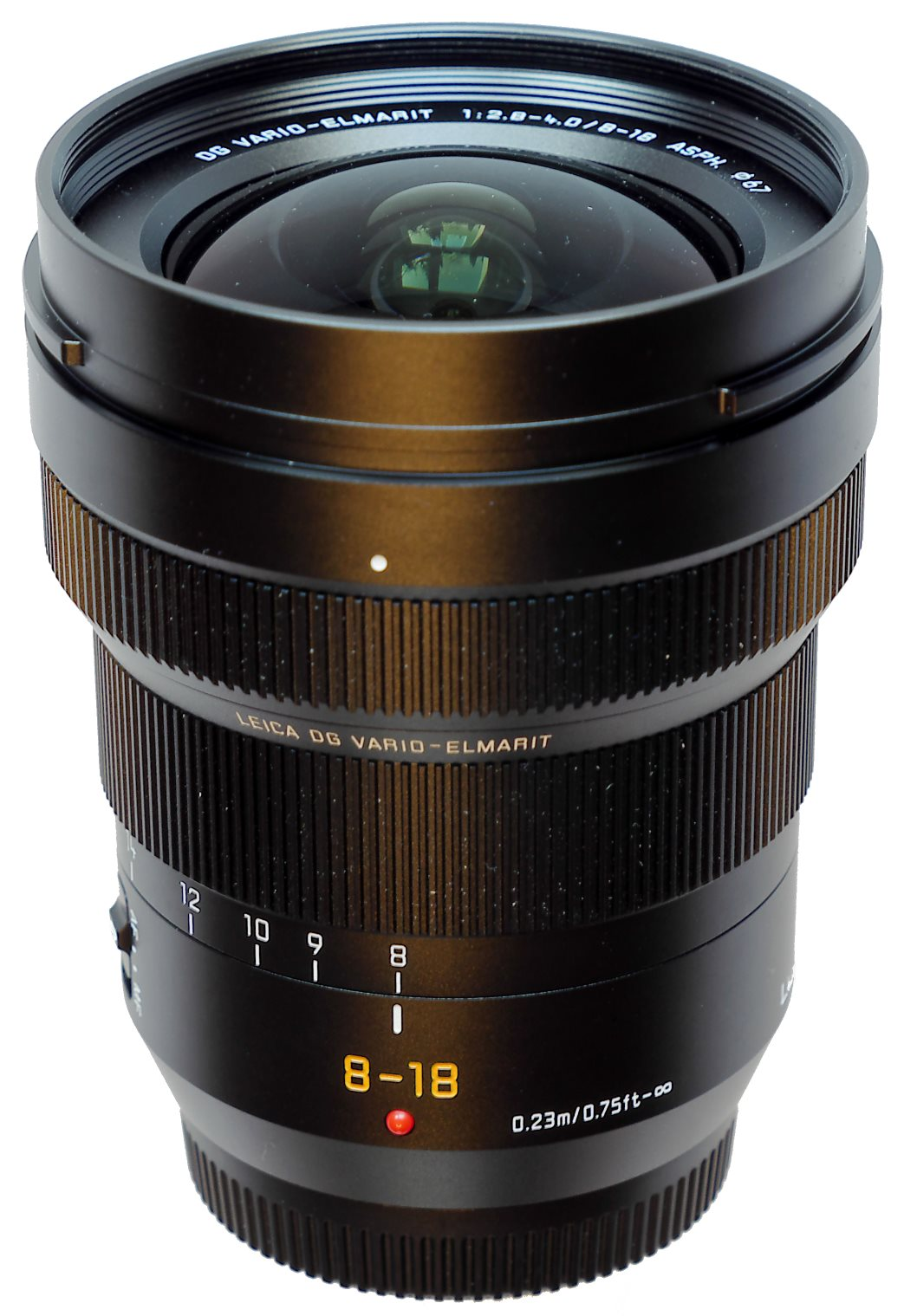
- Maker: Panasonic
- Lens mount(s): Micro Four Thirds

Technical data
- Type: ultra wide angle zoom
- Focus drive: stepper
- Focal length: 8-18 mm
- Focal length (35mm equiv.): 16-36 mm
- Crop factor: 2
- Aperture (max/min): f/2.8-f/4.0 / f/22
- Close focus distance: 0.23 m
- Max. magnification: 0.12
- Diaphragm blades: 7, circular
- Construction: 15 elements in 10 groups

Features
- Ultrasonic motor: Yes Yes
- Weather-sealing: Yes Yes
- Lens-based stabilization: No No
- Macro capable: No No
- Unique features: aspheric (Asph.), ultra high refraction (UHR), extrem low dispersion (ED)
- Application: landscapes / street photography / buildings

Physical
- Min. length: 88 mm
- Diameter: 73.4 mm
- Weight: 315 g
- Filter diameter: 67 mm

Accessories
- Lens hood: included
- Case: included

History
- Introduction: 2017

The Panasonic Leica DG Vario-Elmarit 8–18 mm f/2.8-f/4.0 lens is a digital compact ultra wide angle lens for Micro Four Thirds system cameras. It is a varifocal lens branded with the German label Leica, but manufactured by Panasonic in Japan.

== Description ==
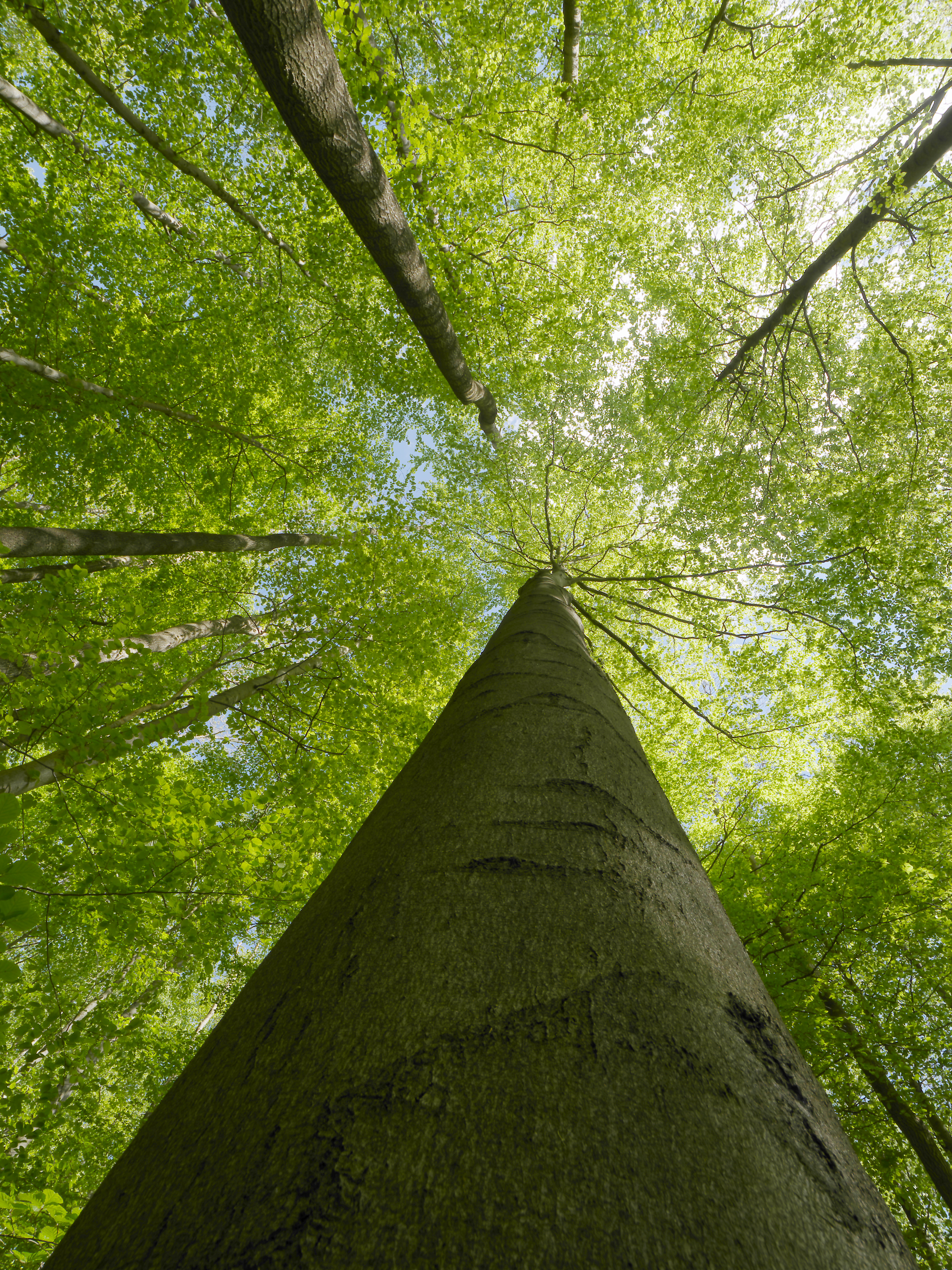
Beech trunk and crown in Hainich National Park taken from the ground at shortest focal length (8 millimeter)

It is one of the fastest autofocus zoom lenses with a maximum field of view of 107° within the Micro Four Thirds (MFT) system (as at end of 2018). Its weight is little more than 300 grammes, which is rather low compared to similar lenses.

There is almost no distortion visible in automatically compensated pictures taken at any focal length, and therefore, it is not a fisheye lens. Although there is a strongly protruding front lens, any plane filter can be attached via the 67-millimeter-thread. The lens is splash and dust proof as well as freeze proof down to -10 °C.

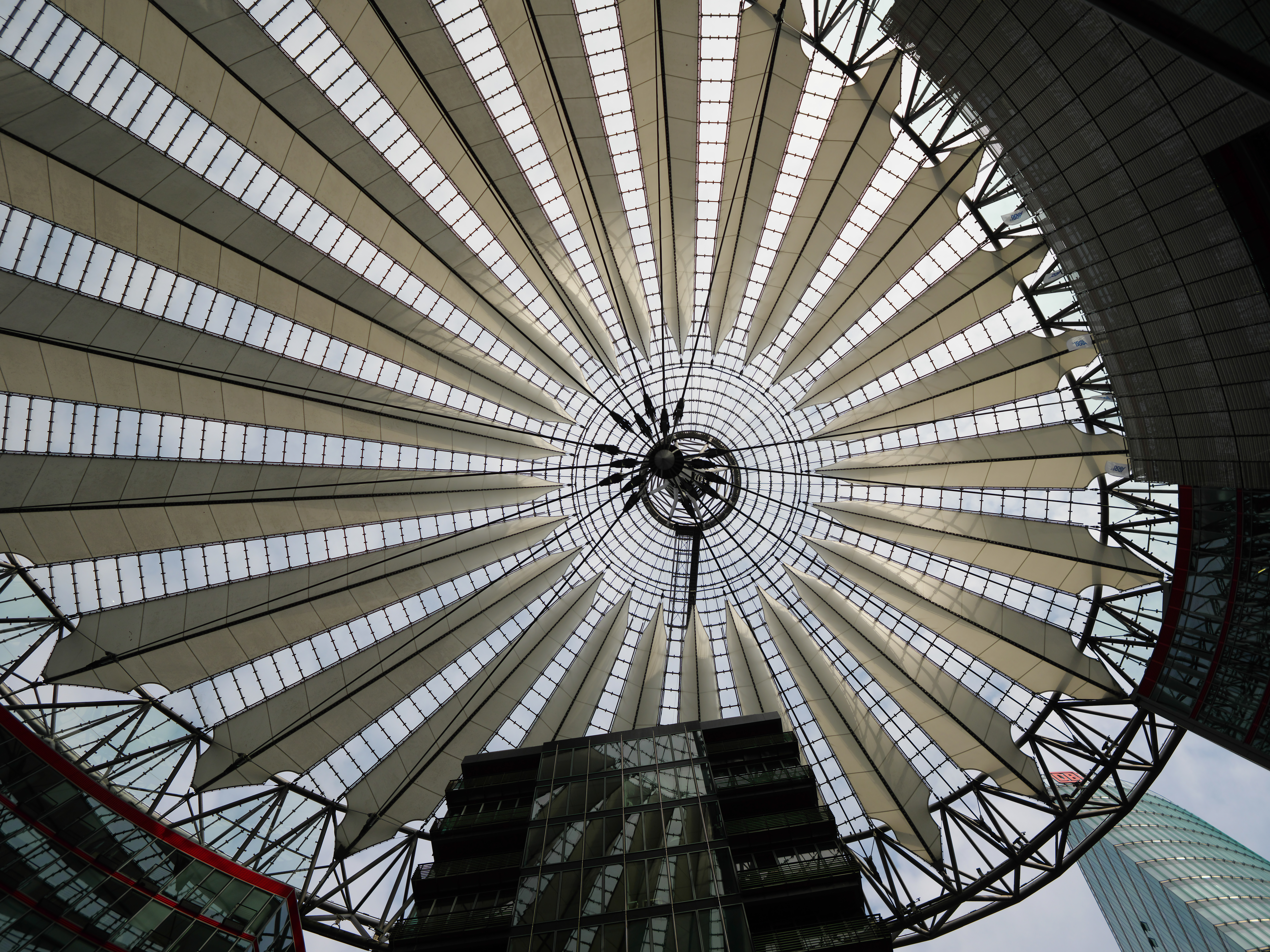
High-resolution 80 megapixel shot (taken with pixel shifting) of the roof of Sony Center in Berlin taken by the Leica DG at 8 millimeter focal length

The silent autofocus and the stepless aperture adjustment together with the fast focus tracking with 240 frames per second and high optical quality enable 4K resolution video shooting with this lens.

== Comparison ==
Due to the smaller image sensor size of the MFT system the depth of field is larger compared to full-frame sensor cameras if the lenses are operated at the same f-number.

Compared to other camera systems with differing normal focal lengths, and therefore different image sensor sizes, the following equivalent values apply to lenses with appropriate properties as the Leica DG 8–18 mm 4.0 in the MFT system. With the parameters given in the table in all camera systems the photographer will get the same angle of view, depth of field, diffraction limitation and motion blur:

Image sensor format	Minimum focal lengths at the same angle of view (diagonal angle ≈ 107°)	Maximum focal lengths at the same angle of view (diagonal angle ≈ 62°)	F-number at the same depth of field	ISO speed at the same exposure time
Nikon CX	6 mm	13.5 mm	2.8	100
MFT	8 mm	18 mm	4.0	200
APS-C	11 mm	24 mm	5.6	360
Full frame	16 mm	36 mm	8.0	800
