= Line-scan camera =

Method of capturing images

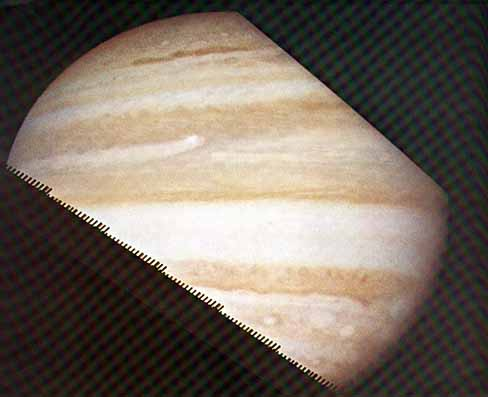
Pioneer 10's famous images of Jupiter were produced through the line-scan process, with the spacecraft's rotation scanning in one direction and movement in space in the other. Though normally not visible, this particular image retains artifacts of the scanning process.

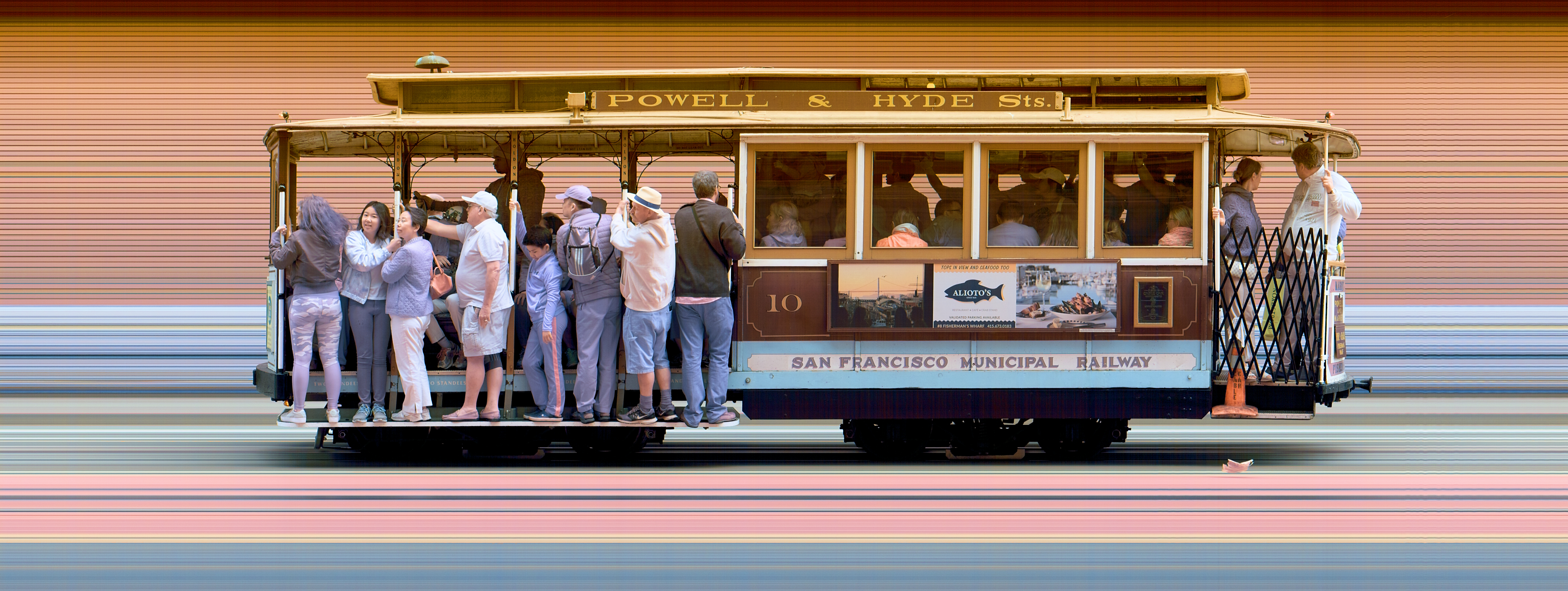
Modern line-scan camera image of a San Francisco cable car, imaged at 4000 frames per second. The background, which was unmoving, appears as a single vertical stripe.

A line-scan camera is a system for producing two-dimensional images using a single sensor element. They normally consist of a rapidly rotating mirror or prism placed in front of the sensor to provide scanning in one direction while the movement of the recording material, often photographic film, provides scanning in the second direction. They are similar in concept to the drum scanner, differing largely in form and function.

Line scanning was widely used for both visible light and, more commonly, infrared imagery from the 1960s through the 1980s, especially in aerial reconnaissance. Typical systems include the one used on the Corona spy satellites, which used a telescope that moved side-to-side while film was pulled across it, producing a series of stripes. Another famous example is the camera on Pioneer 10, which used a fixed-position polarimeter as its sensor, with the rotation of the spacecraft providing scanning in one direction while its movement through space provided the other.

Line scanning used in strip photography to capture the photo finish of a foot race

The introduction of sensitive array sensors in the 1980s and especially 1990s had led to the gradual disappearance of the technique in many roles. They remain in use for specialist systems where very high resolution or high sensitivity is required. One common use is in manufacturing to inspect printed surfaces like labels on products, in which case they are referred to as rotating line cameras. They are also used as the timing systems for races where a photo finish may occur.

Today the term line scanner is more commonly used to describe desktop flatbed image scanners, although these consist of a one-dimensional stripe of sensors instead of a single sensor. Modern line-scan cameras may be built in a similar fashion, using a stripe of sensors to image in one dimension and the movement of the camera or object in the other.
