= Superconducting camera =

Camera developed by the European Space Agency

The superconducting camera, SCAM, is an ultra-fast photon-counting camera developed by the European Space Agency. It is cooled to just 0.3 K (three-tenths of a degree Celsius above absolute zero). This enables its sensitive electronic detectors, known as superconducting tunnel junction detectors, to register almost every photon of light that falls onto it.

Its advantage over a charge-coupled device (CCD) is that it can measure both the brightness (rate) of the incoming photon stream and the color (wavelength or energy) of each individual photon.

The number of free primary electrons generated per photon event is proportional to the photon energy and amounts to ~18,000 per electronvolt. As a result, if the device is operated in single-photon count mode the energy of each captured photon can be calculated in the visible-light range, where photons have energies of a few electronvolts, each generating >20,000 electrons. In a normal CCD, only one primary electron is generated per photon, except for very energetic photons, like X-rays, where a normal CCD can operate in a similar way to a SCAM.

In 2006 the SCAM instrument was mounted on the ESA's Optical Ground Station telescope in order to observe the disintegration of Comet 73P/Schwassmann-Wachmann 3.
