= Multi-layer CCD =

A multi-layer CCD is a CCD image sensor that captures true RGB using stacked CCD sensor layers.

This concept was the subject of a 1978 Kodak patent application (issued 1986), but did not result in a working image sensor.

The concept resurfaced as part of an April Fools' Day prank press release from dpreview.com. When the joke was released in 2000, a remarkably similar device was under development at Foveon—the Foveon X3 image sensor, which is multi-layered but is not a CCD. The Foveon sensor was announced on dpreview.com in 2002, with sample images.
