= Pixel shifting =

Display technique to avoid image burn-in

Pixel shifting refers to various technical methods, either to diminish damage to displays by preventing burn-in of static images or to enhance resolution of displays, projectors, and digital imaging devices. The term is often used synonymously with the more specific term pixel shift.

== Purposes ==
=== Enhance character display resolution on terminals ===
Computer terminals such as the HP 2645A used a half-shift algorithm to move pixel positions by half a screen pixel in order to support the generation of multiple complex character sets.

=== Increase projection resolution ===
Pixel shifting has been implemented in video projectors to expand the native 1080p resolution to produce an effectively 4K image on the screen. An exemplary implementation by the electronics corporation JVC is referred to as "e-shift".

=== Increase capture or tonal resolution ===
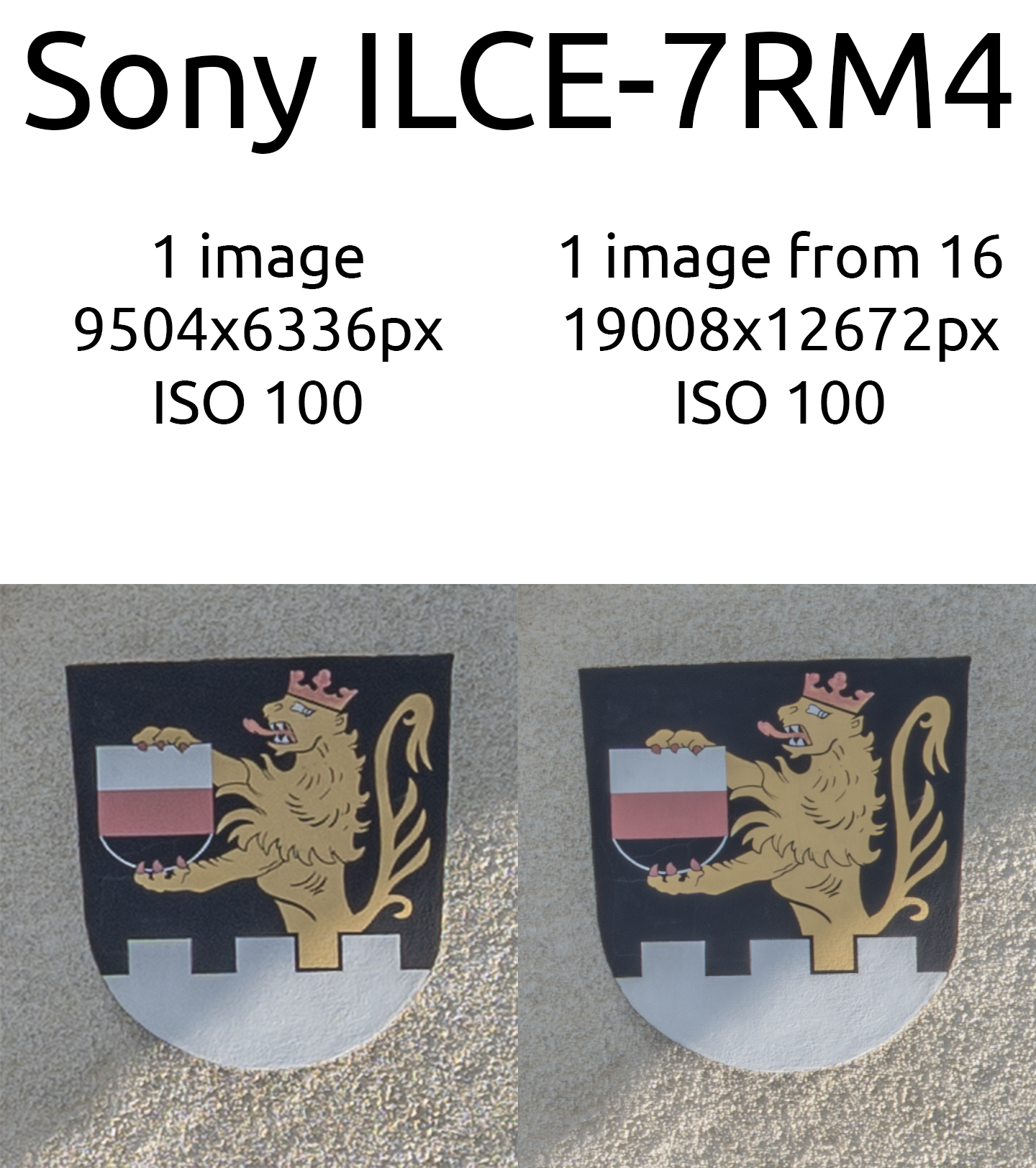
Simple image (left) and pixel shifted image (right) with less noise and higher resolution (click to enlarge)

Pixel shifting by movement of one or more sensors is a technique to increase resolution or colour rendering of image capturing devices.

The image at right displays the visible gain both in detail and in colour resolution produced by the Sony α7R IV 16-shot pixel shift mode, which results in a 240 Mpixel image, as compared to a single shot with the standard sensor resolution of 61 Mpixel. The crops taken from each image display the coat of arms at exactly the same size, albeit with different pixel counts.

==== One or more separate color channel sensors ====
Some camcorders and digital microscopes employ separate color channel sensors (usually RGB = red, green, blue) sensors.

For example, early high-definition camcorders used a 3CCD sensor block of 960 × 540 pixels each. Shifting the red and blue sensors (but not the green sensor) by 0.5 pixel in both vertical and horizontal directions permitted the recovery of a 1920 × 1080 luminance signal.

==== One multicolour channel sensor ====
Currently most consumer imaging devices (cameras, camcorders, smartphones) employ a single multicolour channel sensor, on which the RGB (red, green, blue) pixels are usually arranged in a Bayer pattern. Thus any mode of pixel shifting movement either by fractional or by whole pixel values, whether to obtain a more detailed image or to improve tonal resolution, must necessarily engage the whole sensor.

== Related features ==
The first stabilization mechanism for a still-camera sensor was implemented by Minolta in 2003 as a new feature of the DiMAGE A1. The purpose of this implementation was only to counteract camera shake. The first consumer still-camera that utilized sensor movement to enhance detail or tonal resolution was the K-3 II, released by Pentax in 2015.

== See also ==
- Colour co-site sampling – System of photographic colour sensing
- Microscanning
