= Channel-stopper =

In semiconductor device fabrication, channel-stopper or channel-stop is an area in semiconductor devices produced by implantation or diffusion of ions, by growing or patterning the silicon oxide, or other isolation methods in semiconductor material with the primary function to limit the spread of the channel area or to prevent the formation of parasitic channels (inversion layers).
