= Rotating line camera =

A rotating line camera is a digital camera that uses a linear CCD array to assemble a digital image as the camera rotates. The CCD array may consist of three sensor lines, one for each RGB color channel. Advanced rotating line cameras may have multiple linear CCD arrays on the focal plate and may capture multiple panoramic images during their rotation.

Line-scan technology is capable of capturing data extremely fast, and at very high image resolutions. Usually under these conditions, resulting collected image data can quickly exceed 100 MB in a fraction of a second. Line-scan-camera–based integrated systems, therefore are usually designed to streamline the camera's output in order to meet the system's objective, using computer technology which is also affordable.

Line-scan cameras intended for the parcel handling industry can integrate adaptive focusing mechanisms to scan six sides of any rectangular parcel in focus, regardless of angle, and size. The resulting 2-D captured images could contain, but are not limited to 1D and 2D barcodes, address information, and any pattern that can be processed via image processing methods. Since the images are 2-D, they are also human-readable and can be viewable on a computer screen. Advanced integrated systems include video coding, optical character recognition (OCR) and finish-line cameras for high speed sports.

== Panoscan ==
Panoscan MK-3 Camera

The Panoscan is a high resolution digital panoramic rotating line camera, manufactured by Panoscan Inc. The first Panoscan camera, called MK-1, was manufactured in 1999. The MK-2 and MK-3 models, with higher resolution and speed, followed. Panoscan uses a tri-linear CCD array and assembles an image by capturing a single line of pixels while rotating through a 400 degree arc. A full resolution, spherical image can be produced in under a minute. The camera produces digital images of 9,000 by 65,000 pixels that can be printed at 30 feet (10 metres) in length. The camera incorporates a pan mechanism and does not require an external unit.
