= Microscanning =

Microscanning is a method for increasing resolution of digital cameras. With the color co-site sampling identically colored pixels in several frames of the specimen, obtained by moving the sensor with a piezo mechanism in a regular raster, are combined to a sharp resulting image. The detector, however, can also be translated by a fraction of the dot pitch: this way also the interstitial space between sensor pixels gets scanned and the number of pixels in the final image is increased. Three positions on the x and y axes increase the image size by a factor of 9, for instance from the common 1388 × 1040 pixels to 4164 × 3120 pixels (see Sony ICX285 series). The color co-site sampling used at the same time ensures correct reproduction of colors at the pixel density produced.

Whether the spatial resolution will increase accordingly, depends on the optical resolution of the complete system. The relevant parameter is the resolving power, i.e. how many lines per mm can be resolved. It increases with the aperture of the optical system and is inversely proportional to its magnification. As a result, a low-resolution camera with 500 lines would be enough for an 100X objective with 0.9 aperture. On the other hand, low-magnification objectives profit most from micro scanning: for instance for a 2,5X objective with N.A.=0.12 cameras with as high as 2500 lines resolution could be used.
