= List of acronyms: Z =

This list contains acronyms, initialisms, and pseudo-blends that begin with the letter Z.

For the purposes of this list:

- acronym = an abbreviation pronounced as if it were a word, e.g., SARS = severe acute respiratory syndrome, pronounced to rhyme with cars
- initialism = an abbreviation pronounced wholly or partly using the names of its constituent letters, e.g., CD = compact disc, pronounced cee dee
- pseudo-blend = an abbreviation whose extra or omitted letters mean that it cannot stand as a true acronym, initialism, or portmanteau (a word formed by combining two or more words).

(a) = acronym, e.g.: SARS – (a) severe acute respiratory syndrome
(i) = initialism, e.g.: CD – (i) compact disc
(p) = pseudo-blend, e.g.: UNIFEM – (p) United Nations Development Fund for Women
(s) = symbol (none of the above, representing and pronounced as something else; for example: MHz – megahertz)

Some terms are spoken as either acronym or initialism, e.g., VoIP, pronounced both as voyp and V-O-I-P.

(Main list of acronyms)

- z – (s) Zepto
- Z – (s) Zetta

== ZA ==
- za – (s) Zhuang languages (ISO 639-1 code)
- zA – (s) Zeptoampere
- ZA – (s) South Africa (ISO 3166 digram)
- ZA – Zambia (FIPS 10-4 country code) – Zettaampere
- ZAF – (s) South Africa (ISO 3166 trigram)
- ZAMS – (i) Zero age main sequence
- ZANU-PF – (i) Zimbabwe African National Union – Patriotic Front
- ZAR – (s) South African rand (ISO 4217 currency code)
- ZAR – Zaire (ISO 3166 trigram, obsolete 1997)
- ZAS – (i/a) Zylinder Abschaltung System

== ZB ==
- ZBT – (i) Zero-Balance Transfer (accounting)

== ZC ==
- zC – (s) Zeptocoulomb
- ZC – (s) Zettacoulomb
- ZCM – (n) ZENworks Configuration Management
- ZCMK – (a) Zone Control Master Key
- ZCU – (i) Zimbabwe Cricket Union

== ZF ==
- zF – (s) Zeptofarad
- ZF – (s) Zettafarad

== ZG ==
- zg – (s) Zeptogram
- Zg – (s) Zettagram

== ZH ==
- zh – (s) Chinese language (ISO 639-1 code)
- zH – (s) Zeptohenry
- ZH – (s) Zettahenry
- zha – (s) Zhuang languages (ISO 639-2 code)
- zho – (s) Chinese language (ISO 639-2 code)

== ZI ==
- Zi – (s) Zebi
- ZI – (s) Zimbabwe (FIPS 10-4 country code)
- ZIF – (s) Zero Insertion Force (The device on a)
- ZIP – (a) Zone Improvement Plan code
- ZIRP – (a) Zero interest-rate policy

== ZJ ==
- zJ – (s) Zeptojoule
- ZJ – (s) Zettajoule

== ZK ==
- zK – (s) Zeptokelvin
- ZK – (s) Zettakelvin

== ZL ==
- zL – (s) Zeptolitre
- ZL – (s) Zettalitre

== ZM ==
- zm – (s) Zeptometre
- Zm – (s) Zettametre
- ZM – (s) Zambia (ISO 3166 digram)
- ZMB – (s) Zambia (ISO 3166 trigram)
- ZMK – (s) Zambian kwacha (ISO 4217 currency code)

== ZN ==
- zN – (s) Zeptonewton
- Zn – (s) Zinc
- ZN – (s) Zettanewton

== ZO ==
- ZOPFAN – (i) Zone of Peace, Freedom And Neutrality

== ZR ==
- Zr – (s) Zirconium
- ZR – (s) Zaire (ISO 3166 digram; obsolete 1997)

== ZS ==
- zs – (s) Zeptosecond
- Zs – (s) Zettasecond
- ZS – (s) Zettasiemens

== ZT ==
- zT – (s) Zeptotesla
- ZT – (s) Zettatesla

== ZU ==
- zu – (s) Zulu language (ISO 639-1 code)
- ZUG – (a) Z User Group
- ZUI – (a) Zooming User Interface ("zoo-wee")
- zul – (s) Zulu language (ISO 639-2 code)

== ZV ==
- zV – (s) Zeptovolt
- ZV – (s) Zettavolt

== ZW ==
- zW – (s) Zeptowatt
- ZW – (s) Zettawatt
- ZW – Zimbabwe (ISO 3166 digram)
- ZWD – (s) Zimbabwe dollar (ISO 4217 currency code)
- ZWE – (s) Zimbabwe (ISO 3166 trigram)

== ZZ ==
- ZZZ – (p) to be tired (internet slang)
