= Zinc (disambiguation) =

Zinc is a metallic chemical element.

Zinc may also refer to:

== Chemistry ==
- Zinc compounds
- Isotopes of zinc
- Zinc Group Element

=== Electrochemistry ===
- zinc plating sacrificial galvanization
- Zinc-ion battery, an electrochemical cell
- Zinc–air battery, an electrochemical cell
- Zinc–carbon battery, an electrochemical cell
- Silver zinc battery, an electrochemical cell
- Nickel–zinc battery, an electrochemical cell

== Groups, organizations ==
- Zinc Inc., a U.S. mobile messaging platform company
- Lazarus Group, a cybercrime group, also known as Zinc
- Zinc Football, Udaipur, Rajasthan, India; a pro soccer team

=== Bands ===
- The Zincs, a British 4-piece band
- Zinc (band), an Australian three piece pop rock band from 2002 to 2007
- Zinc (The Green Album), the backing band on The Green Album, the 1983 Eddie Jobson album

== Computing ==
- Zinc Application Framework, a development platform for GUI programs
- ZINC database, a resource for computational drug discovery

== People ==
- DJ Zinc, British DJ, born as Benjamin Pettit (1972)

== Places ==
- Zinc Township, Boone County, Arkansas, USA
- Zinc, Arkansas, USA; a town in Boone County
- Zinc Swinging Bridge, Zinc, Arkansas, USA; over the Sugar Orchard Creek
- Zinc House Hotel, Atlanta, California, USA

== Radio stations ==
- Zinc 96, an Australian FM radio station
- Zinc 100.7, an Australian FM radio station
- Zinc 102.7, an Australian FM radio station

== Other uses ==
- Zinc (horse), a British Thoroughbred racehorse (1820–1840)
- Zinc (roof), a type of corrugated sheet metal roof

== See also ==
- Zinc cycle, in ecology and geology
- Zinc etching, 2-d artworks
- Zinc white, inorganic pigment composed of zinc oxide
- Zingiber cassumunar (ZINCS), a species of ginger
- Zn (disambiguation)
- Zync
- Zincke, a surname
- Zinke, a surname
- Zink (disambiguation)
