= Zink =

Zink can refer to:

== People ==
- Charlie Zink (born 1979), American baseball player
- Nell Zink (born 1964), American novelist
- Nicolaus Zink (1812–1887), founder of Sisterdale, Texas
- Otto Zink (1925–2008), German politician

== Music ==
- Zink, another name for the cornett or cornetto, a Renaissance wind instrument
- Zink (Faroese band), a former Faroese punk band
- Zink, an album by Dutch musician Bloem de Ligny

== Other uses ==
- Zink, a Gallium3D driver which acts as a translation layer between OpenGL and Vulkan
- Zink (printing), an inkless printing technology used in instant photo printers
- Zink Cars, a former constructor of Formula Vee and other racing cars founded by Ed Zink

== See also ==
- Zinc (disambiguation)
- Zincke, a surname
- Zinke, a surname
- Zync Global, an Indian company
