= ZRS =

ZRS may refer to:

== Organisations ==
- Union of the Workers of Slovakia (Slovak: Združenie robotníkov Slovenska), a political party
- Railways of Republika Srpska (Serbian: Željeznice Republike Srpske), a rail operator in Bosnia and Herzegovina
- Association of Radio Amateurs of Slovenia (Slovene: Zveza radioamaterjev Slovenije), a non-profit

== Military ==
- A US Navy hull classification symbol: Rigid airship scout (ZRS)

== See also ==
- ZR (disambiguation)
