= ZF =

ZF, Z-F, or Zf may refer to:

== Groups, organizations, companies ==
- ZF Friedrichshafen (ZF, originally Zahnradfabrik Friedrichshafen), the 'ZF Group', a German supplier of automobile transmissions
- Z+F UK (Zoller & Fröhlich), a laser measurement and scanning equipment supplier
- Ziarul Financiar (zf.ro), a Romanian financial newspaper
- Zionist Federation of Great Britain and Ireland, an organization established to campaign for a permanent homeland for the Jewish people

== Mathematics, logic, science, medicine, engineering, technology, metrology ==
- Laminas, a web framework implemented with PHP that was formerly known as Zend Framework
- Zero flag (ZF, Z), in computing, in microprocessors
- Zermelo–Fraenkel set theory, a system of axioms in mathematical set theory
- Zinc finger, a protein domain that interacts with zinc ion to bind to DNA
- Zona fasciculata, the middle zone of the adrenal cortex
- zeptofarad (zF), 10^{−21}F (farads)
- zettafarad (ZF), 10^{+21}F (farads)
- ZF, the catalogue entry prefix for the ZFOURGE galaxy survey

== People ==
- Zugsführer (ZF, German: Zgf, lit. 'platoon leader'), an Austrian Bundesheer equivalent to Master Corporal (OR-4)
- Zugführer (ZF, German: ZgFhr, lit. 'platoon leader'), a German/Swiss non-commissioned appointment equivalent to the commissioned Second Lieutenant (OF-1)
- Zelda Fitzgerald (Z. F.; 1900–1948), wife of F. Scott Fitzgerald

== Other uses ==
- Z Fighters, the protagonists of the Dragon Ball saga
- Nikon Zf, a full-frame mirrorless camera produced by Nikon

== See also ==
- ZFS (disambiguation)
