= Sam Paganini =

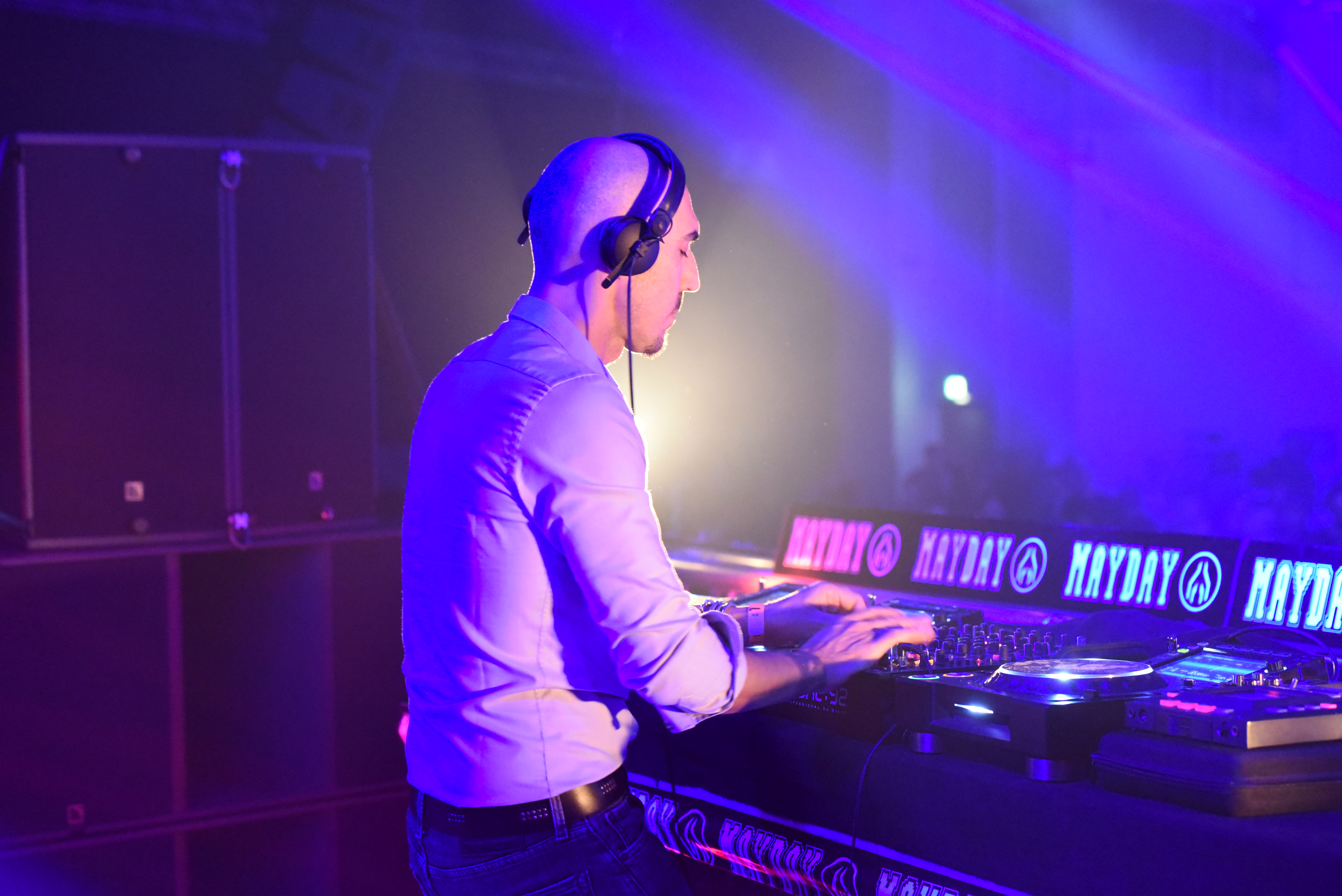

Background information
- Also known as: Paganini Traxx
- Origin: Treviso, Veneto, Italy
- Genres: Electronica
- Labels: Cocoon; Drumcode; Plus 8

Sam Paganini is an Italian DJ and producer from Treviso, Veneto, Italy.

== Career ==
His 1997 song, "Zoe", made #47 on the UK Singles Chart. He has since released many singles and EPs under his given name, including the very successful Body to Body EP on Cocoon Recordings. In 2014, Sam released his debut album, Satellite, on Drumcode Records. The album was received very well, and one of the tracks from the album, "Rave," remained in the Beatport Techno Top 10 for six months, and has remained in the Techno Top 100 for a year as of September 2015.

== Selected discography ==
=== As Paganini Traxx ===
- Zoe (S3, 1996)

=== As Sam Paganini ===
- Shibuya's Cosplayer (With Johnny Kaos, Android Muziq, 2010)
- Cobra EP (Plus 8 Records, 2011)
- Prisma EP (Drumcode, 2012)
- Eros EP (Drumcode, 2012)
- Body To Body (Cocoon Recordings, 2013)
- Black Leather EP (Drumcode, 2013)
- Shade (Driving Forces Recordings, 2014)
- Satellite (Album, Drumcode, 2014)
- The Beat EP (Drumcode, 2016)
- Zenith (JAM, 2017)
- Astro / Pulse EP (JAM, 2018)
- Reflections (JAM, 2020)
- Light + Shadow (JAM, 2022)
