= Zoe =

Zoe or variants may refer to:

== People ==
- Zoe (name), including a list of people and fictional characters with the name
  - Zoë (British singer) (Zoë Pollock, born 1969)
  - Zoë (Austrian singer) (Zoë Straub, born 1996)

== Arts and entertainment ==
=== Film and television ===
- Zoe (2001 film), an independent coming-of-age adventure-drama film
- Zoe (2018 film), an American romantic science fiction film
- Zoé (film) , a 1954 French comedy film
- ZOE Broadcasting Network, in the Philippines
  - ZOE TV, its flagship TV station
- Zoe, Duncan, Jack and Jane, later Zoe..., an American sitcom

=== Music ===
- Zoé (band), a rock band from Mexico
- Zoë Records, an independent record label
- Zoe, an operetta by Giorgio Miceli (1836–1895)
- Zoë (album), by Zoë Badwi, 2011
- "Zoe" (song), by Paganini Traxx, 1997
- "Zoe", a song by Stereophonics from the 2013 album Graffiti on the Train
- "Zoe", a song by Paul Kelly from the 2020 album The A to Z Recordings

=== Other media ===
- Zooey Magazine, American quarterly

== Places ==
- Zoe, Kentucky, a town in Lee County, US
- Zoe, Oklahoma, Le Flore County, US

== Science, technology and transportation ==
- Zoe Motors, an American automobile manufacturer
- Zoé (reactor), the first French atomic reactor
- Zoë (robot), mapping life in the Atacama Desert of Chile
- Renault Zoe, an electric car

== Other uses ==
- Zo'é, a native tribe in the State of Pará, Brazil
  - Zo'é language
- Zoe (horse) (1825–1842), a racehorse
- Zoe (moon) the satellite of 58534 Logos
- Zoe (philosophy), a form of life postulated by Giorgio Agamben
- Zoe Health Study, a health research project of British company Zoe Limited
- Zinc oxide eugenol, used in dentistry
- Zoe Theatre, in Pittsfield, Illinois, U.S.
- Zoe or Zoê, an aeon in some gnostic belief systems

== See also ==
- List of storms named Zoe
- Zoey 101, a Nickelodeon TV show
- Zoea, a larval stage of some crustaceans
