= Nikon Nikkor Z 40 mm f/2 =

Nikkor Z 40 mm f/2
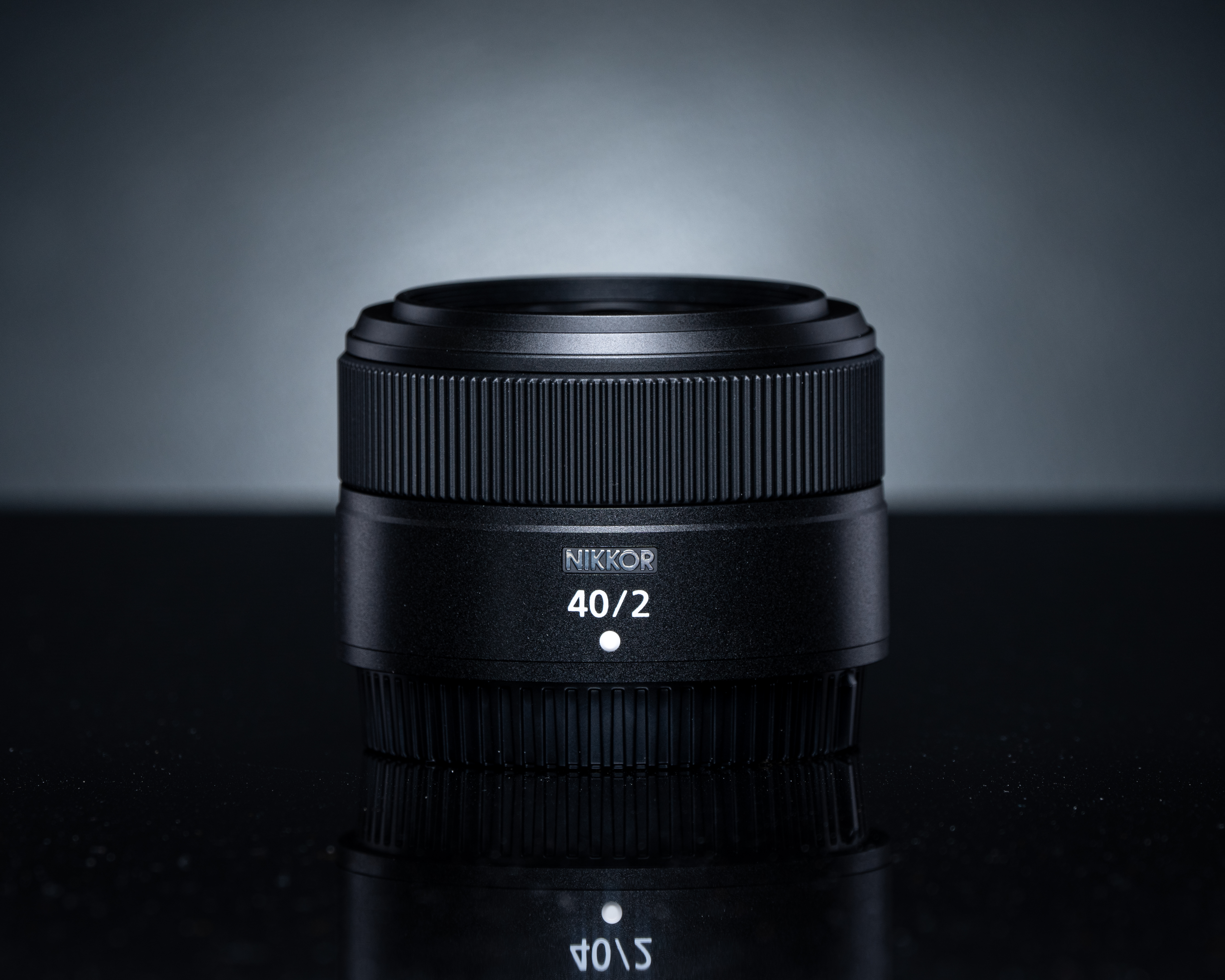
- Maker: Nikon
- Lens mount: Z-mount

Technical data
- Type: Prime
- Focus drive: Stepping motor
- Focal length: 40mm
- Image format: FX (full frame)
- Aperture (max/min): f/2–16
- Close focus distance: 0.29m
- Max. magnification: 1:5.9
- Diaphragm blades: 9 (rounded)
- Construction: 6 elements in 4 groups

Features
- Lens-based stabilization: No No
- Macro capable: No No
- Application: Normal Lens

Physical
- Max. length: 45.5 mm
- Diameter: 70 mm
- Weight: 170 g
- Filter diameter: 52 mm

Software
- Latest firmware: 1.10 (as of 20 August 2024)
- User flashable: Yes Yes
- Lens ID: 25

Angle of view
- Diagonal: 57° (FX); 38°50' (DX)

History
- Introduction: September 2021

Retail info
- MSRP: 299 USD (as of 2021)

The Nikon Nikkor Z 40 mm f/2 is a full-frame prime lens manufactured by Nikon for use on Nikon Z-mount mirrorless cameras.

== Introduction ==
On June 2, 2021, Nikon announced the development of the lens (along with the development of Nikkor Z 28 mm f/2.8). The lens was released on September 14, 2021. The lens does not come with a lens hood.

Dustin Abbott concluded that the lens has a lot of strengths and only a few weaknesses. He highlighted its great price to performance ratio, fast and accurate autofocus, weather sealing, pretty bokeh, low distortion and fringing and excellent detail when slightly stopped down as positives, while strong vignetting, missing lens hood and the lens using a plastic mount as negatives. David Crewe of PetaPixel described the lens as discreet, lightweight, affordable and useful, while praising its edge-to-edge sharpness, silent autofocus, well-engineered lens body, smooth bokeh, with vignetting affecting only images shot wide open. For negatives, he pointed out the lack of lens hood and an additional control ring (besides the single configurable ring that is manual focus by default). Spencer Cox of Photography Life concluded that the lens offers a good optical performance at a reasonable price and a best-in-class weight. He praised its tight build quality, excellent autofocus accuracy and speed, very good distortion and lateral chromatic aberration performance, light weight, small size and low price. For the cons, its plastic lens mount, lack of controls on the lens, busy bokeh in moderately out-of-focus areas and vignetting were mentioned.

== Special Edition (SE) ==
On November 8, 2022, Nikon also announced an otherwise optically identical Special Edition (SE) version of the lens, which adopts a retro design to be matched with the Nikon Zfc and Zf cameras. The SE lens was released on December 14, 2022, and uses the same firmware as the non-SE version.

== Features ==
- 40 mm focal length (approximately equivalent field of view of a 60 mm lens when used on a DX format camera)
- Autofocus using a "new, high-torque" stepping motor (STM), focus-by-wire manual focus ring
- 6 elements in 4 groups (including 2 aspherical lens elements)
- 9-blade rounded diaphragm
- One customizable control ring (manual focusing by default, aperture, ISO and exposure compensation functions can be assigned to it)
- Internal focusing (IF lens)
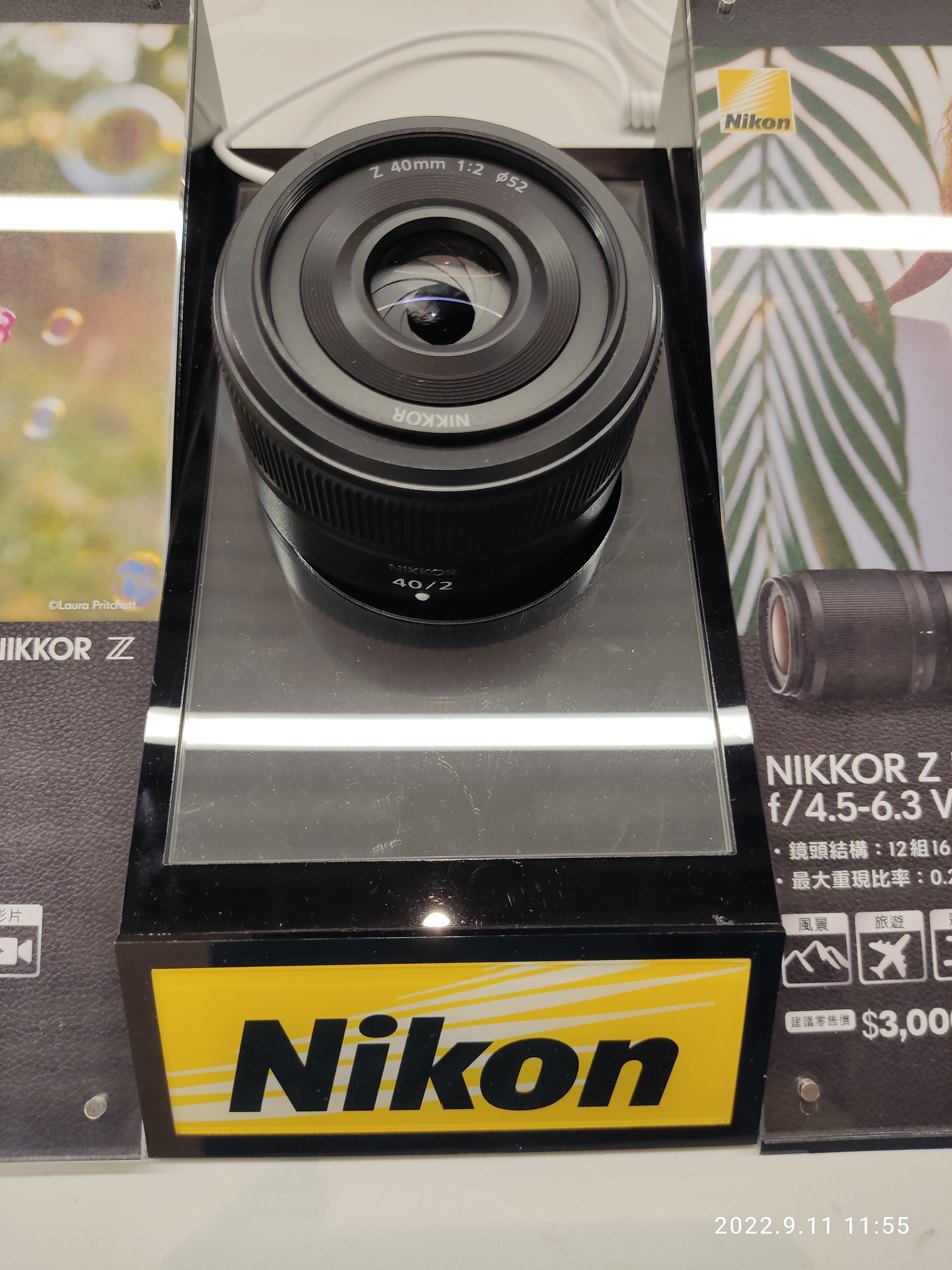
The lens on display

== Awards ==
The lens was awarded with the iF Design Award 2024 and the Japan Institute of Design Promotion Good Design 2023 award (both along with the Nikon Zf camera and the Nikkor Z 28 mm f/2.8 SE lens).

== Sample images ==
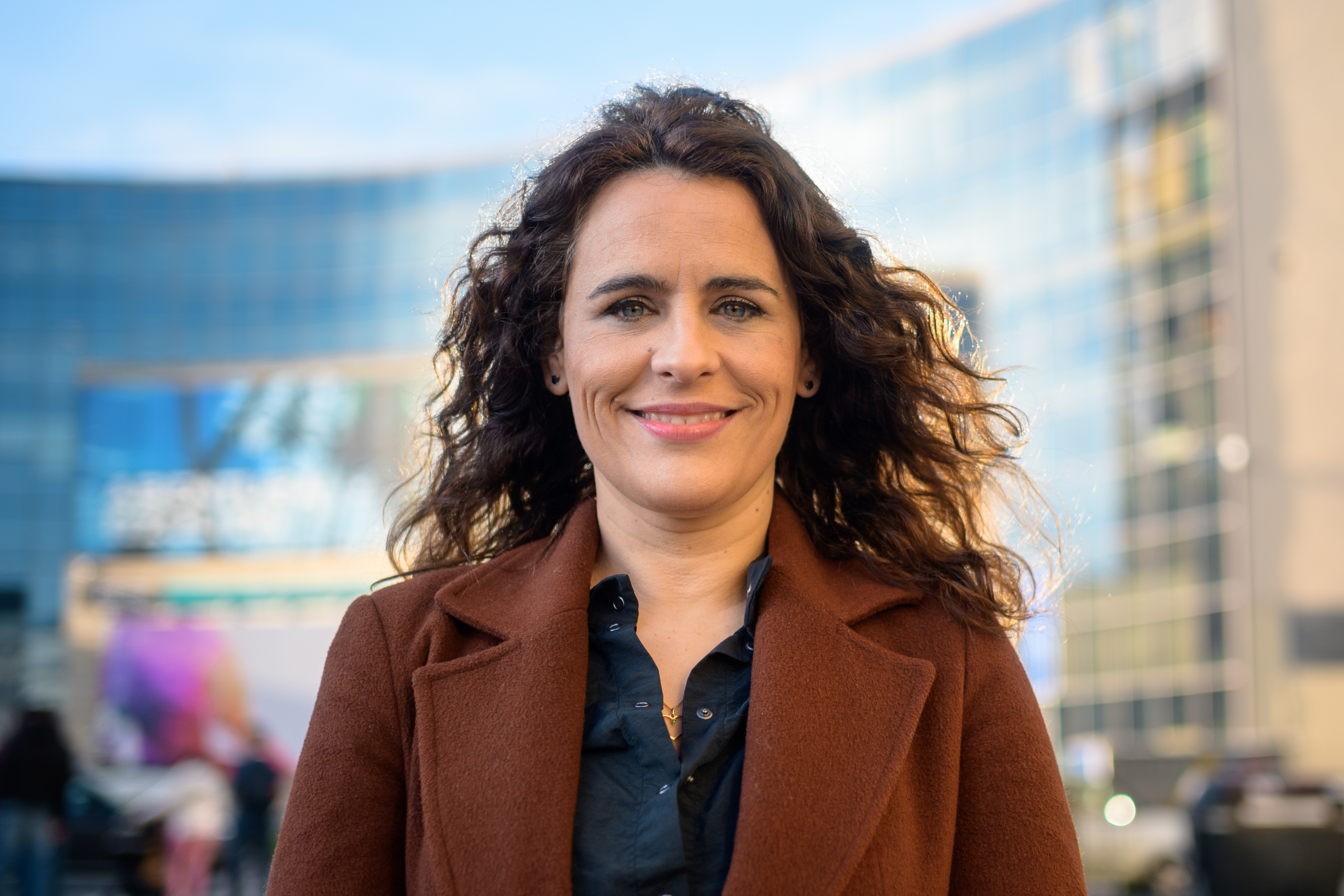
At f/2

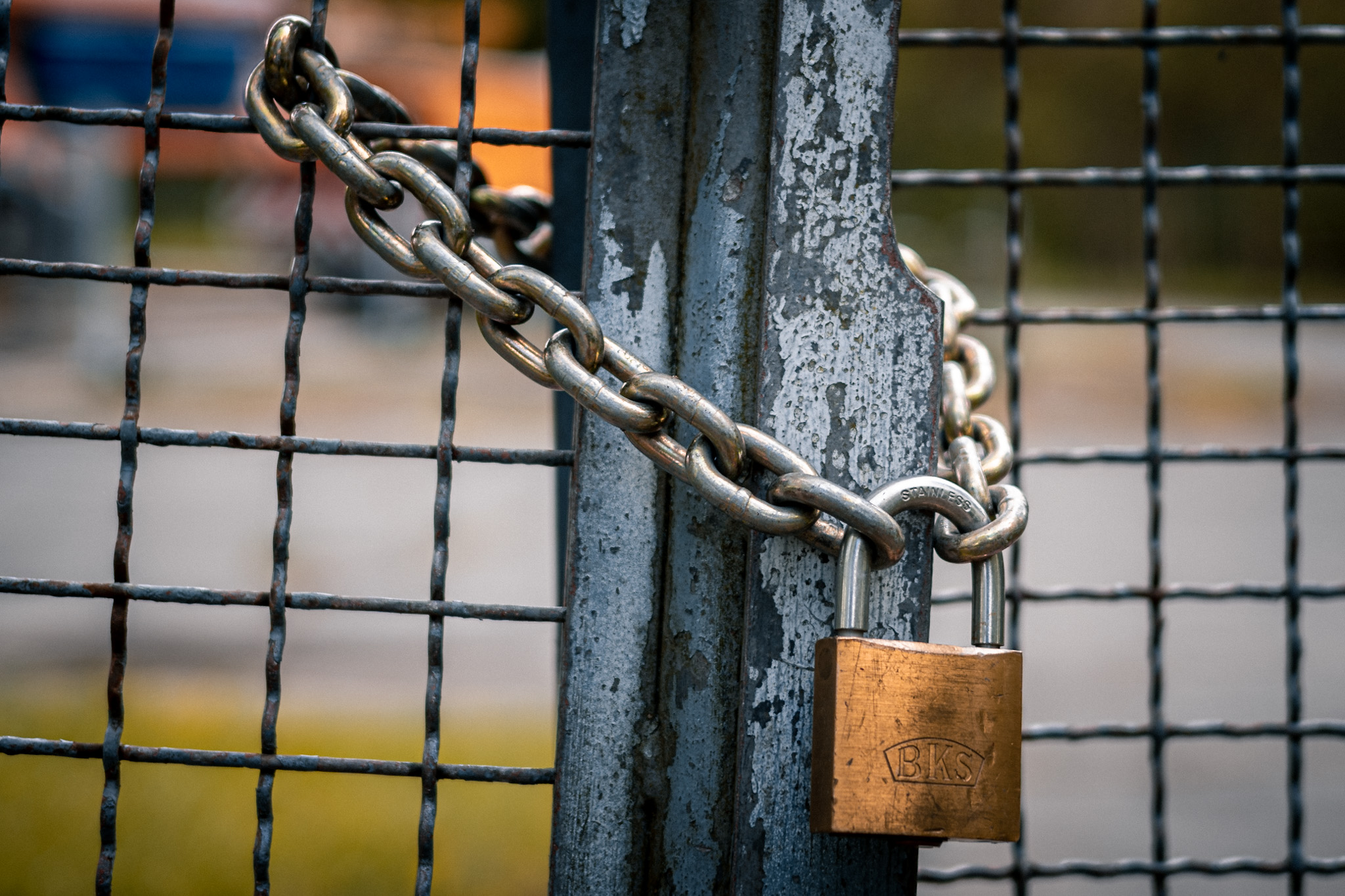
At f/2.2, (1.5×)

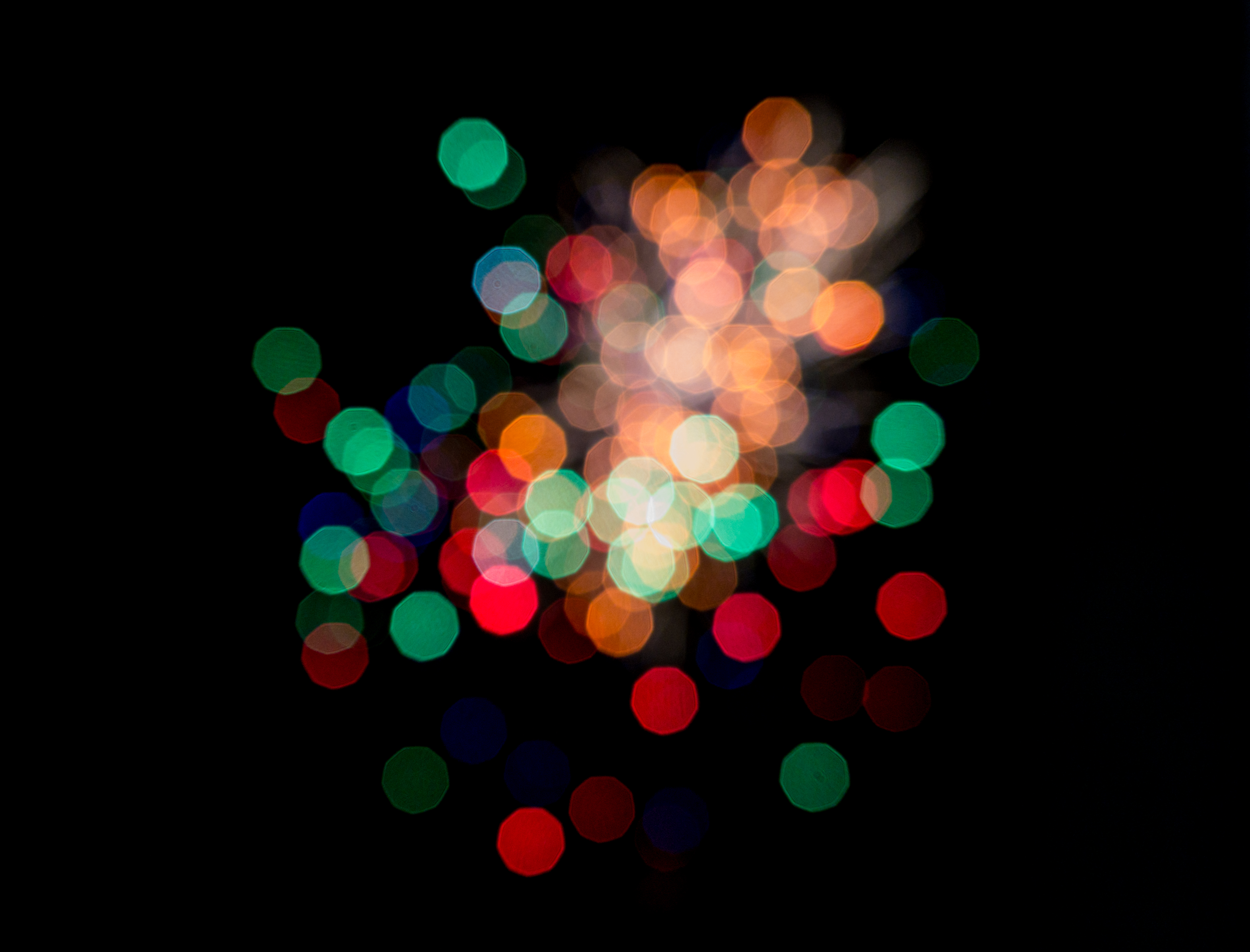
Bokeh at f/4

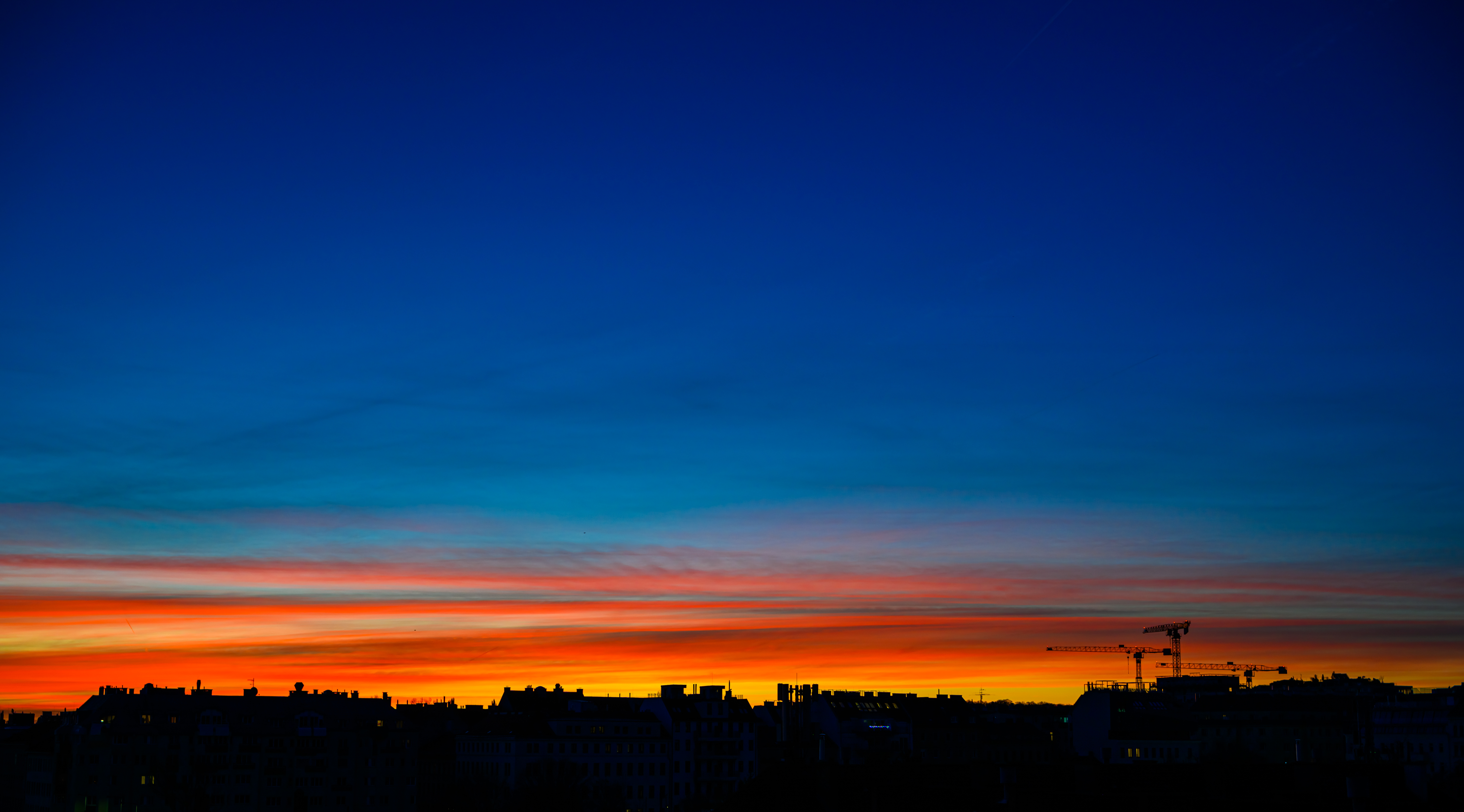
At f/4.5

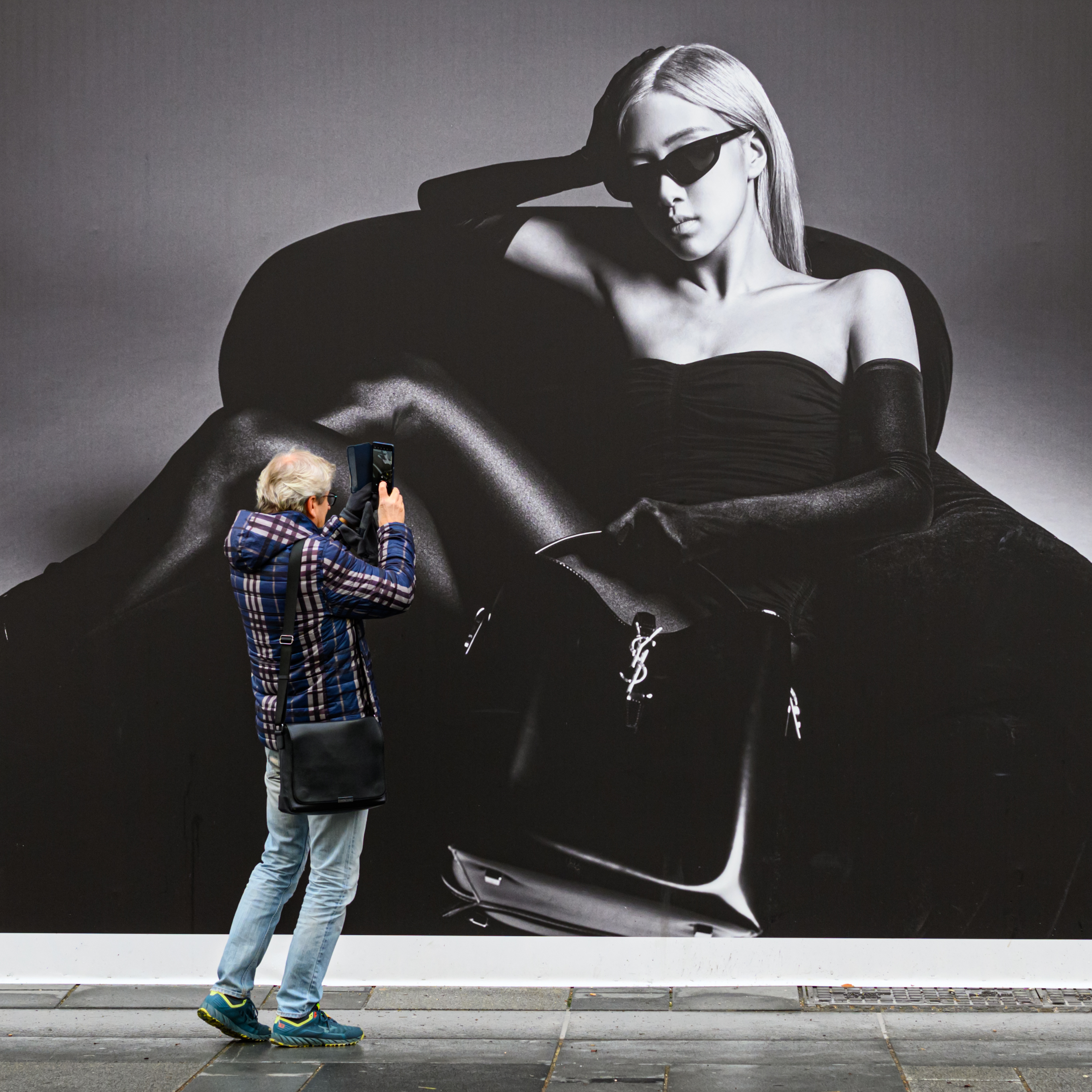
At f/4.5, (1.5×)

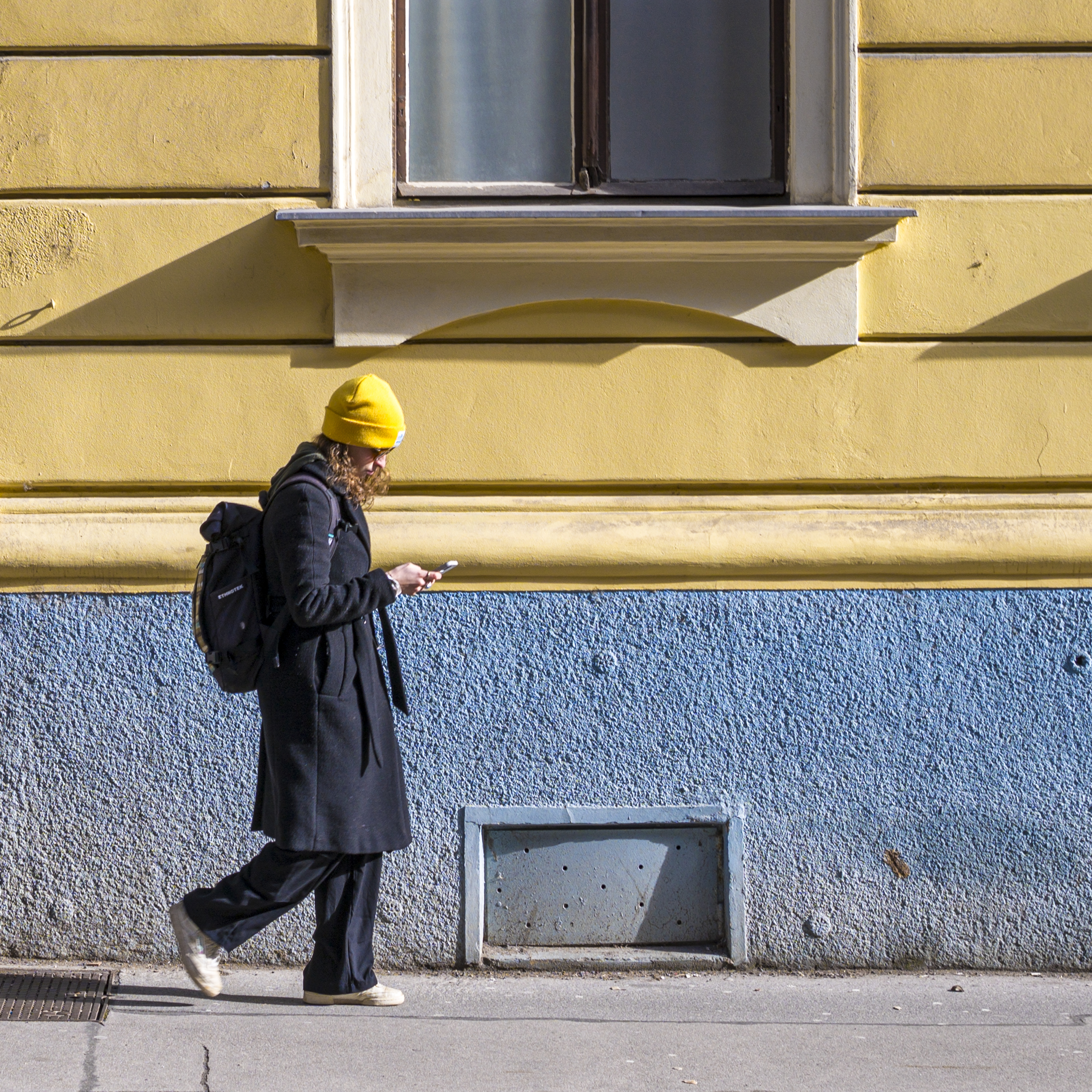
At f/5.6

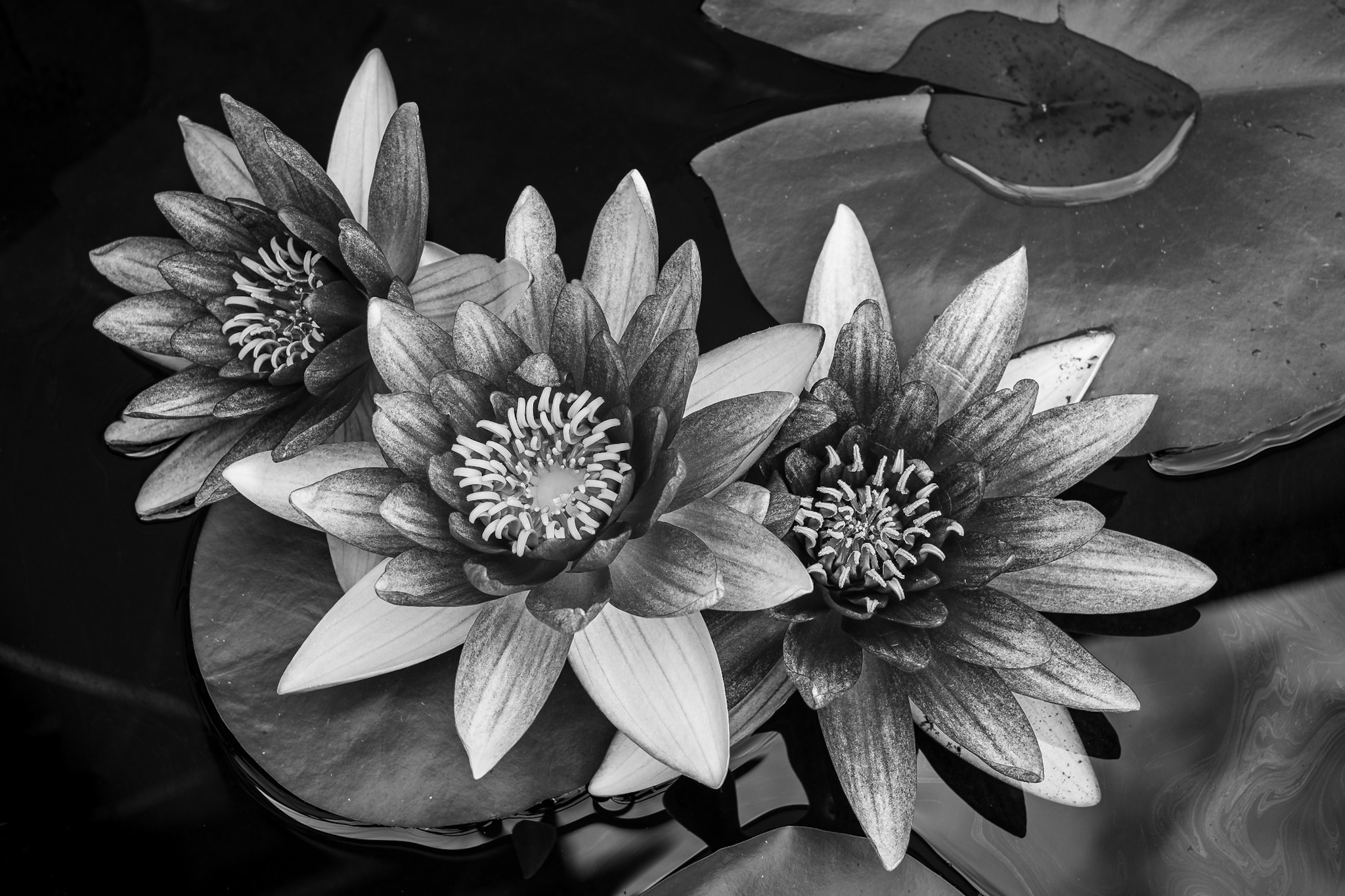
At f/5.6, (1.5×)

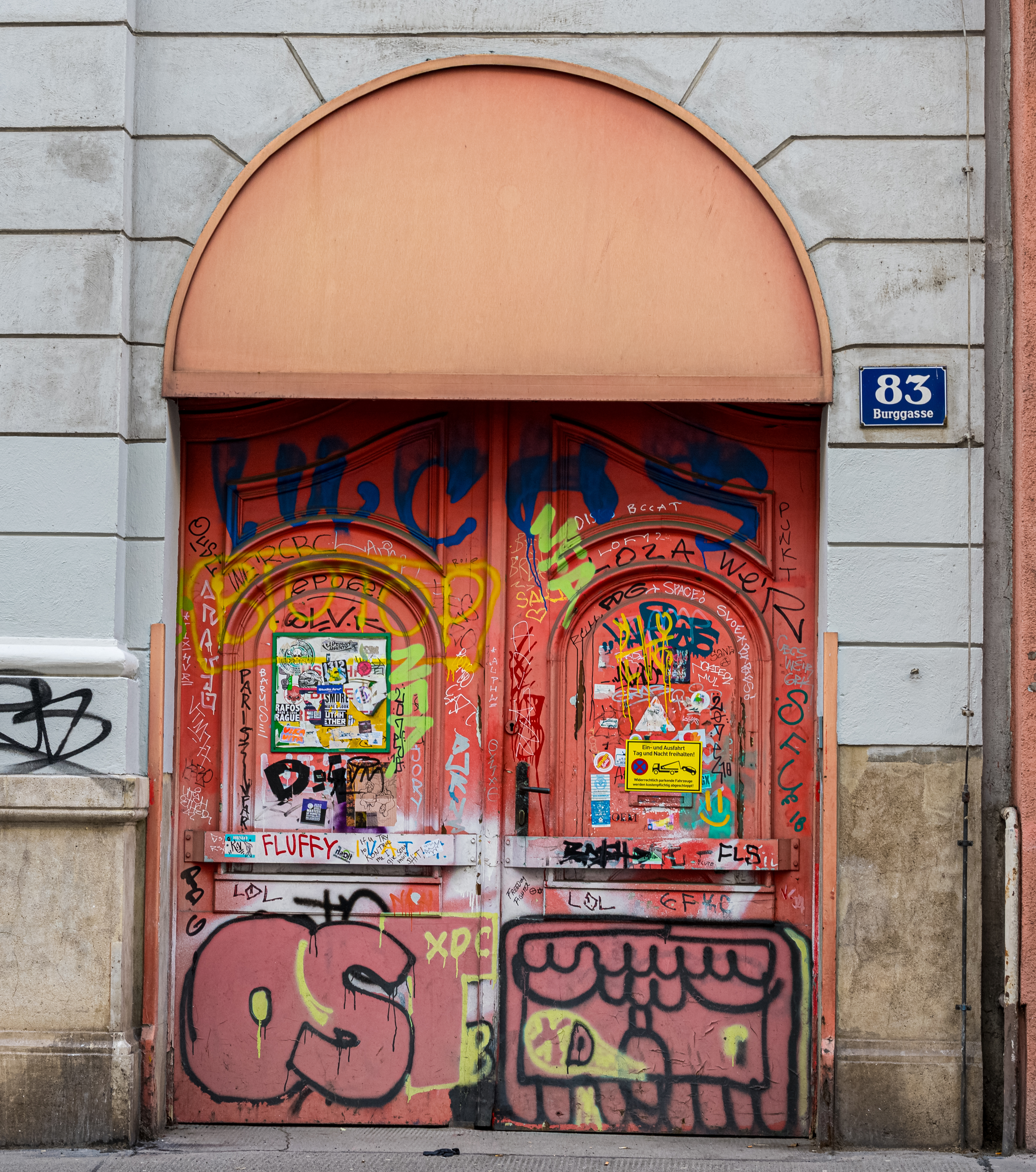
At f/6.3

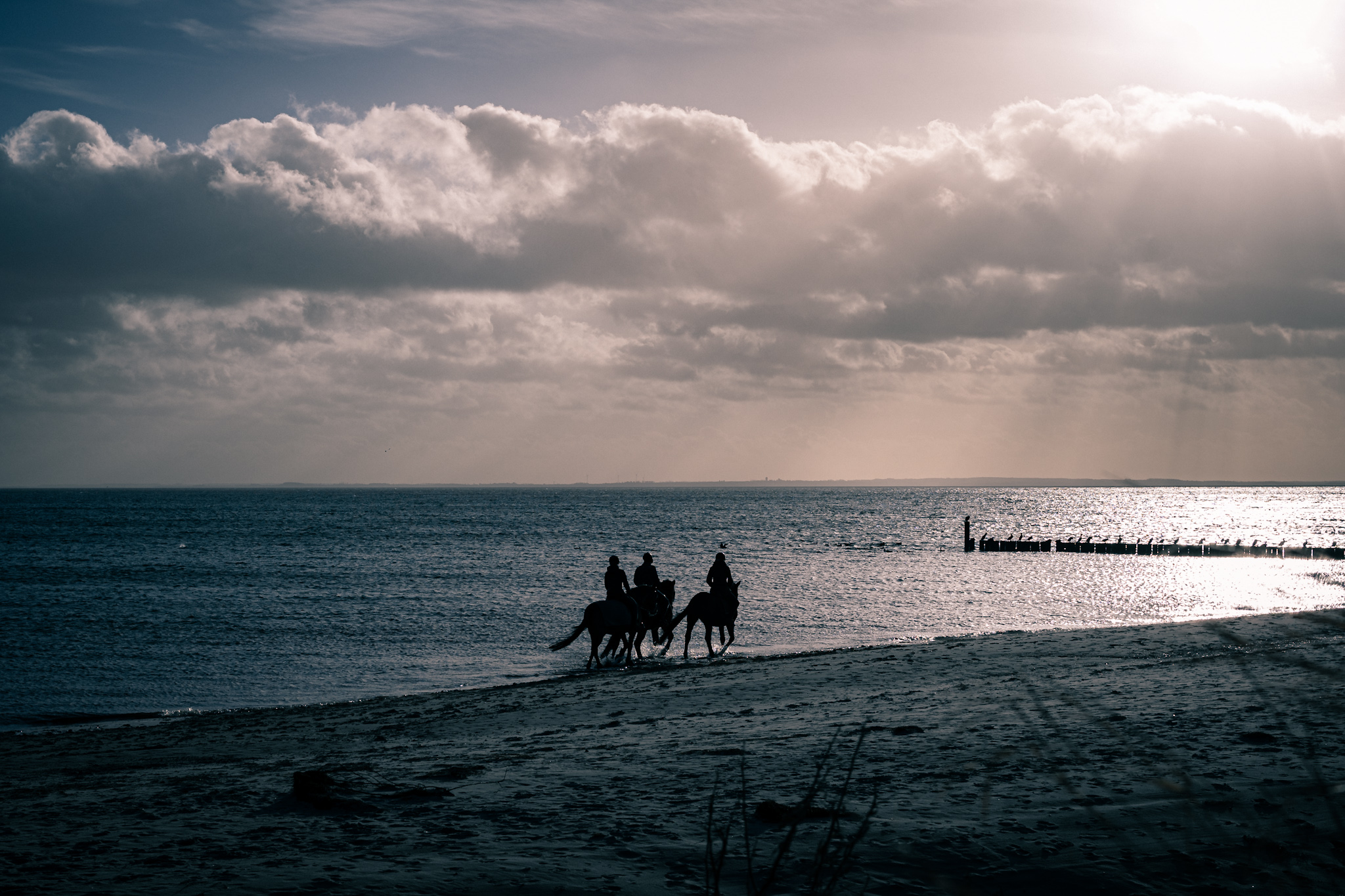
At f/6.3, (1.5×)

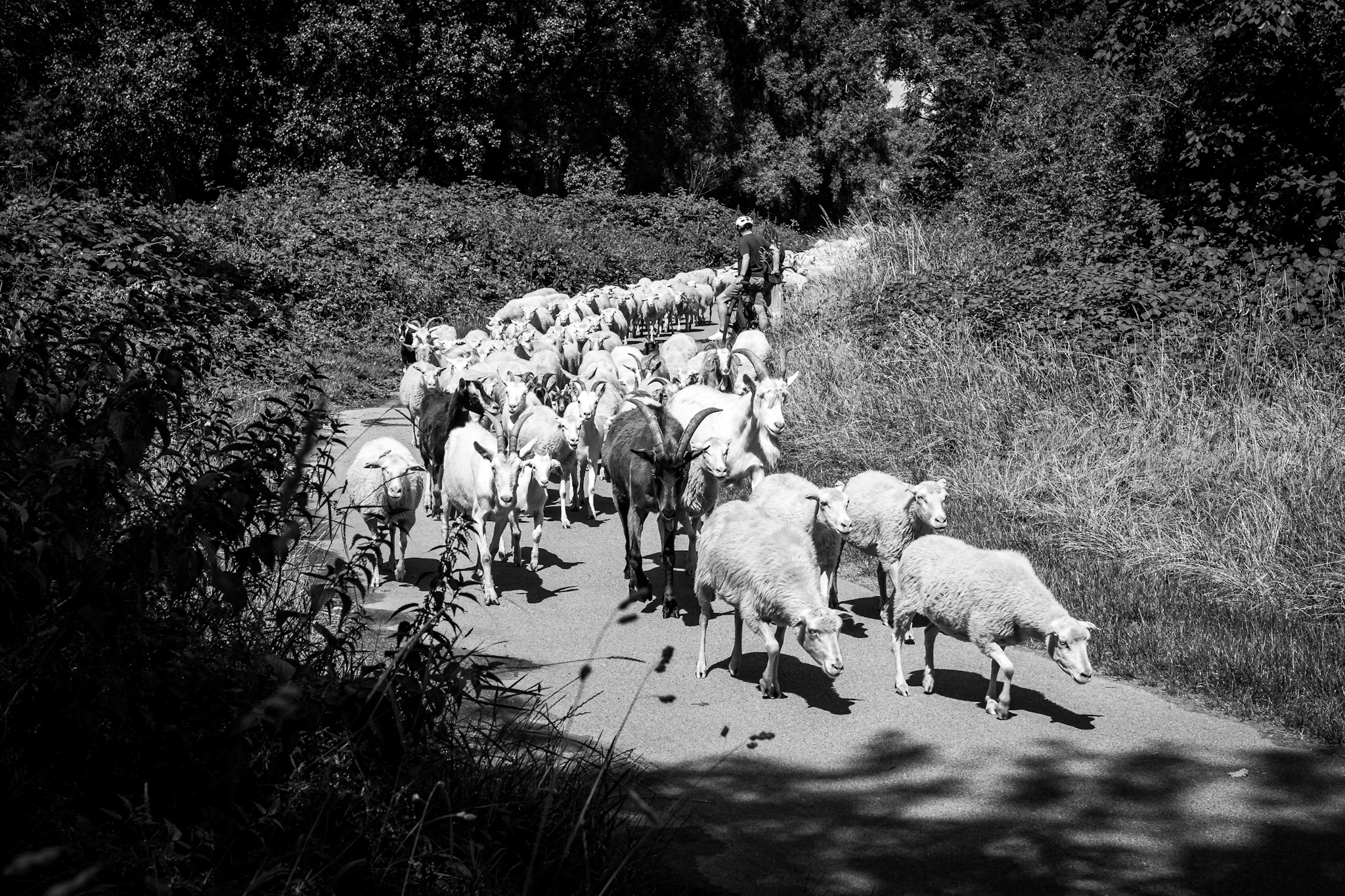
At f/7.1, (1.5×)

== See also ==
- Nikon Z-mount
