= ZWE =

ZWE may stand for:

- Zimbabwe, a country in Africa, ISO 3166-1 alpha-3 code ZWE
- Antwerpen-Centraal railway station, in Belgium, IATA code ZWE

== See also ==
- Zoe (disambiguation)
