= SZ =

SZ, Sz, sZ, or sz may refer to:

== Businesses and organizations ==
- Slovenske železnice (SŽ), a Slovenian railway company
- Green Party (Czech Republic) (Czech: Strana zelených)
- Air Southwest (IATA code)

== Places ==
- Salzgitter (vehicle registration code)
- Canton of Schwyz
- Shenzhen, simplify into SZ, a city in Guangdong province, China
- Eswatini (ISO 3166-1 country code)
  - .sz, the country code top level domain (ccTLD) for Eswatini
- Switzerland (NATO country code)

== Products ==
- Alfa Romeo SZ, a car
- Rolls-Royce SZ and Bentley SZ, a series of different cars produced from 1980 to 2003 by Rolls-Royce Motors and Bentley Motors
- SZ cycle-car, a Soviet/Russian microcar series including SZA and SZD
- SZ, a model from Sony's range of VAIO computers
- Sprite Zero, a diet soft drink

== Publications ==
- Saarbrücker Zeitung, a German newspaper, based in Saarland
- Süddeutsche Zeitung, a German newspaper, published in Munich
- Szőllősy index, catalogue (Sz) of all the compositions of Béla Bartók
- S/Z, an essay by Roland Barthes, published as a book in 1970

== Science and technology ==
- Shenzhou (spacecraft), the Chinese space capsule
- Sunyaev–Zel'dovich effect, in astrophysics
- Suzuki groups, a family of mathematical groups
- Suzuki sporadic group, a mathematical group

== Other uses ==
- Sz (digraph), a digraph used in Hungarian, Polish, Kashubian, German (as ẞ), and Cantonese romanization
- Sky Zone
- Sami Zayn, Canadian professional wrestler

== See also ==
- ß
- ZS (disambiguation)
