= Zinke =

Zinke is a German surname. Notable people with the surname include:

- Annelore Zinke (born 1958), German gymnast
- Charlotte Zinke (1891–1944), German politician
- Clara Louise Zinke (1909–1978), American tennis player
- Gustav Zinke (1891–1967), Czechoslovak rower
- Heiko Zinke, German sprint canoeist
- Olaf Zinke (born 1966), German speed skater
- Ryan Zinke (born 1961), American politician

== See also ==
- Zincke, a surname
- Zinc (disambiguation)
- Zink (disambiguation)
