= ZWS =

ZWS may refer to:

== Technology ==
- Zeus Web Server
- Zero-width space
- ZWS, the magic cookie for Adobe Flash format SWF

== Genetics ==
- PEX13, also called ZWS, the gene for encoding peroxisomal membrane protein 13
- PEX1, also known as ZWS, the gene encoding for peroxisome biogenesis factor 1

== Places ==
- Stuttgart Hauptbahnhof rail station (IATA geocode ZWS), Stuttgart, Baden-Württemberg, Germany
- Alsdorf rail station (station code ZWS), Alsdorf, Altenkirchen, Rhineland-Palatinate, Germany; see List of railway stations in Rhineland-Palatinate
- Zhongwei (geocode ZWS), Ningxia, China; see List of administrative divisions of Ningxia

== Groups, organizations ==
- Zero Waste Scotland (ZWS), see List of waste management acronyms
- Zurn Elkay Water Solutions Corporation (stock ticker: ZWS), see Companies listed on the New York Stock Exchange (Z)
- Zweckverband Personennahverkehr Westfalen Süd (ZWS), see List of German transport associations

== Other uses ==
- ZWS, the pseudonym for John Bacchus, as the director of the 2005 film Zombiez

== See also ==
- Shanshan Airport (ICAO airport code ZWSS), Shanshan, Xinjiang, China
- ZW (disambiguation), for the singular of ZWs
