= Zincke =

Zincke is a surname. Notable people with the surname include:

- Christian Friedrich Zincke, German painter
- Foster Barham Zincke (1817–1893), clergyman, traveler, and antiquary
- Georg Heinrich Zincke, German jurist and cameralist
- Theodor Zincke, German chemist

== See also ==
- Zinke, a surname
- Zinc (disambiguation)
- Zink (disambiguation)
