= Safiath =

- Safiath pictured circa 2022

Background information
- Born: Safia Aminami Issoufou Oumarou; 15 April 1982 (age 44); Khartoum, Sudan
- Genre: Rap
- Occupations: Singer, rapper, songwriter

Safia Aminami Issoufou Oumarou (born 15 April 1982), known professionally as Safiath, is a Nigerien singer, rapper, and songwriter.

== Early life and career beginnings ==
Safiath was born in Khartoum, and is ethnically Tuareg and Kanuri; she was born to a Sudanese mother and a Nigerien father. She went to Morocco to study economics and banking. In Rabat, she joined a group that performed salsa, in which she played guitar; she then returned to Niger, where she found it easier to gain work as a musician than using her degrees.

== Career ==
Safiath is the lead singer of the rap group Kaidan Gaskiya, but has sung a variety of other genres as well. She has represented Niger in numerous international musical competitions, including the 2013 Jeux de la Francophonie in Nice. Outside of Niger, Safiath has also collaborated with artists from other African nations during her performing career.

=== Musical style ===
Safiath has written songs in French, Hausa, Zarma and Tamasheq. They frequently deal with social issues, similar to those of Zara Moussa; children's rights in particular are a popular theme in her work, and she has spoken of a desire to raise consciousness in a younger generation with her songs.

She has articulated a desire for Nigeriens to engage more deeply with indigenous music, expressing concern over the increasing influence of foreign elements. She is concerned that French and American music specifically are affecting the quality of Nigerien rap.

== Personal life ==
As of 2013, Safiath is married to the rapper Phéno, with whom she has a child.
