= ZM =

ZM (and similar) may refer to:

- Zambia, a southern African country (ISO 3166-1: ZM)
  - .zm, Zambia's Internet top-level domain
- Zlaté Moravce, a town in Slovakia

== Arts and media ==
- ZM (radio station), a New Zealand broadcaster
- Zara Moussa, a Nigerian rapper

== Business ==
- Zoom Video Communications, an American developer of videotelephony software (Nasdaq ticker: ZM)

== Units of measure ==
- Zeptometre, an extremely small unit of length (10^{−21} m)
- Zeptomolar (zM), a unit of molar concentration
- Zettametre (Zm), an extremely large unit of length (10^{21} m)
