= ZS =

ZS, Zs, zS, or zs may refer to:

== Businesses and organizations ==
- Azzurra Air (IATA airline designator ZS)
- Zombie Squad, a disaster preparedness group
- ZS Associates, a consulting firm
- Zscaler, an American cloud security company that trades on the Nasdaq as ZS
- Greens of Serbia (Zeleni Srbije), a political party in Serbia
- Healthy Serbia (Zdrava Srbija), a political party in Serbia

== Places ==
- American Samoa (World Meteorological Organization country code ZS)
- Szczecin, a city in Poland identified by the vehicle registration code ZS

== Science and technology ==
- Zeptosecond, a unit of time equal to 10^{−21} seconds
- Zeptosiemens, an SI unit of electric conductance
- Zettasiemens, an SI unit of electric conductance
- Zettasecond, a unit of time equal to 10^{21} seconds
- Zs, the category for "Separator, Space" characters in the Unicode standard

== Other uses ==
- Zs (band), a musical group from Brooklyn, New York, United States
- Hungarian zs, the last (forty-fourth) letter of the Hungarian alphabet, following z
- MG ZS, a small family car
- MG ZS (crossover), a Chinese SUV
- South Africa (aircraft registration prefix ZS)

== See also ==
- SZ (disambiguation)
