= ZH =

ZH may refer to:

== Language ==
- Zh (digraph), in Albanian, Chinese pinyin and Uyghur
- Ž, in Latin script
- Zhe (Cyrillic) (Ж), a letter
- Ezh (ʒ), a letter
  - Voiced postalveolar fricative, a sound (IPA: /ʒ/)
- Chinese language (ISO 639-1:zh; endonym: Zhōngwén)
- Transliteration of the Tamil letter 'ழ'. This letter is also used since Sangam literature.

== Places ==
- Canton of Zürich, Switzerland
- South Holland (Dutch: Zuid-Holland), a province of the Netherlands
- Zhuhai, a prefectural city of China

== Other uses ==
- Shenzhen Airlines, China (IATA:ZH)
- Zero Hedge, a financial blog started in 2009
- Zettahenry (ZH), an SI unit of electrical inductance
