= ZIF =

ZIF, ZiF or Zif may refer to:

- Zero insertion force, a way to connect an electrical connector without applying force to the connector
- Zero Intermediate Frequency, a radio demodulation technique
- Zeolitic imidazolate frameworks, a class of metal-organic frameworks
- Zif, Hebron, a Palestinian village in the West Bank Governorate of Hebron
- Zif, Iran, a village in Kurdistan Province, Iran
- Zif Township, Wayne County, Illinois, United States
- ZiF, Center for Interdisciplinary Research, Bielefeld
