= ZC =

ZC, Zc, or zC may refer to:

- ZC, in set theory, a formal system with Zermelo's first five axioms plus the axiom of choice
- Zadoff–Chu sequence, in mathematics, a certain complex-valued sequence with the CAZAC property
- Zangger Committee, a committee on nuclear proliferation
- Zeptocoulomb, another SI unit of electric charge
- Zettacoulomb, an SI unit of electric charge
- Zimbabwe Cricket, the governing body for cricket in Zimbabwe
- Honda D engine, an engine variant produced by Honda Motor Company
- Zc(3900), a subatomic particle
