= Zoe (song) =

Single by Paganini Trax
- Released: 1997
- Recorded: 1997
- Genre: Breakbeat, tech house
- Producer(s): Paganini Traxx, Steve Everitt

Zoe is an instrumental by Italian electronic musician Paganini Traxx. It peaked at #47 on the UK Singles Chart.
