= ZT =

ZT may refer to:

== Arts and entertainment ==
- Zero Tolerance (video game), a 1994 first-person shooter
- Zero Two, in Darling in the Franxx, a 2018 monster anime series
- The Zimmer Twins, a Canadian animated series (2004–2007)
- Zoo Tycoon, simulation video games series
  - Zoo Tycoon (2001 video game), the initial 2001 game

== Science and technology ==
- Zeitgeber time, in somnology
- Zettatesla, an SI unit of magnetic flux density
- Zolpidem tartrate, a sleep medication
- zT, a thermoelectric figure of merit

== Transport ==
- MG ZT, an executive car model (made 2001–2005)
- Titan Airways, IATA code

== Other uses ==
- Zero tolerance, a non-discretionary rules-enforcement policy
- Zero Tolerance Knives, a knife brand of Kai USA

== See also ==
- Zero tolerance (disambiguation)
