= ZG =

ZG, Zg, or zg may refer to:

== Arts and entertainment ==
- Z-G, a 2001 collectible action figure game
- ZOEgirl, an American pop band
- Zubeen Garg (1972-2025), Indian singer and actor

== Places ==
- Zagreb, the capital of Croatia
- Zigong, Sichuan province, China
- Canton of Zug, Switzerland
- Zhōngguó (中国), the Chinese name for China.

== Units of mass ==
- Zeptogram (zg), 10^{−21} g
- Zettagram (Zg), 10^{21} g

== Transport and military ==
- Viva Macau, a defunct Chinese airline (2005–2010; former IATA:ZG)
- Zipair Tokyo, a Japanese airline (founded 2018; IATA:ZG)
- Defunct vehicle plate code for Pitkin County, Colorado, US
- Zerstörergeschwader, a German military unit equipped with twin-engined fighters such as Bf 110s
