= ZL =

ZL may refer to:

== Aviation ==
- Hazelton Airlines (1953–2001; IATA: ZL)
- Rex Airlines (founded 2002; IATA: ZL)
- ZL, an unused aircraft registration prefix for New Zealand

== Science, technology and mathematics ==
- ZL, ITU prefix for New Zealand, in radio and television
- Zorn's lemma, a proposition in set theory
- ZL, a Mazda Z5 engine variant

== Other uses ==
- Polish zloty (sign: zł), the currency of Poland
- z"l, a Jewish honorific for the dead
- ZL, a fictional assistant to superhero Masked Marvel (Centaur Publications)
