= Nikon Zf =

2023 full-frame mirrorless camera

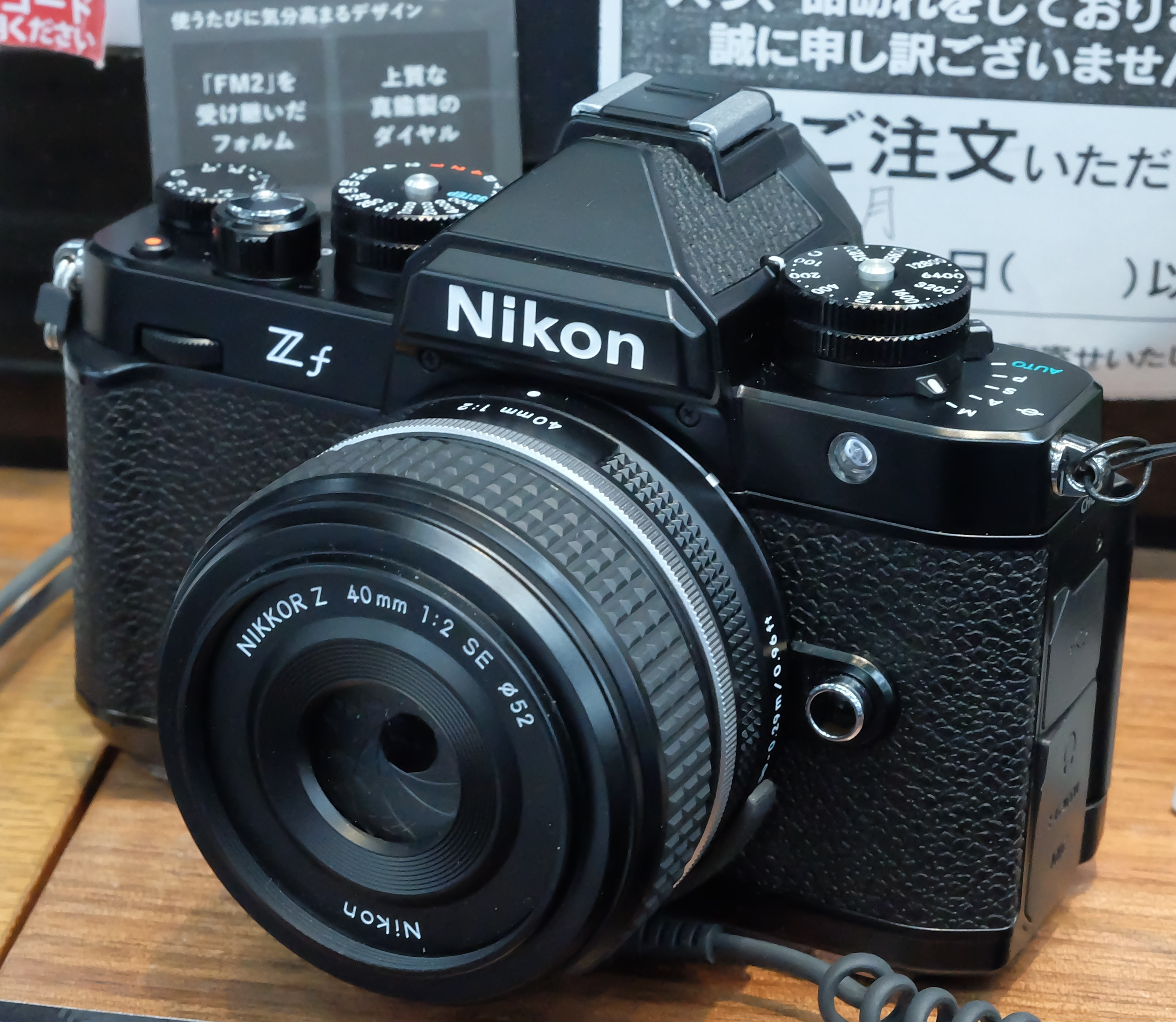
- Nikon Zf + NIKKOR Z 40mm f/2 SE

Overview
- Maker: Nikon
- Type: Full-frame mirrorless interchangeable-lens camera
- Released: 27 October 2023; 3 years ago

Lens
- Lens mount: Nikon Z-mount

Sensor/medium
- Sensor type: BSI-CMOS Sensor
- Sensor size: 35.9 mm × 23.9 mm Full Frame (Nikon FX format)
- Sensor maker: Sony Semiconductor Manufacturing Corporation
- Maximum resolution: 6,048 × 4,032 (24.5 effective megapixels)
- Film speed: ISO 100–64000 (standard); ISO 100–204800 (expandable)
- Recording medium: 1 × SD (UHS-II), 1 × microSD (UHS-I)

Focusing
- Focus: Hybrid AF
- Focus areas: 273 points

Exposure/metering
- Exposure: TTL exposure metering
- Exposure modes: Programmed Auto [P] with flexible program; Shutter-Priority Auto [S]; Aperture-Priority Auto [A]; Manual [M]
- Exposure metering: TTL exposure metering

Flash
- Flash: Built-in: No; Hot shoe

Shutter
- Shutter: Electronically controlled vertical-travel focal-plane mechanical shutter, Electronic front-curtain shutter, Electronic Shutter
- Shutter speeds: 30s – 1/8000s, Bulb, Time, X
- Continuous shooting: 7.8fps / 14fps (expand)

Viewfinder
- Viewfinder: 0.5 inch Quad-VGA OLED EVF (3,690,000 'dots')

Image processing
- Image processor: EXPEED 7

General
- Video recording: 4K UHD at 30p/25p/24p, Full HD at 120p/100p/60p/50p/30p/25p/24p
- LCD screen: 3.2-inch variangle TFT LCD with touchscreen, 2.10 million dots
- Battery: EN-EL15c (EN-EL15b/a usable with reduced battery life); USB-PD rechargeable
- Optional accessories: MC-N10 remote grip
- AV port(s): USB Type-C, HDMI Type-D, Stereo mini jack (3.5mm) for headphone and mic out
- Data port(s): IEEE 802.11b/g/n/a/ac/Wi-Fi, Bluetooth 5.0
- Body features: In-Body Image Stabilization
- Dimensions: 144×103×49 mm (5.7×4.1×1.9 in)
- Weight: 630 g (22 oz) (body only); 710g (includes battery)
- Latest firmware: 3.01 / 31 March 2026; 7 months ago
- Made in: Thailand

Chronology
- Predecessor: Nikon Df; Nikon Z6II; Nikon Zfc

The Nikon Zf is a mirrorless interchangeable-lens camera with the Nikon Z-mount with a list price of $1999 body only, in the US. It is the eleventh Z-mount camera body and the eighth full-frame Z-mount body.

== History ==
The camera was announced on 20 September 2023 and was shipped out to customers in Japan on 27 October 2023 (others unknown). On 25 September 2023, Nikon announced that the Zf is expected for delayed delivery for some customers due to unexpected order volume.

The Zf was initially available in black, moss green, stone gray, and sepia brown. On 4 September 2025, Nikon announced a silver edition of the Zf, which also offers the same “Premium Exterior” color options as the black, initially released body. Besides the existing color options, Nikon also announced three new variants for both bodies (Cognac Brown with an embossed texture, Teal Blue, and Mauve Pink).

== Lenses ==
The Zf uses the Nikon Z-mount, developed by Nikon for its mirrorless digital cameras.

Nikon F-mount lenses can be used, with various degrees of compatibility, via the Nikon FTZ (F-to-Z) and FTZ II mount adapters.

== Features ==
Nikon Zf logo

The Zf is a full-frame camera believed to use the same 24.5MP BSI-CMOS sensor used in the Nikon Z6II, as its official specifications are the same. It has a 273-point phase-detection autofocus system and can shoot up to 10 frames per second in normal mode, and 14 frames per second in expanded mode.

Although it closely resembles the Nikon Zfc, which was also based on the design of Nikon's classic FM2 and FE2 with almost the same internals of Nikon Z50, there are number of upgrades on the Zf, even in comparison to the Z6II on which the camera internals are based.

The camera is a spiritual successor to the Nikon Df and Nikon Zfc digital cameras. Those cameras, like the Zf, housed modern image sensors in retro-styled camera bodies designed to resemble the early models in the Nikon F series of film cameras.

This includes eight stops of Internal Body Image Stabilization (IBIS), of which only the Sony α7R V was capable at the time of the Zf's release, and the world's first Focus-point Stabilization technology in which the IBIS axes shift and rotate around the user selected autofocus point rather than in the middle like the conventional IBIS.

Nikon's Focus-point Stabilization technology allows for sharper stabilized image at the focused point, whereas the conventional IBIS cannot compensate for the blurs that are further away from the center of the sensor.

The Zf also is the first camera in the Nikon range that allows for Pixel Shift Shooting, which can produce up to 96 Megapixel image by taking multiple shots (32 for 96 Megapixels) in quick succession while the sensor is shifted pixel by pixel. The taken shots are then processed in Nikon's NX Studio to form a single large megapixel picture. The overall process is the same as Fujifilm's Pixel Shift Multi-Shot and Sony's Pixel Shift Multi Shooting function.

The Zf supports pre-release capture.

The body, top plate and bottom plate of the camera are made from magnesium alloy and plastics are used in some areas. Major difference with the Zfc is that brass is used for the top dials instead of aluminum. The kit lens for the Zf includes a Nikkor Z 40mm ƒ/2 (Special Edition) designed to match the body.

The camera is Nikon's first to implement a dual SD/Micro-SD memory card setup. The image processor has also been upgrade to Expeed 7, and the camera's autofocus is on par with those of Nikon Z8 and Z9.

The camera was Nikon's first camera with a film grain simulation feature, added via firmware update. It was the only Nikon camera with film grain simulation, until the Nikon Z5IIC launch.

== Gallery ==
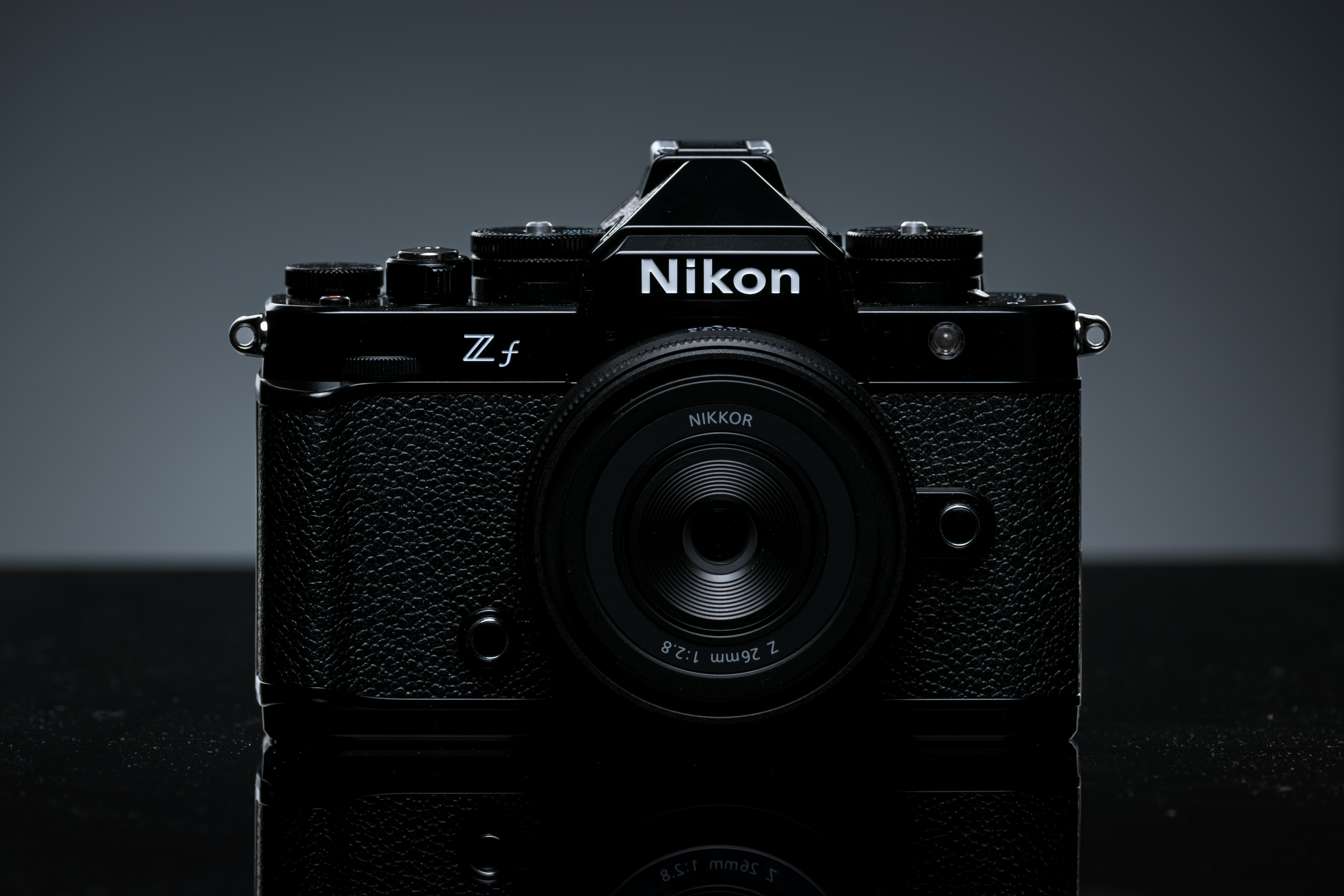
Black Zf + Nikkor Z 26 mm f/2.8

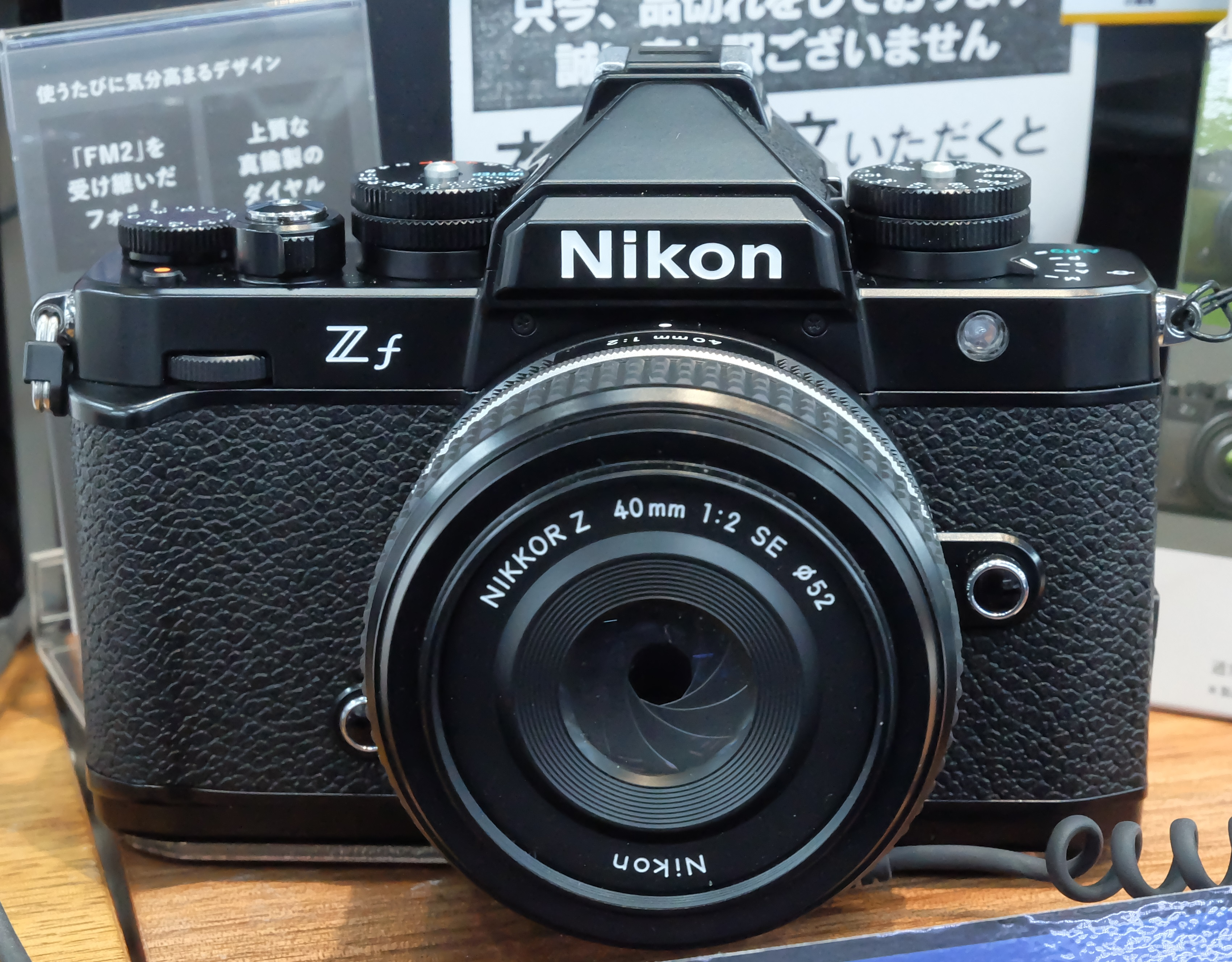
Black Zf + Nikkor Z 40 mm f/2 SE

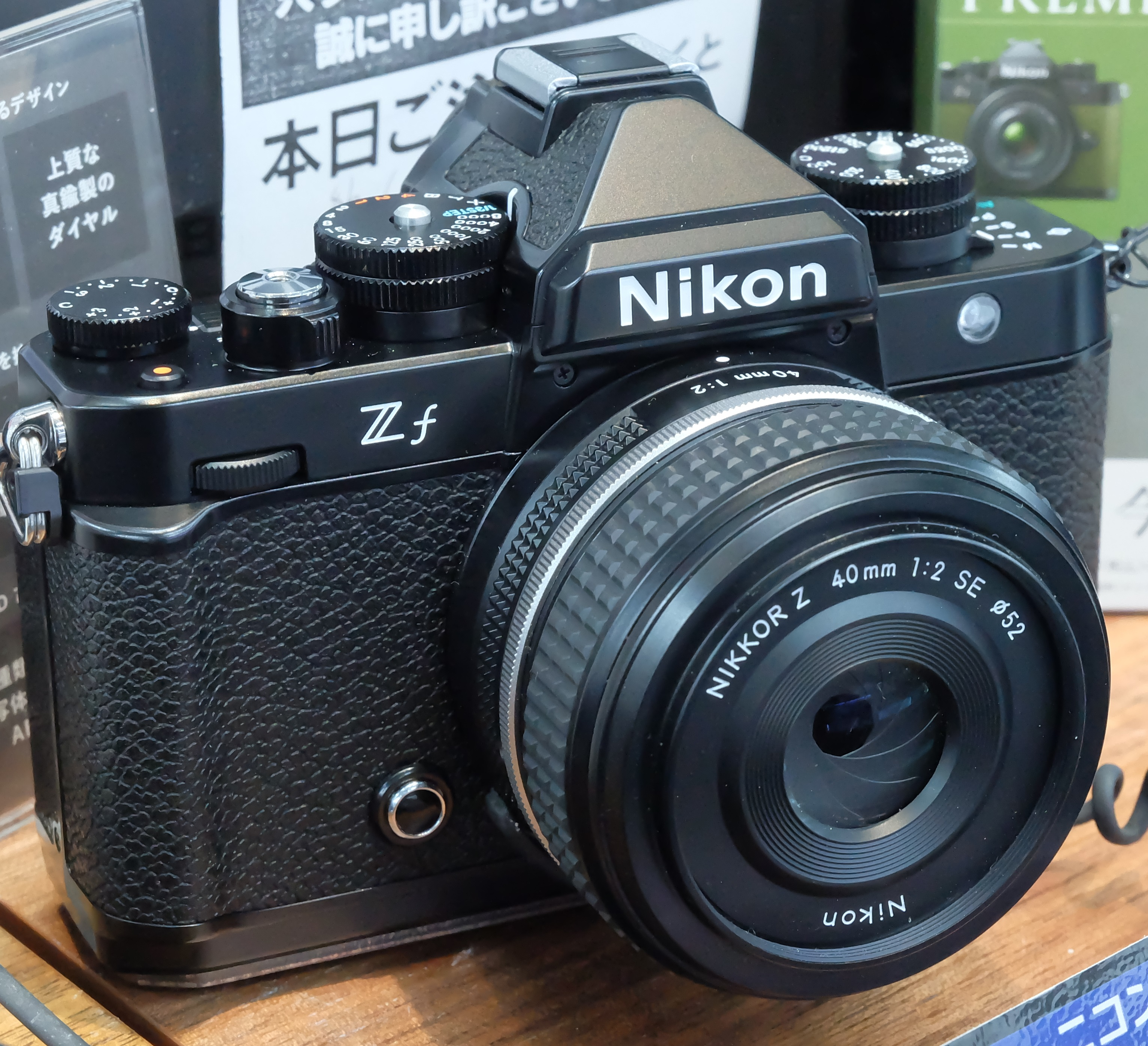

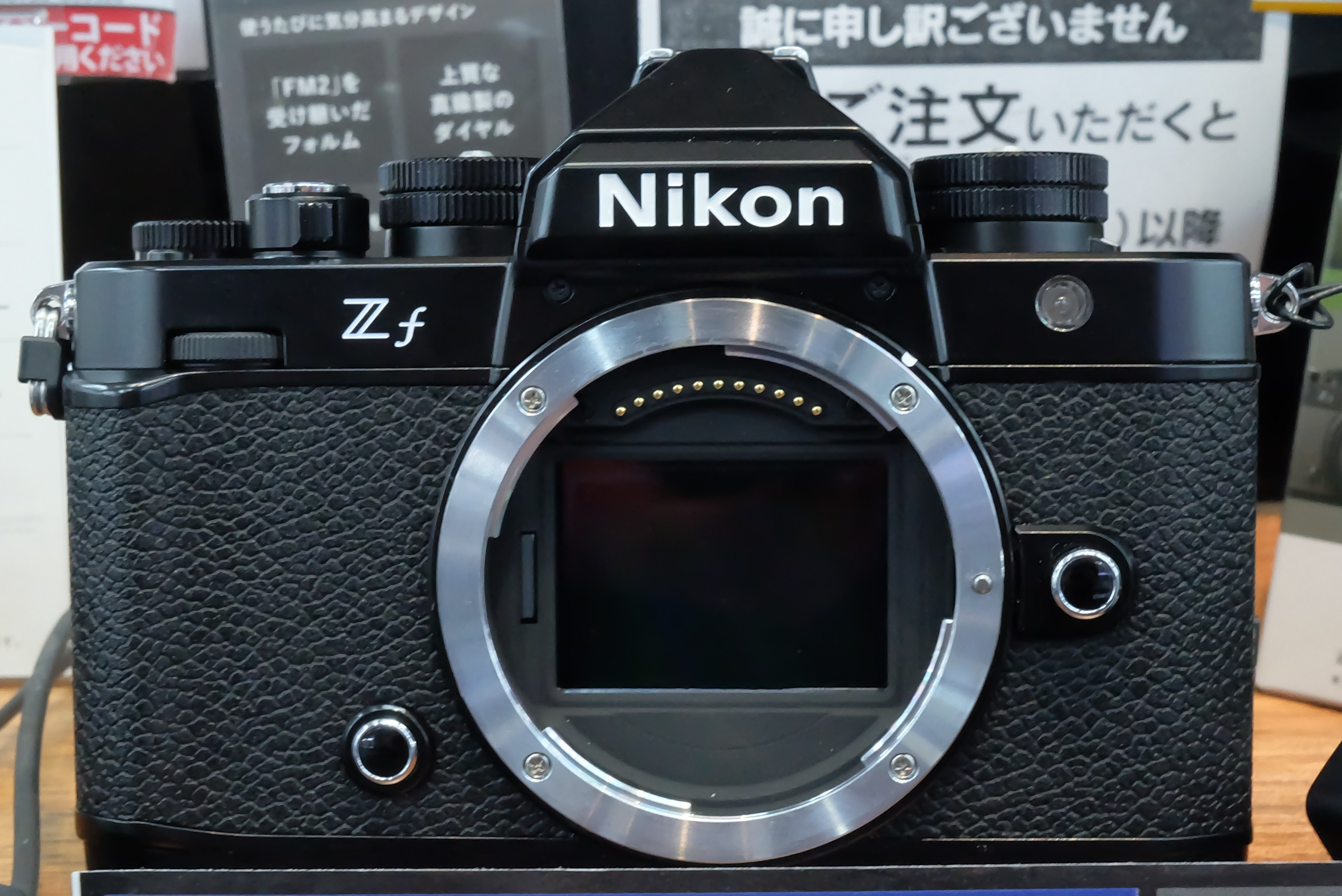

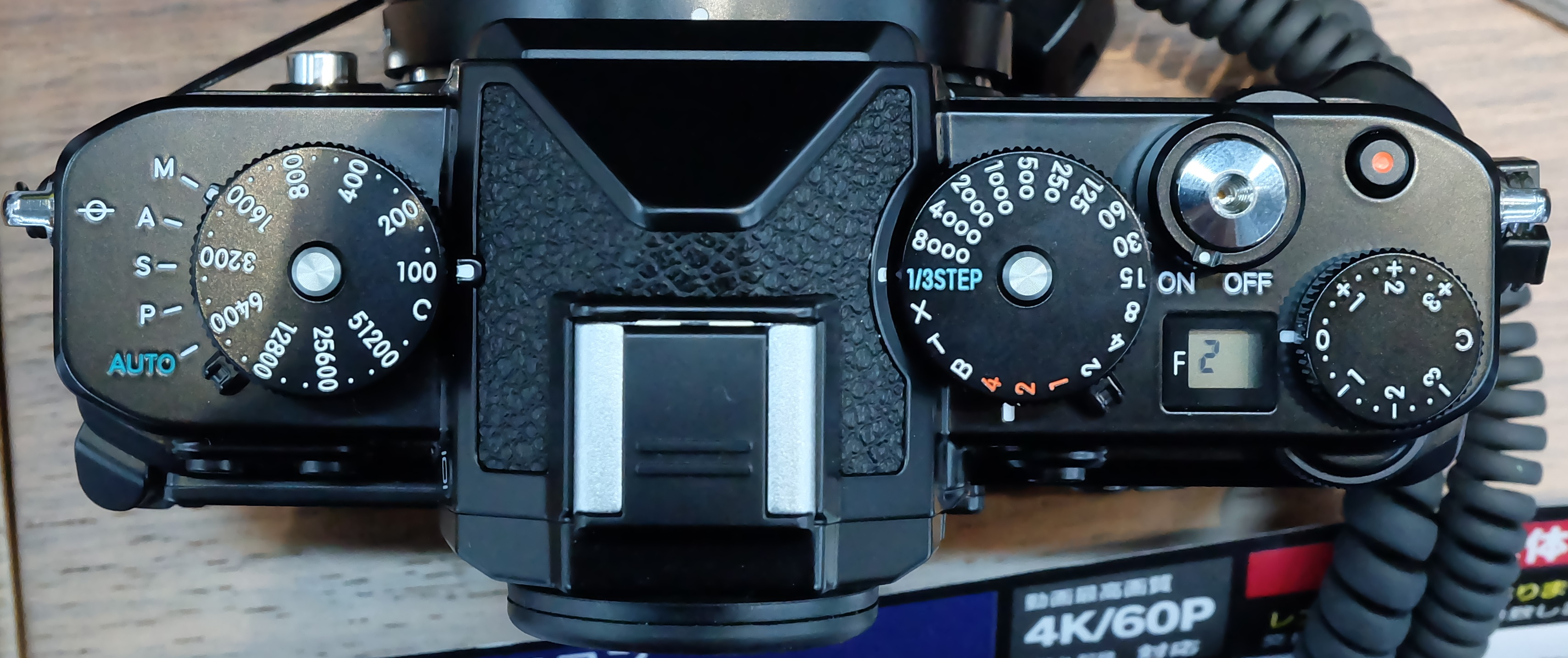

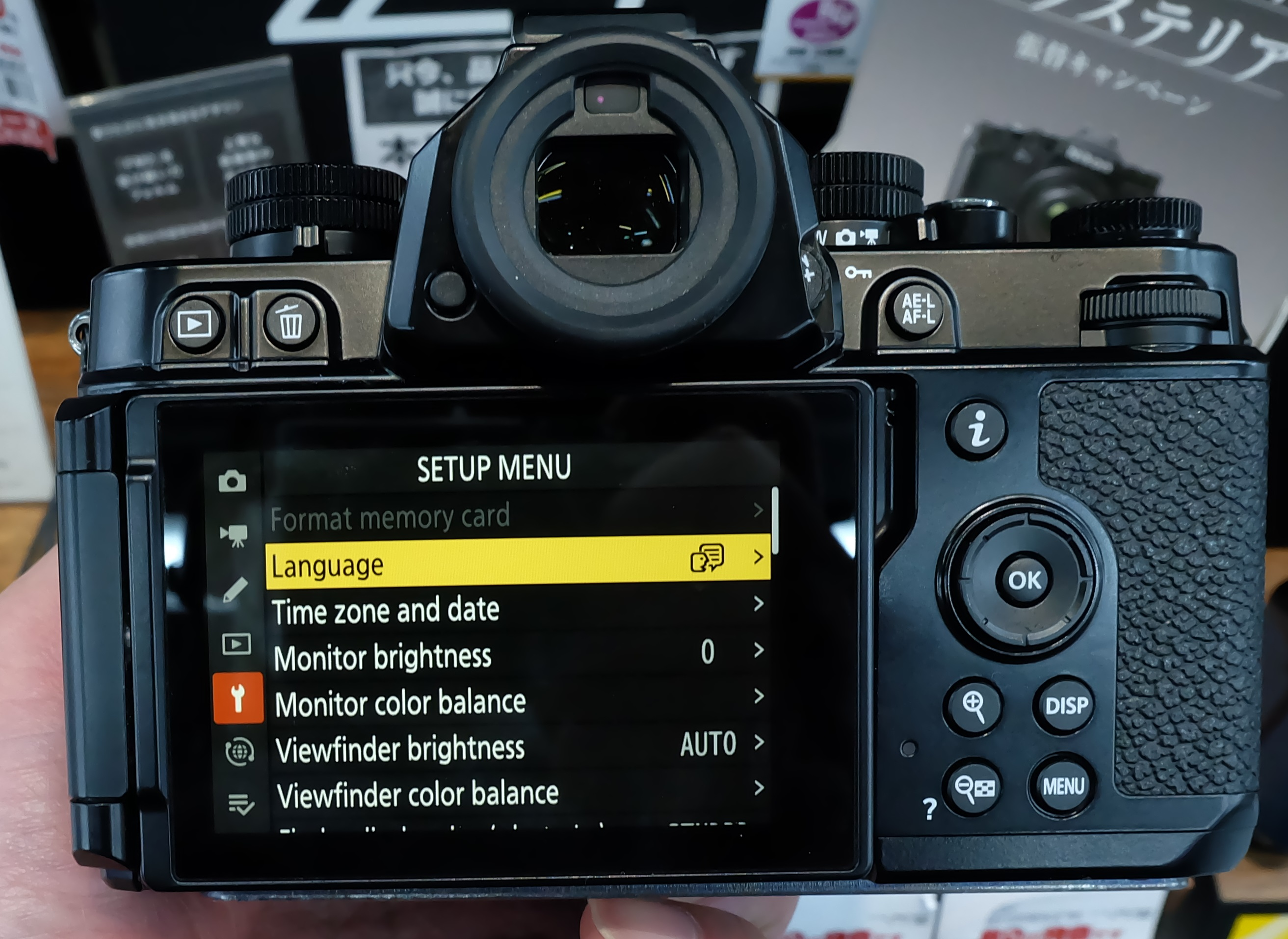

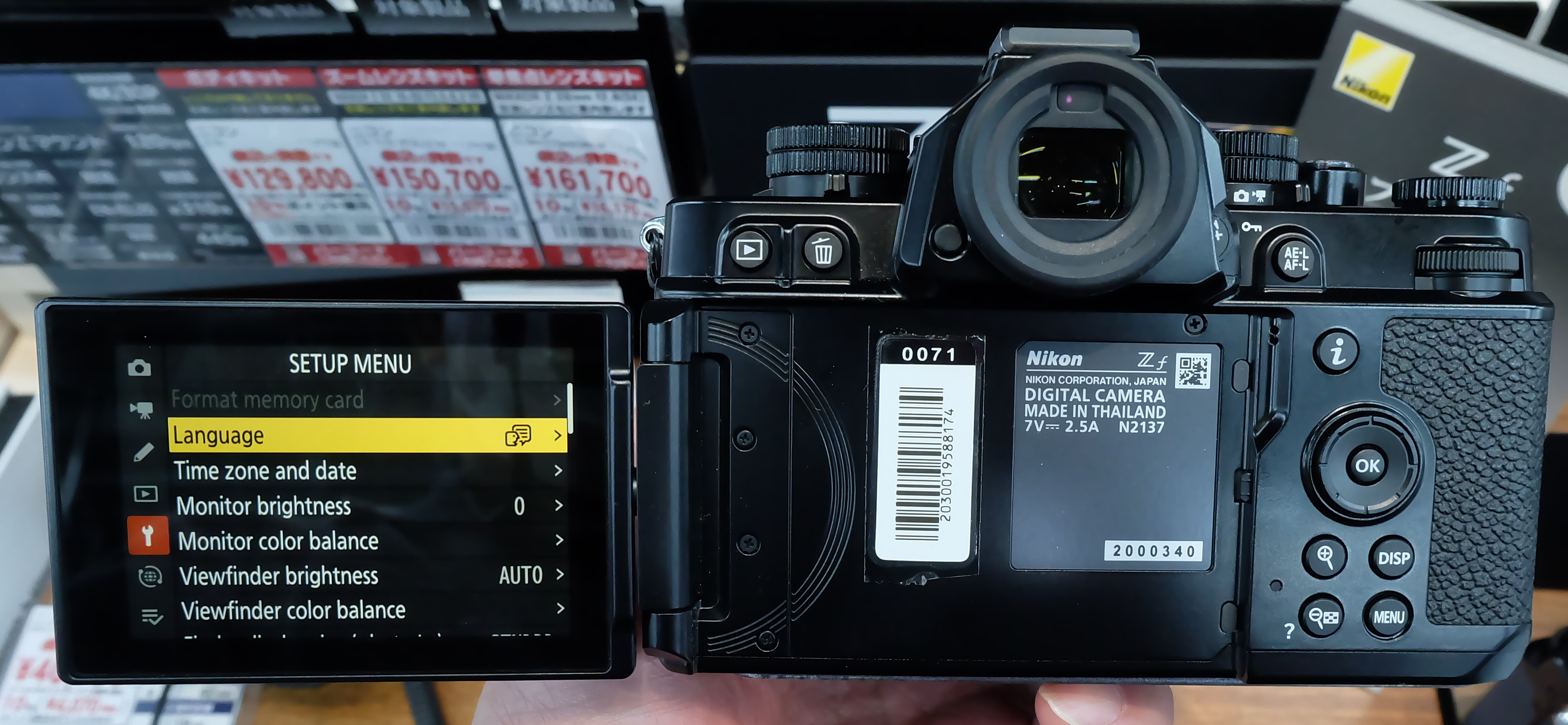

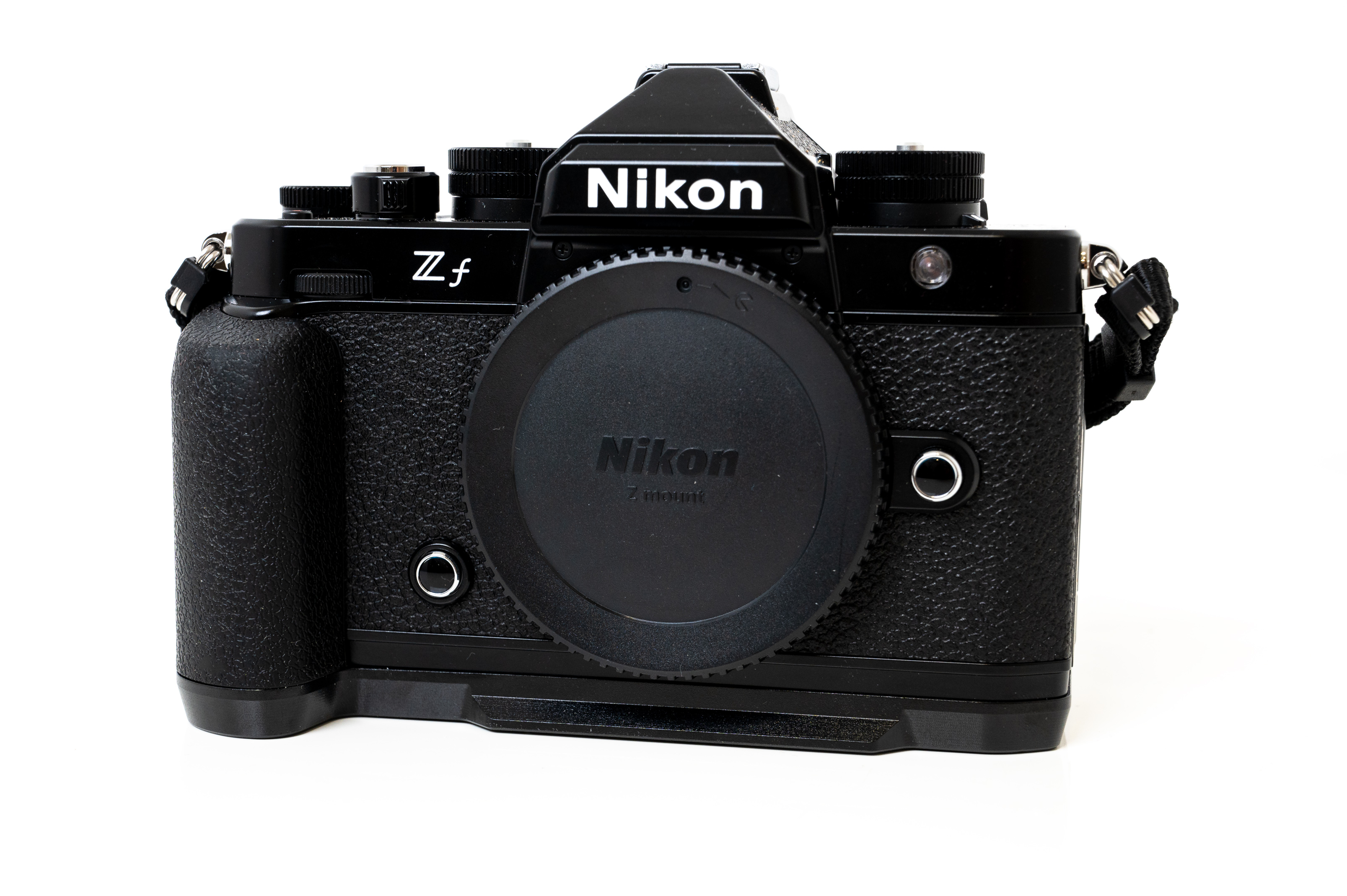
Black Zf with a SmallRig grip ("L-Shape Handle") attached

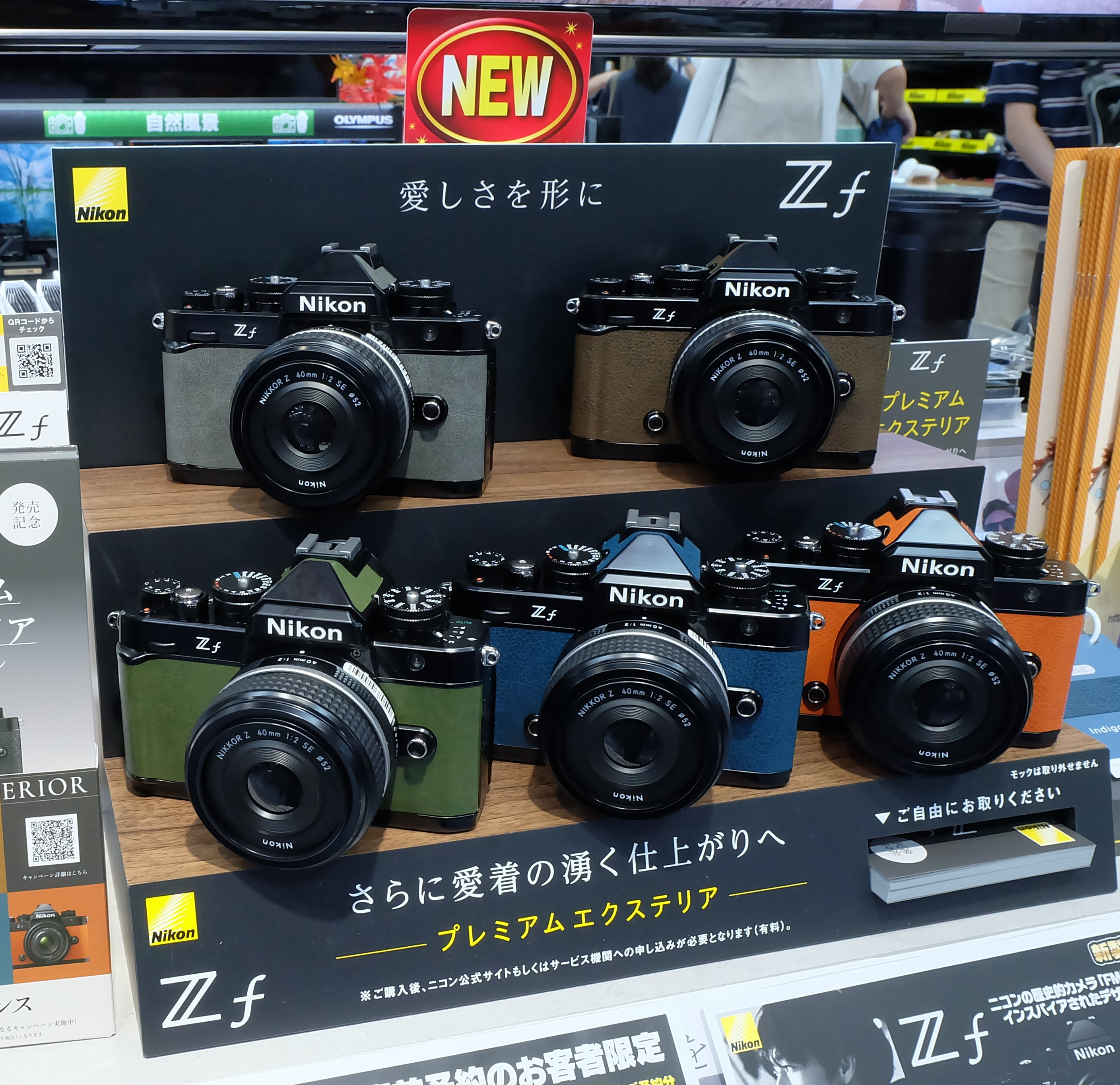
Black Zf in various colors (top fltr: Stone Grey, Sepia Brown; bottom: Moss Green, Indigo Blue, Sunset Orange)

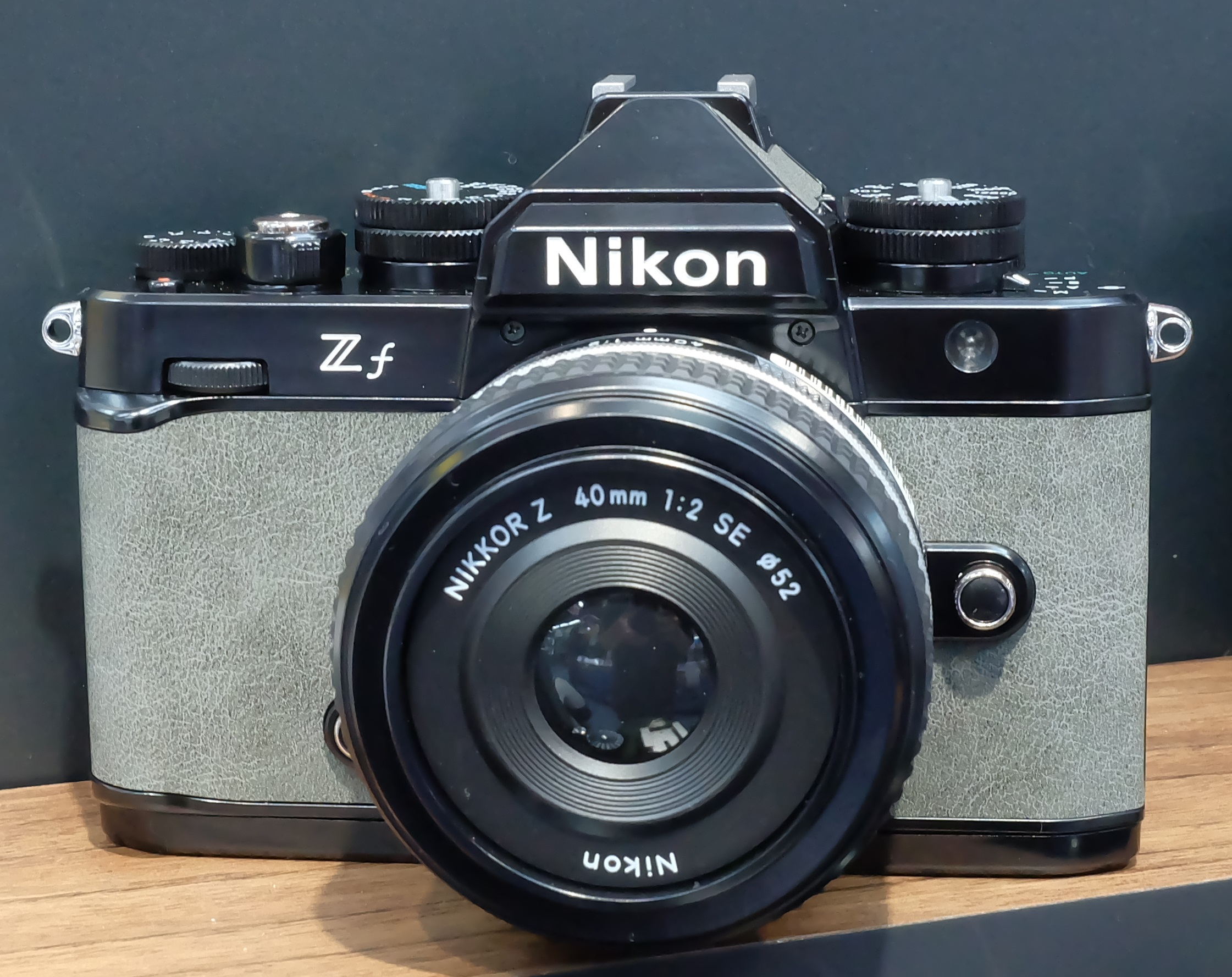
Black Zf Stone Grey + Z 40 mm f/2 SE

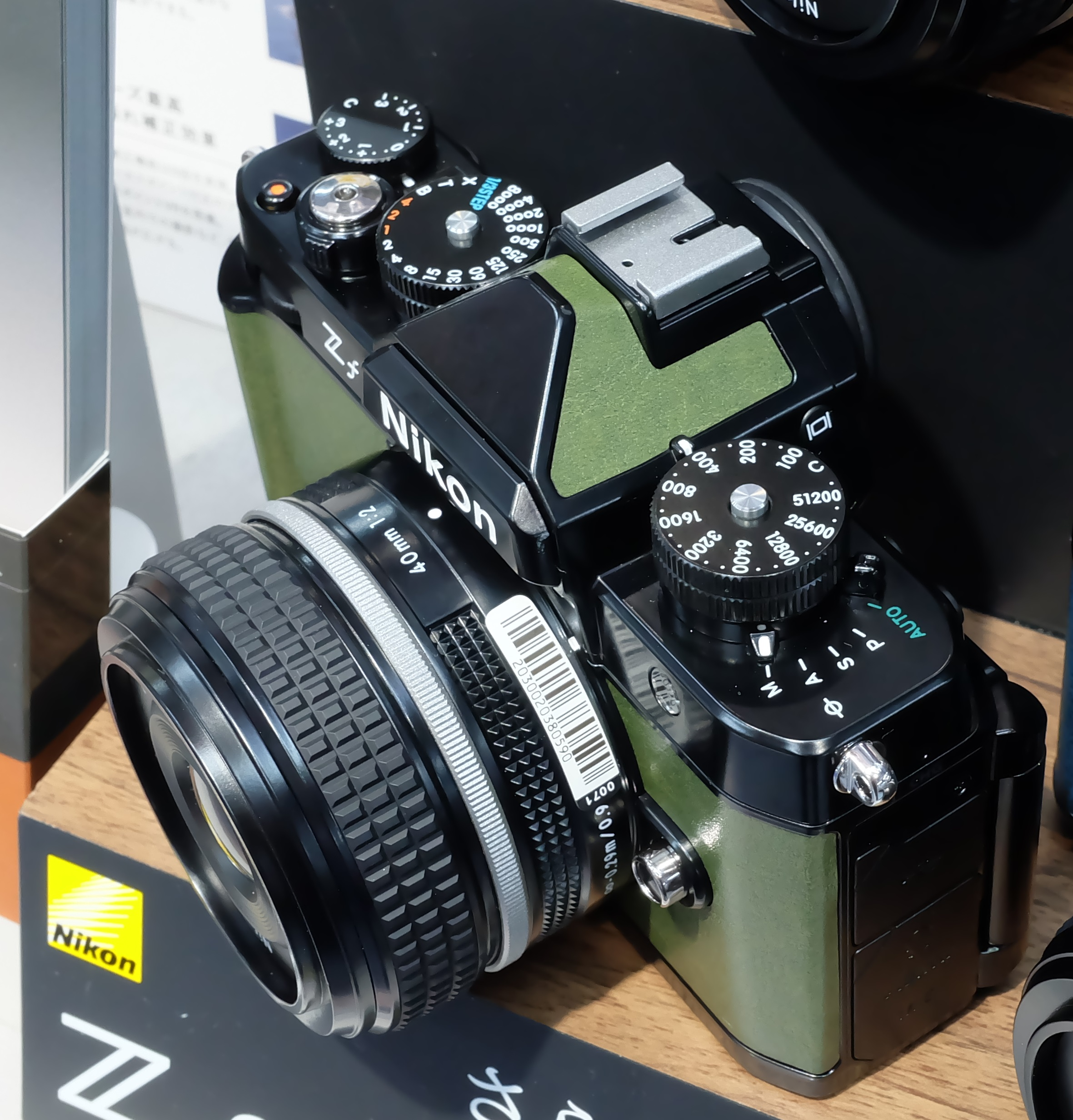
Black Zf Moss Green + Z 40 mm f/2 SE

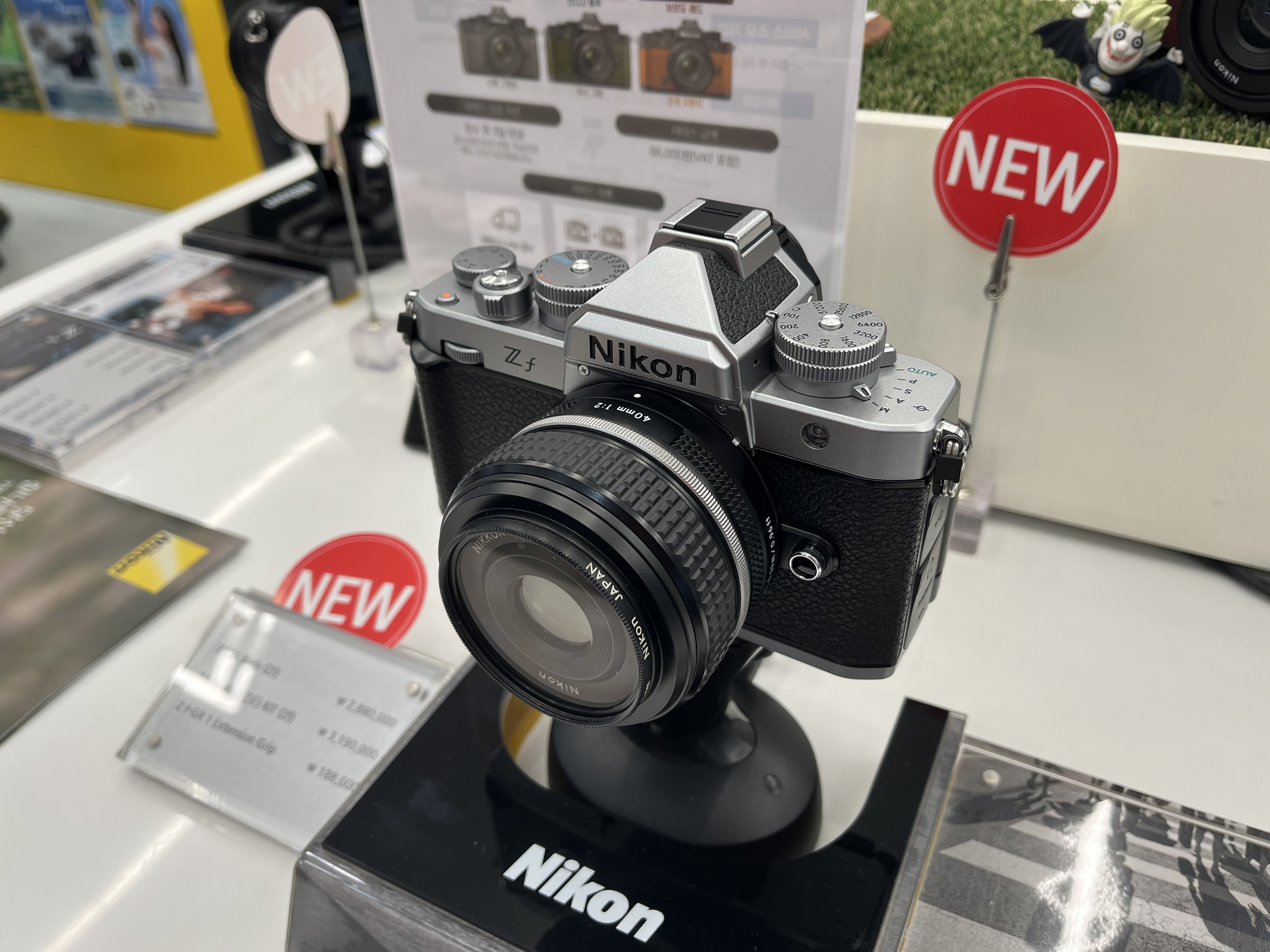
Silver Zf + Z 40 mm f/2 SE

== Awards ==
The camera was awarded with:

- the Red Dot Design Award 2024,
- the iF Design Award 2024 (along with two Nikkor Z SE lenses (Nikkor Z 28 mm f/2.8 SE and Nikkor Z 40 mm f/2 SE))
- the Japan Institute of Design Promotion 2023 Good Design Award.

== Update history ==
Version	Release date	Notes
1.0	2023-09-20	Initial firmware version
1.10	2023-11-16	Added slow-motion video recording; Fixed issue with viewfinder live view display
1.20	2024-04-29	Fixed issue with color temperature consistency in consecutive shots in pixel-shift mode; Fixed various issues where the camera would stop responding; Changed default values for wireless connection
1.21	2024-11-12	Fixed issue that sometimes caused overexposure in the viewfinder and monitor displays
2.00	2025-04-08	Added bird subject detection autofocus; Added Nikon Imaging Cloud; Added "Hi-Res Zoom" function for video (zoom without loss of resolution/quality when shooting 1080p video, using a 1080p region of the whole 4K sensor); Added various options and functions for power zoom lenses (as of March 2025, available with Nikkor Z 28-135 mm f/4 PZ lens); Separate settings are now available for Auto ISO in the photo shooting menu when the ISO sensitivity dial is set to C or to a value of 100 to 64000; Option to exit magnified view with half-pressing the shutter-release button; Added 200% and 400% maximum magnification in live view display; Exposure compensation and ISO sensitivity can now be assigned to the main or sub-command dial in manual shooting mode; Added manual input of aperture values when using non-CPU lenses; Added focus distance value on indicator during manual focus; Various options, changes and improvements for still- and video shooting; Bug fixes
2.01	2025-05-20	Fixed an issue that would cause the camera to stop responding when using cloud/custom Picture Controls and Multiple exposure mode in conjunction
2.02	2025-06-24	Guidance text for connecting to Nikon Imaging Cloud was updated
3.00	2025-10-28	Film grain options for photos and video; Camera orientation metadata saving for video; Option to ignore aperture setting and keep aperture open wide while composing shots; Focus limiting options; Command dials can now be set to control exposure compensation and ISO sensitivity; EVF/rear screen autoswitch can now be disabled while rear screen is open; Electronic shutter sound for burst shooting or pixel shift shooting can now be enabled and adjusted; Focus peaking can be restricted to zoomed-in view; 4:3 framing grid; 9:16 framing grid; Can now be used as USB webcam (UVC/UAC) without separate drivers/software; STA Wi-Fi connection mode; Various options, changes and improvements for still- and video shooting; Bug fixes
3.01	2026-03-31	when the standby timer expired, changed way the aperture is adjusted; Bug fix; in 2 Prioritize viewfinder monitor modes, fixed i-menu sometimes not being available

== Marketing slogans ==
When the Zf was launched, Nikon used the following marketing slogans:

- English: “Make Iconic.”(Black), English: “Just Iconic.”(Silver).
- Japanese: "愛しさを形に" ("Forming affection")

== See also ==
- Nikon Df
- Nikon Zfc
- List of retro-style digital cameras

Sensor	Class	2018	2019	2020	2021	2022	2023	2024	2025	2026
FX (Full-frame)	Flagship					^{8K} Z9 ^{S}				
FX (Full-frame)	Flagship							^{8K} Z8 ^{S}		
FX (Full-frame)	Professional		^{4K} Z7 ^{S}		^{4K} Z7Ⅱ ^{S}					
FX (Full-frame)	Professional		^{4K} Z6 ^{S}		^{4K} Z6Ⅱ ^{S}				^{6K} Z6Ⅲ ^{S}	
FX (Full-frame)	Cinema									^{6K} ZR ^{S}
FX (Full-frame)	Enthusiast							^{4K} Zf ^{S}		
FX (Full-frame)	Enthusiast				^{4K} Z5 ^{S}					^{4K} Z5Ⅱ ^{S}
FX (Full-frame)	Entry-level									^{4K} Z5ⅡC ^{S}
DX (APS-C)	Enthusiast					^{4K} Zfc				
DX (APS-C)	Prosumer			^{4K} Z50					^{4K} Z50Ⅱ	
DX (APS-C)	Entry-level						^{4K} Z30			
Sensor	Class									
Sensor	Class	2018	2019	2020	2021	2022	2023	2024	2025	2026
