= Zi =

Zi or ZI may refer to:

== Arts and entertainment ==
- Zi (album), a 2016 album by Negură Bunget
- Zi (film), a 2026 film by Kogonada
- Zi (Zoids), a fictional planet in the Zoids franchise

== Language ==
- Zi (cuneiform), a sign
- Chinese characters, known as zi (字)
- Thracian word derived from *Dyēus

== People ==
- Zi (surname) (子), a surname used by Shang kings
- Zi (title) (子), a Chinese honorific used for ancient viscounts and for master philosophers
- Zi (name) (字), an alternate term for East Asian courtesy names

== Science, technology and transport ==
- Zi Corporation, a Canadian software company
- Zi (prefix symbol), for digital data size
- Zona incerta, a brain region
- Aigle Azur French airline (1946–1955; IATA:ZI)
- Zī (觜) or Turtle Beak, a Chinese constellation
