= ZV =

ZV or zv may refer to:

- V Air (IATA airline code ZV)
- Air Midwest (former IATA airline code ZV)
- Zettavolt, an SI unit of voltage
- Zoomed video port, a unidirectional video bus allowing laptops to display real-time vide
- Zivilverteidigung der DDR, German for the Civil defense of the GDR
