= ZJ =

ZJ or zJ may refer to:

== Places ==
- Zhejiang, a province of China

== Science and mathematics ==
- Zeptojoule (zJ), a small SI unit of energy
- Zettajoule (ZJ), a large SI unit of energy
- ZJ theorem, 1968, in group theory

== Transport ==
- Jeep Grand Cherokee (ZJ), 1993 models of the sports utility vehicle
- Zambezi Airlines (2008–2012; IATA:ZJ)
