= ZMB =

ZMB may refer to:

- The Berlin Zoological Museum, which changed its name to Museum für Naturkunde ('Natural History Museum') in 1889;
- The Zürcher Museums-Bahn, a heritage railway in the Swiss city of Zurich;
- ZMB, a country code of Zambia;
- ZMB GmbH (Securing Energy for Europe), a former subsidiary of Gazprom.
