= ZA =

Za or ZA may refer to:

== Business ==
- Za (guilds), former Japanese feudal trade guilds; also a Japanese term (座), usually meaning "seat" or "platform"
- ZoneAlarm, an internet security software company
- ZA, IATA airline code for Interavia Airlines
- Zest Airways, a defunct airline in the Philippines

== Country codes ==
- ZA (from Dutch Zuid-Afrika), ISO 3166 country code for South Africa
- ZA, FIPS 10-4 country code for Zambia

== Language ==
- Za (Armenian letter) (Զ զ), the sixth letter of the Armenian alphabet
- Za (cuneiform), a sign of the ancient Near Eastern cuneiform script
- Ẓāʼ (ظ), the penultimate and rarest modern Arabic letter
- Zhuang languages, spoken in southern China (ISO 639-1: za)

== Science and technology ==
- .za, South Africa's Internet top-level domain
- Zeptoampere (zA), SI unit of electric current, equal to 10^{−21} amperes
- Zettampere (ZA), SI unit of electric current, equal to 10^{21} amperes
- Zinc aluminium (ZA), a family of metal alloys

== Other uses ==
- "Za", a song by Supergrass from their 2002 album Life on Other Planets
- Za, American slang for pizza
- Za (plant), the common name in Malagasy for Adansonia za
- Pokémon Legends: Z-A, an entry in the Pokémon video game series
- Za, or "zaza", a slang term for cannabis (marijuana and hashish)

== See also ==
- Za Za Za, album by Grupo Climax
- Za-Za album by BulletBoys
