= ZW =

ZW or zw may refer to:

== Science ==
- ZW sex-determination system, chromosomal in birds and some species of reptile, fish, and insect
  - ZW, heterogametic genetic female designation under this system
- Zettawatt (ZW), an SI unit of power, 10^{+21} watts
- Zeptowatt (zW), an SI unit of power, 10^{−21} watts
- Zwicky Catalogue (abbreviated: Zw), the "Catalogue of Galaxies and of Clusters of Galaxies"

== Groups, organizations ==
- Air Wisconsin (IATA airline designator: ZW), a US airline
- Zulte-Waregem, Belgian association football club
- Military Gendarmerie (Poland) (ŻW; Polish: Żandarmeria Wojskowa), Polish military police

== Other uses ==
- Zimbabwe (ISO 3166-1 alpha-2 country code ZW), a country in Africa
  - .zw, the country code top level domain (ccTLD) for Zimbabwe
  - Zimbabwean dollar (ZW$)

== See also ==
- ZVV
- WZ (disambiguation)
- ZWS (disambiguation)
