= ZBT =

ZBT may refer to:

- ZBT Appendix, bilateral master contract for trading natural gas on the Zeebrugge Hub
- Zero Bus Turnaround memory
- Zeta Beta Tau
- Zimmerberg Base Tunnel
