= Zha =

Zha or ZHA may refer to:

- Zha (surname) (查), a Chinese surname
- Zhanjiang Wuchuan Airport, IATA code ZHA
- Zhuang languages, ISO 639 code zha
- Zimperium Handset Alliance, an association of device vendors and carriers exchanging security-related Android information
- ZHA Architects (until 2026, Zaha Hadid Architects), an international architecture and design firm founded by Zaha Hadid.

== See also ==
- CHA (disambiguation)
