= Zara Moussa =

Nigerien singer and rapper

- Also known as: ZM
- Born: 1980 (age 45–46)
- Origin: Niamey, Niger
- Genre: Hip hop
- Occupations: Singer, rapper

Zara Moussa (born c. 1980) is a Nigerien singer and rapper, performing under the name ZM.

A native of Niamey, Moussa first came to public notice in 2002 when she won a hip-hop contest in her home city which had been organized by the French embassy. Subsequently she became the first female rapper from West Africa to sign a record deal. The resulting album was titled Kirari, from a Hausa word used to call people to battle. Her songs address social and political issues such as women's rights, domestic abuse, and matters of importance to public health; in this regard she is similar to other Nigerien rappers, such as Safiath. Many are performed in the French language, but some are in Zarma and some in Hausa. Her style blends hip-hop and other African influences. Moussa is married, and describes her husband, who has written some of her songs and assists in producing her recordings, as her biggest support in a country where music is often not seen as a worthwhile investment, and whose hip-hop scene is dominated by men. She has appeared at WOMEX as well.
