= ZAF =

ZAF may refer to:

- Zinc Application Framework
- Zambian Air Force
- South Africa by ISO 3166-1 alpha-3 code
- Zhengzhou East railway station, China Railway telegraph code ZAF

Zaf may refer to:

- Zaf, Iran
