= ZK =

ZK may refer to:

== Arts and entertainment ==
- ZK (rapper) (born 2000), Danish musician
- Zero-K, a 2010 real-time strategy game
- ZK, alleged publisher of Sad Satan, a 2015 horror game
- ZK, a 2014 Australian duo comprising Zaachariaha Fielding and Kristal West

== Aviation ==
- Great Lakes Airlines (IATA designator: ZK)
- ZK, the aircraft registration prefix for New Zealand

== Politics ==
- Zentralkomitee, the Socialist Unity Party of Germany's executive body

== Science and technology ==
- Zero knowledge (disambiguation), various concepts in cryptographic proof
- Zettakelvin, an SI unit of temperature
- ZK (framework), an AJAX web framework for graphical UIs
