= ZN =

ZN or Zn may refer to:

== Algebra ==
- Z_{n}, a cyclic group
- $\mathbb{Z}_n,$ the ring of integers modulo n in modular arithmetic

== Geometry ==
- Azimuth, the angle between a reference plane and a point
- Zenith, the direction pointing directly above a particular location

== Science ==
- Zinc, symbol Zn, a chemical element
- Zettanewton (ZN), an SI unit of force
- Ziehl–Neelsen stain, a bacteriological stain

== Other uses ==
- Zontanoi Nekroi, a Greek hip hop group
- Air Bourbon, a French airline (2002–2004; IATA: ZN)
