= ZR =

ZR, Zr, or zr may refer to:

== Places by code ==
- Zaire, a central African country, 1971–1997 (reserved in ISO 3166), now Democratic Republic of the Congo
- Zrenjanin, a city in Serbia (on car license plates)

== Science and technology ==
- Zirconium, symbol Zr, a chemical element
- Zona reticularis, an anatomical feature of the adrenal cortex
- .zr, an abolished Internet top-level domain, for Zaire (now replaced by .cd, for Democratic Republic of the Congo)

== Transport ==
=== Aviation ===
- Aviacon Zitotrans (IATA: ZR)
- A US Navy hull classification symbol: Rigid airship (ZR)

=== Land transport ===
- ZR (bus), a private taxi-bus in Barbados
- Kawasaki ZR-7, a motorcycle model
- MG ZR, a hatchback car model
- Toyota ZR engine, an automotive engine
- Zambia Railways (ZR, or ZRL), a state rail operator in Zambia

== Other uses ==
- Nikon ZR, a mirrorless cinema camera
- Zettai ryōiki, otaku slang for a style of dress
- ZR, a fictional assistant of the Masked Marvel (Centaur Publications)
