= Zync Global =

Indian company

Zync Mobiles
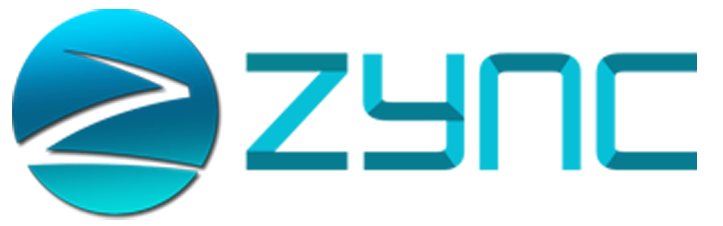
- Type: Private Limited company
- Industry: Telecommunications
- Founded: New Delhi, India (2011)
- Founder: Amul Mohan Mittal & Ashish Garg
- Headquarters: Noida, India
- Number of locations: South Asia, Middle East and South Africa
- Products: Mobile phones, smartphones, tablets
- Revenue: more than 50 cr
- Website: Official website

Zync Global Pvt Ltd is an Indian company that offers tablets, phablets, and GSM mobile services in India. Apart from tablet manufacturing, the company is moving into the mobile and accessories manufacturing.

== Tablets ==
Zync launched India's first tablet, the Z-990, to come pre-loaded with Android 4.0 (ice cream sandwich). It has a 7-inch capacitive display (800×480 pixel), 1.2 GHz processor, 1 GB RAM and 4 GB internal storage (expandable via microSD card). Other specifications include a front VGA camera for video calls, mini-HDMI out, full-size USB 2.0 port with host functionality (works with keyboards and 3G USB dongles), mini-USB for data connectivity, Wi-Fi, Bluetooth and GPS. Apart from Z-990, Zync has also launched several other tablets.
