= Nikon Nikkor Z DX 16-50 mm f/3.5-6.3 VR =

Nikkor Z DX 16-50 mm f/3.5–6.3 VR
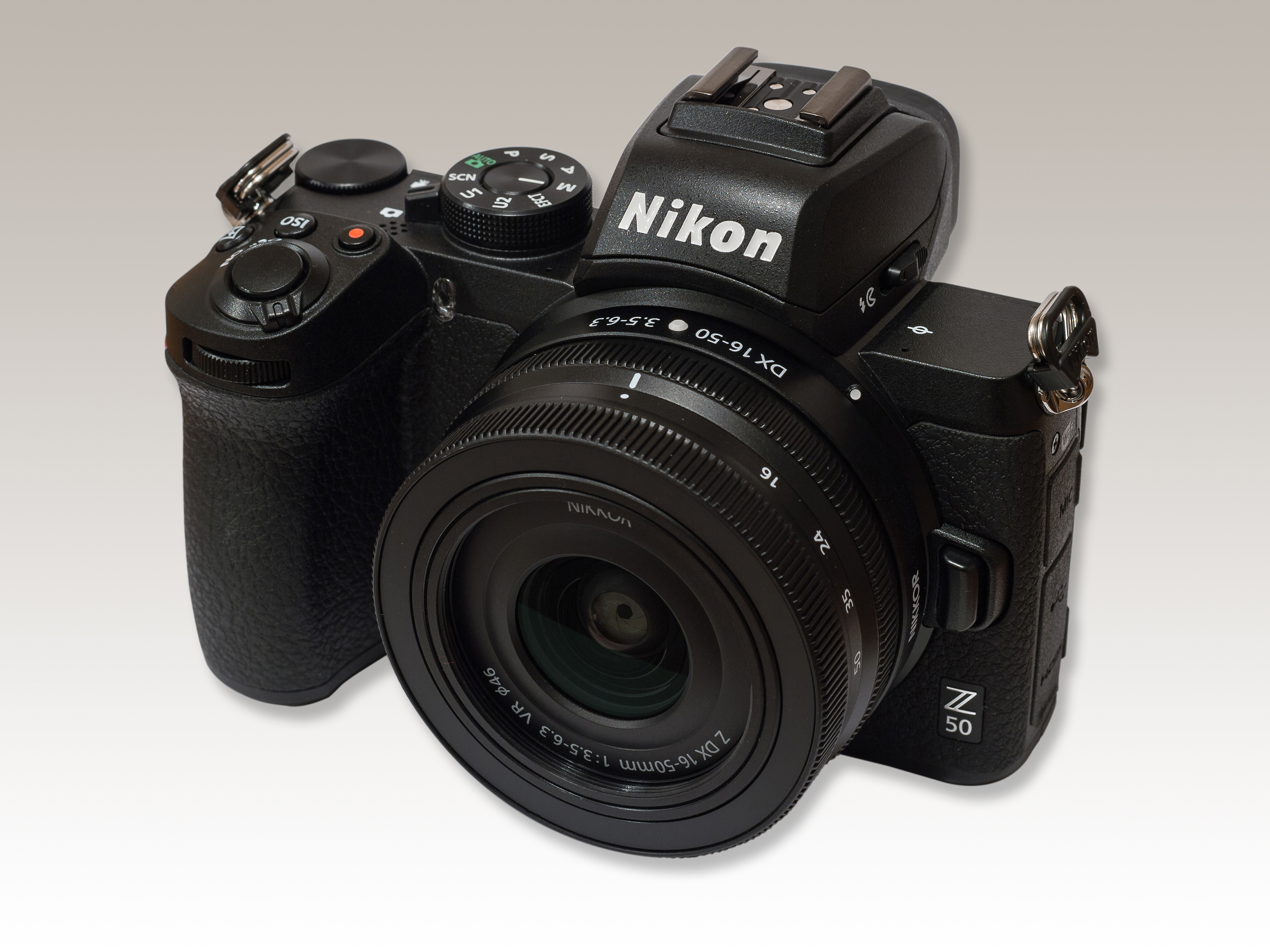
- Maker: Nikon
- Lens mount: Z-mount

Technical data
- Type: Zoom
- Focus drive: Stepping motor
- Focal length: 16-50mm
- Focal length (35mm equiv.): 24-75mm
- Image format: DX (APS-C)
- Aperture (max/min): f/3.5–22 (wide) f/6.3–40 (tele)
- Close focus distance: 0.2m
- Max. magnification: 1:5
- Diaphragm blades: 7 (rounded)
- Construction: 9 elements in 7 groups

Features
- Lens-based stabilization: Yes Yes
- Macro capable: No No
- Application: Normal zoom

Physical
- Max. length: 32 mm
- Diameter: 70 mm
- Weight: 135 g
- Filter diameter: 46 mm

Software
- Latest firmware: 1.02 (as of 26 November 2024)
- User flashable: Yes Yes
- Lens ID: 11

Angle of view
- Diagonal: 83°–31°30' (DX)

History
- Introduction: October 2019

Retail info
- MSRP: 299 USD (as of 2019)

The Nikon Nikkor Z DX 16-50 mm f/3.5–6.3 VR is a DX-format (APS-C) zoom lens with a variable aperture of f/3.5–6.3, manufactured by Nikon for use on Nikon Z-mount mirrorless cameras.

== Introduction ==
On October 10, 2019, Nikon announced the first DX-format (APS-C) Z-mount camera, the Nikon Z50. Along with the camera, two DX lenses were also released, the Nikkor Z DX 16-50 mm f/3.5–6.3 VR and the Nikkor Z DX 50-250 mm f/4.5–6.3 VR. According to Nikon, at the time of release, the lens was the absolute smallest Nikkor Z lens (superseded by the full-frame Nikkor Z 26 mm f/2.8 in 2023), and also the smallest APS-C/DX-format lens ever. It sports an all-plastic construction and a plastic mount, to make the lens lighter. The lens has a retractable design, making it more compact when not in use. Unlike previous DX-format kit lenses for the F-mount, the 18-55 mm f/3.5–5.6 zooms, this lens offers a shorter focal length on both ends (by 2 and 5 mm, respectively), with a darker aperture on the telephoto end (f/6.3 instead of f/5.6). The lens does not come with a lens hood.

== Silver version (SL) ==
On June 29, 2021, Nikon also announced an otherwise both optically and design-wise identical silver version of the lens, alongside the release of the Nikon Zfc and the Special Edition version of the Nikkor Z 28 mm f/2.8 (SE) prime lens. The "SL" designation is used in the product name by retailers, to distinguish the two versions.

== Features ==
- 16-50 mm focal length (approximately equivalent field of view of a 24-75 mm lens on a full-frame format camera)
- Autofocus using a stepping motor (STM), focus-by-wire manual focusing
- 9 elements in 7 groups (including 1 ED and 4 aspherical lens elements)
- 7-blade rounded diaphragm
- Vibration Reduction (VR) optical stabilization
- Internal focusing (IF lens)
- One customizable control ring at the back (manual focusing by default, aperture, ISO and exposure compensation functions can be assigned to it)
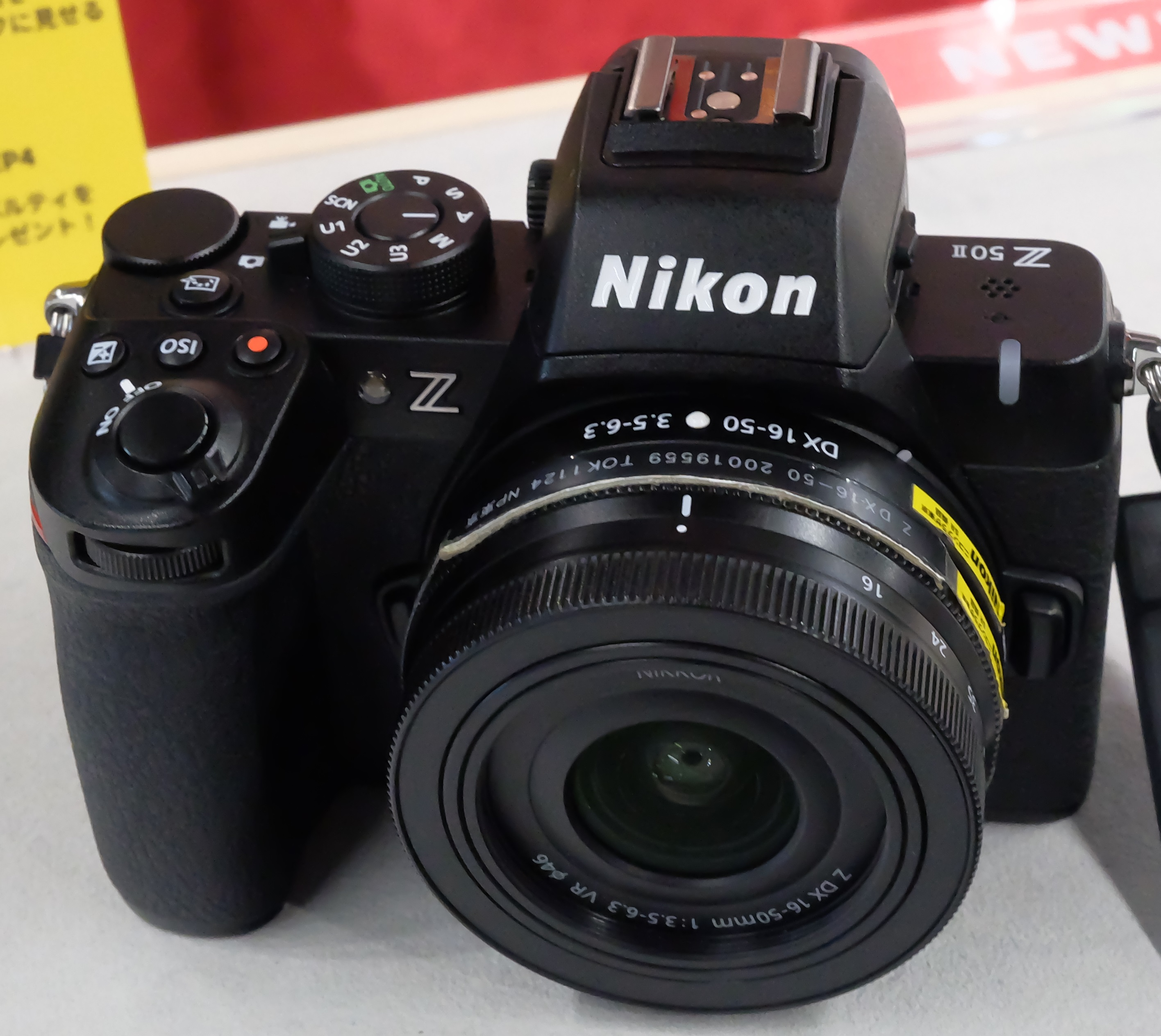
On a Nikon Z50II

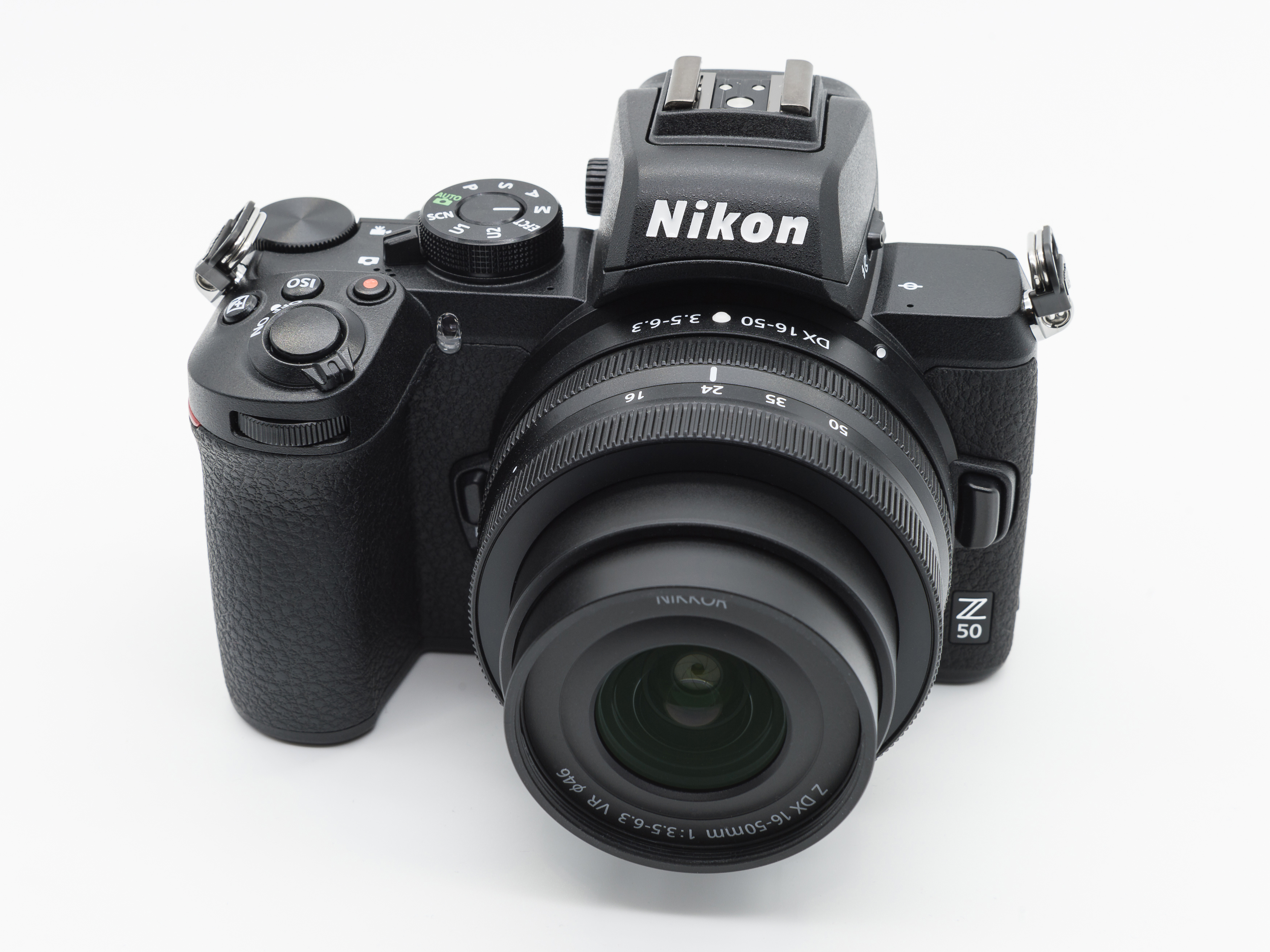
On a Nikon Z50

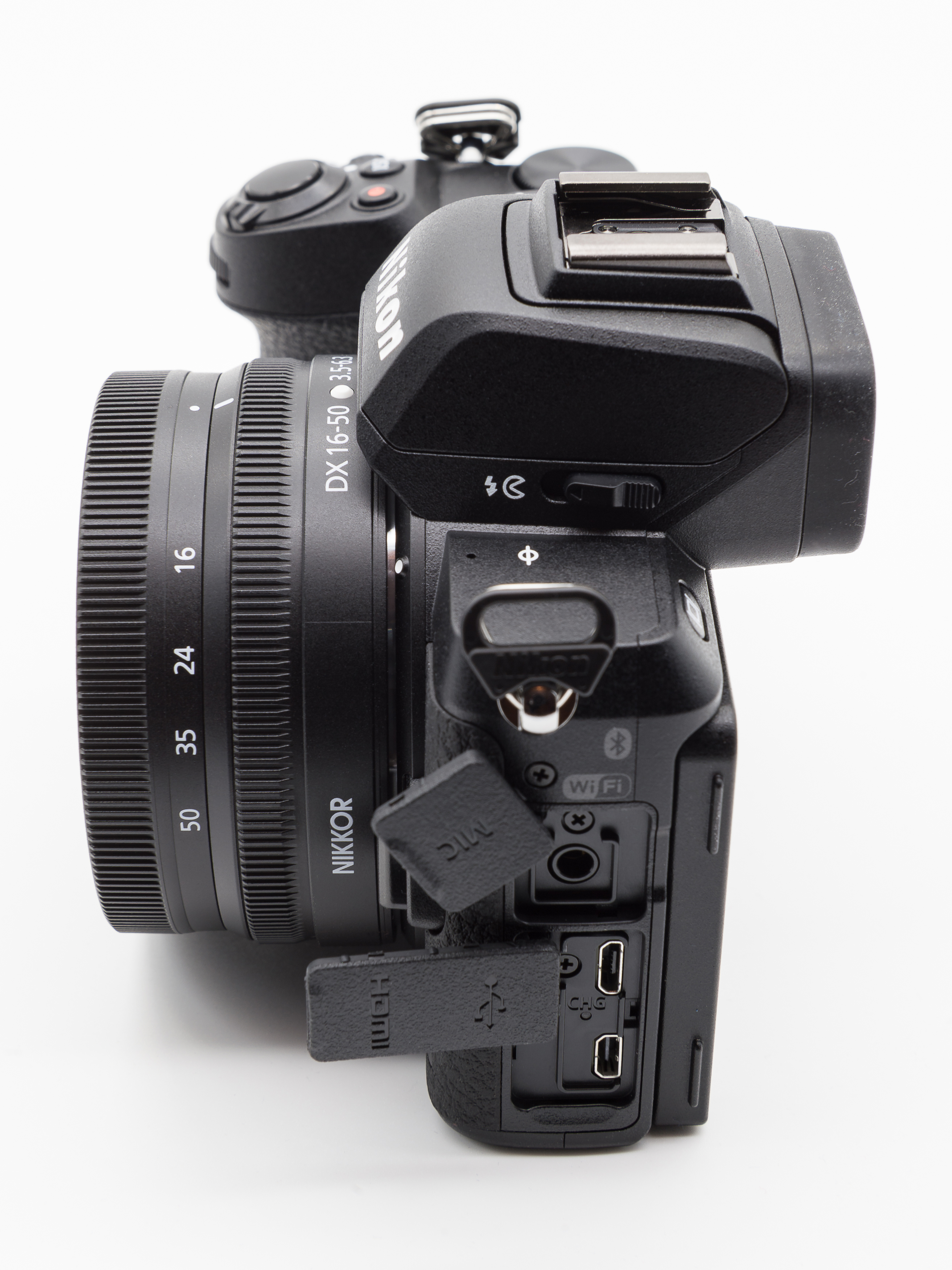
On a Nikon Z50

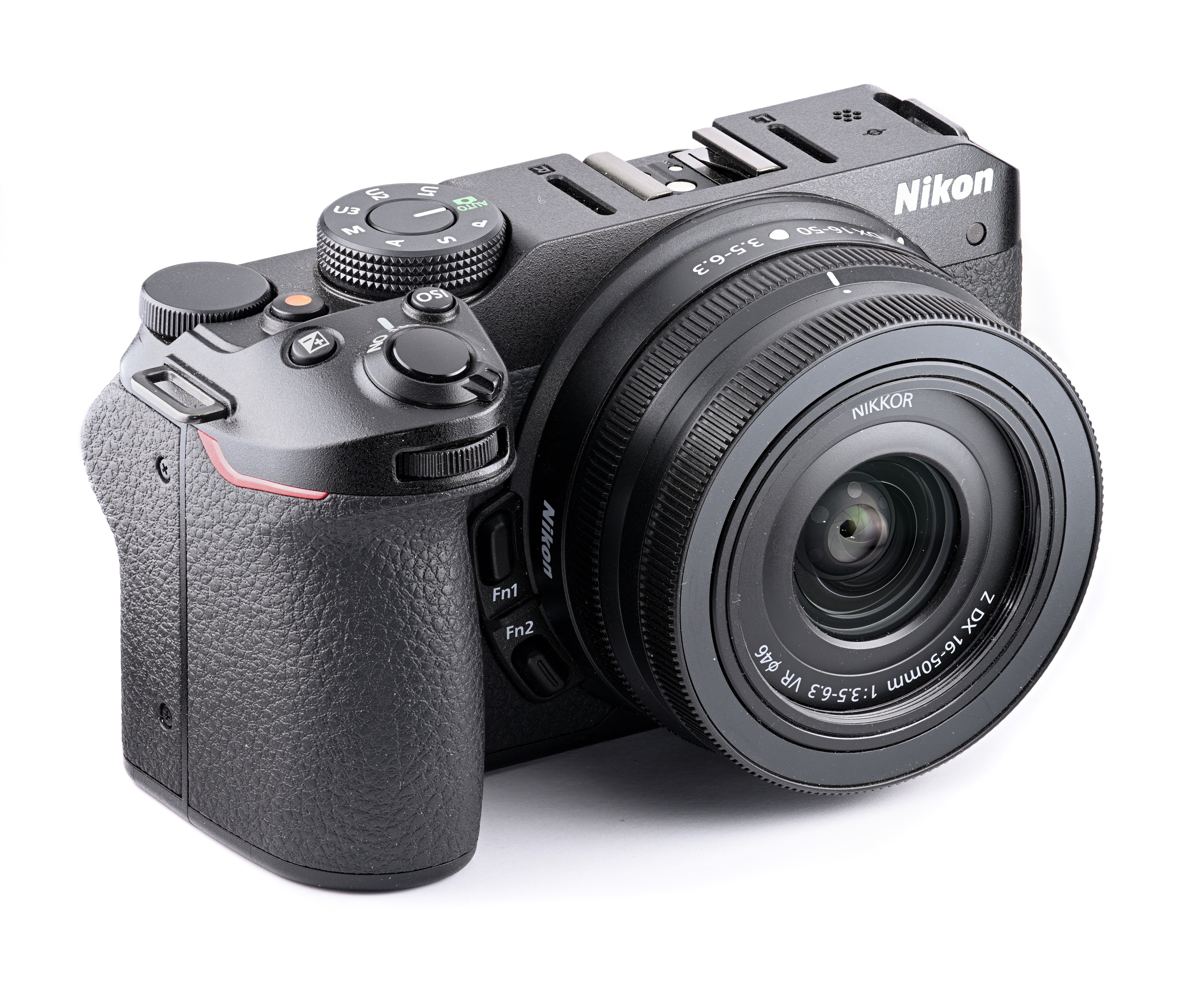
On a Nikon Z30

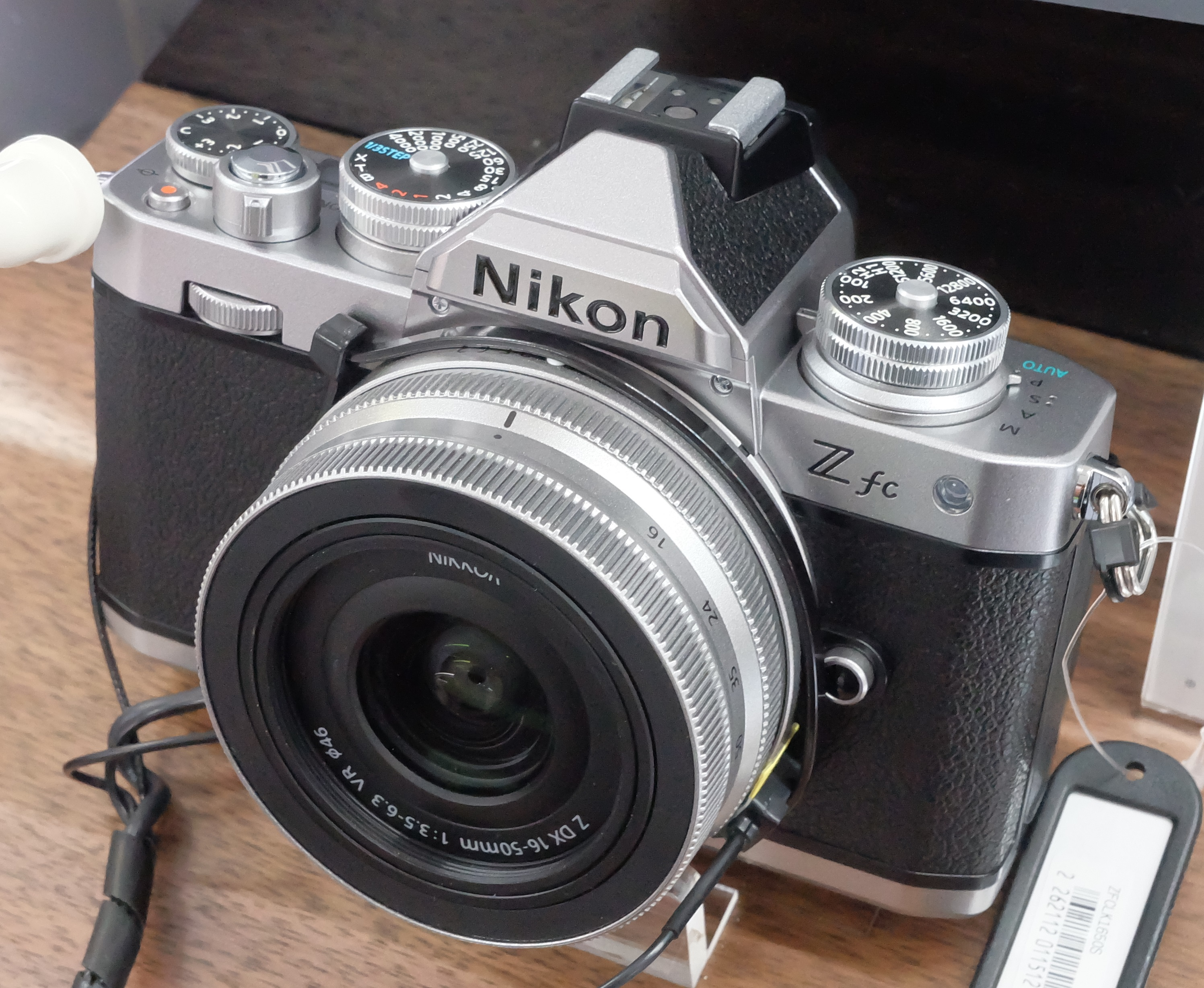
Silver version (SL), mounted on a Nikon Zfc

== Sample images ==
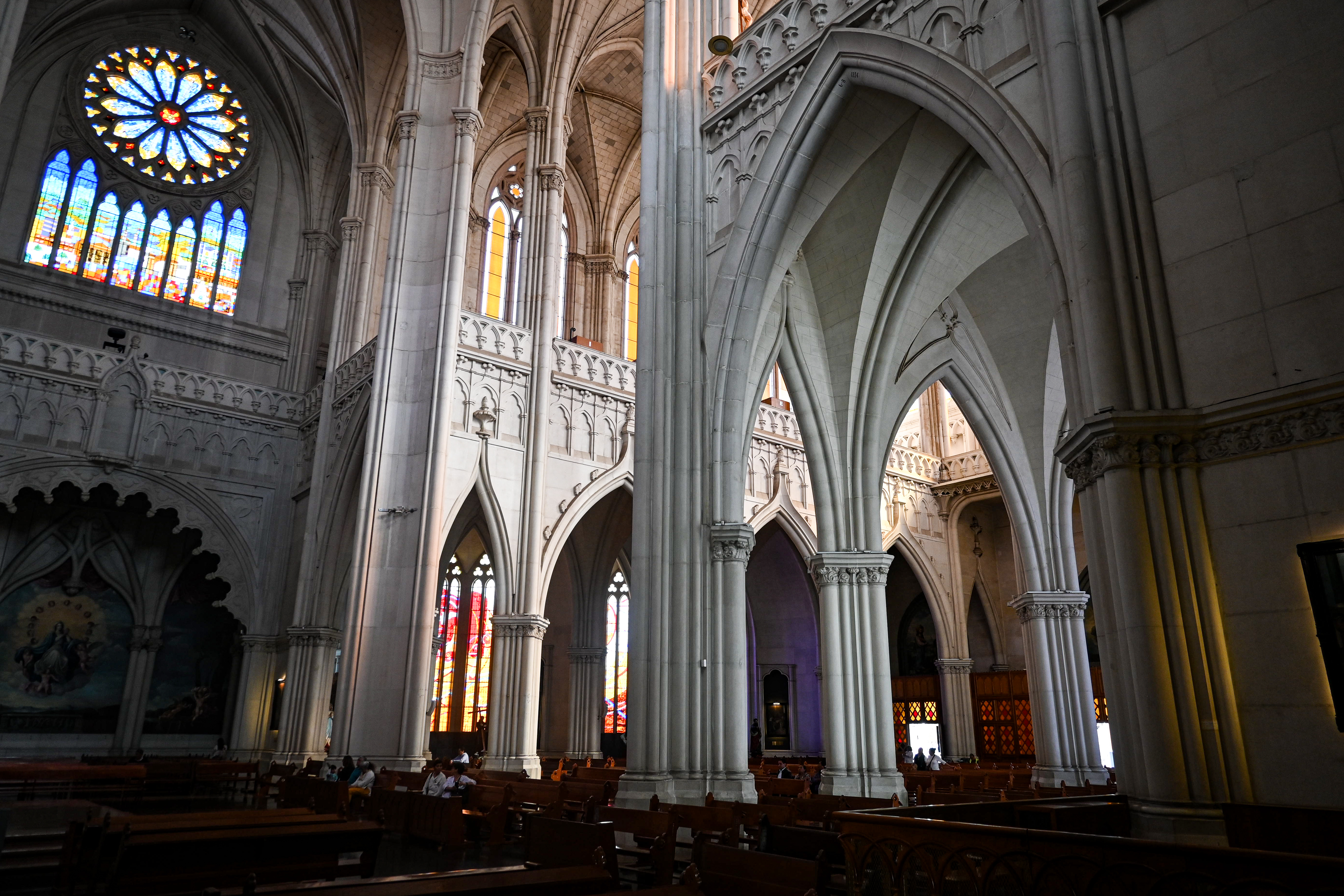
At 16 mm, f/3.5

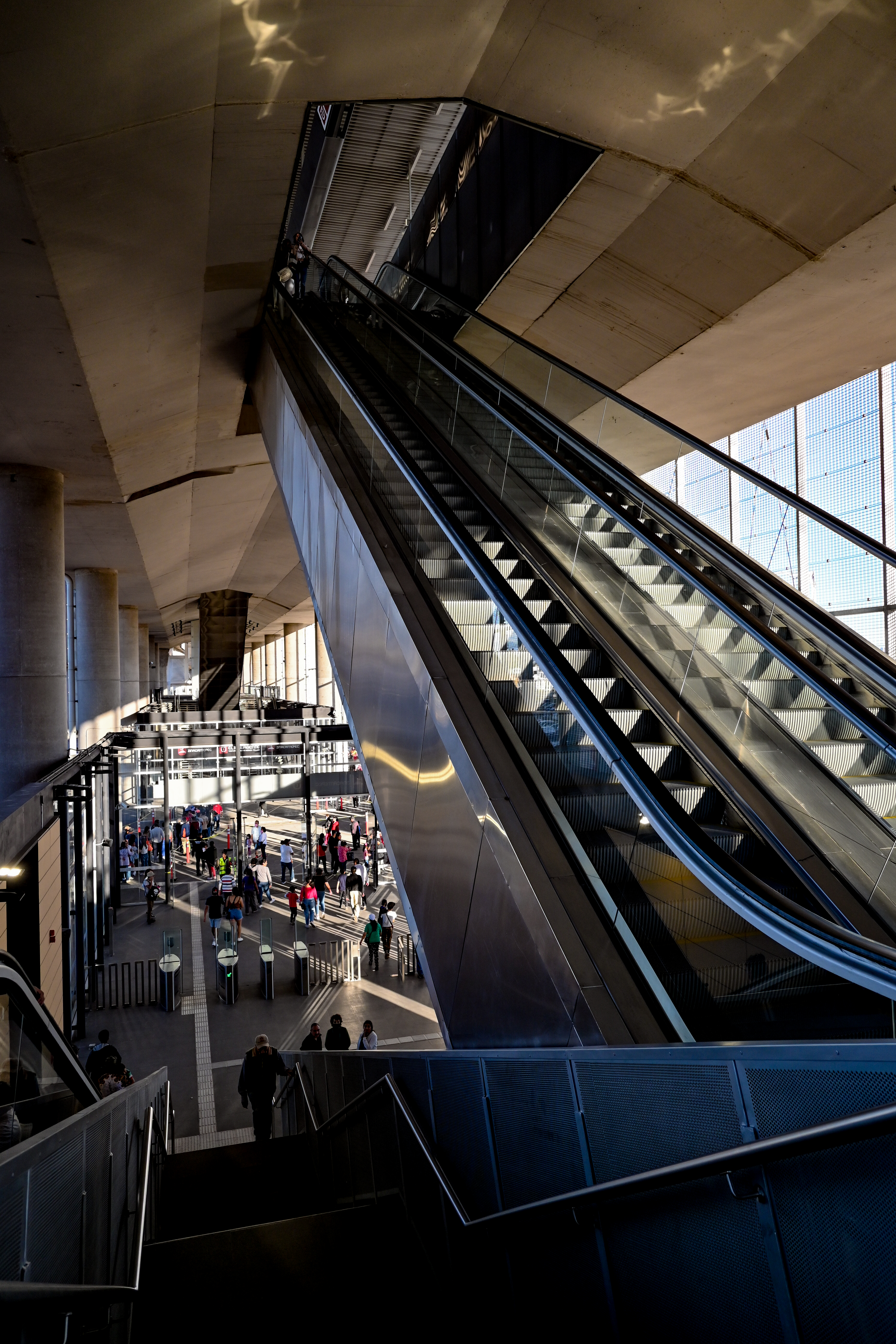
At 16 mm, f/4.5

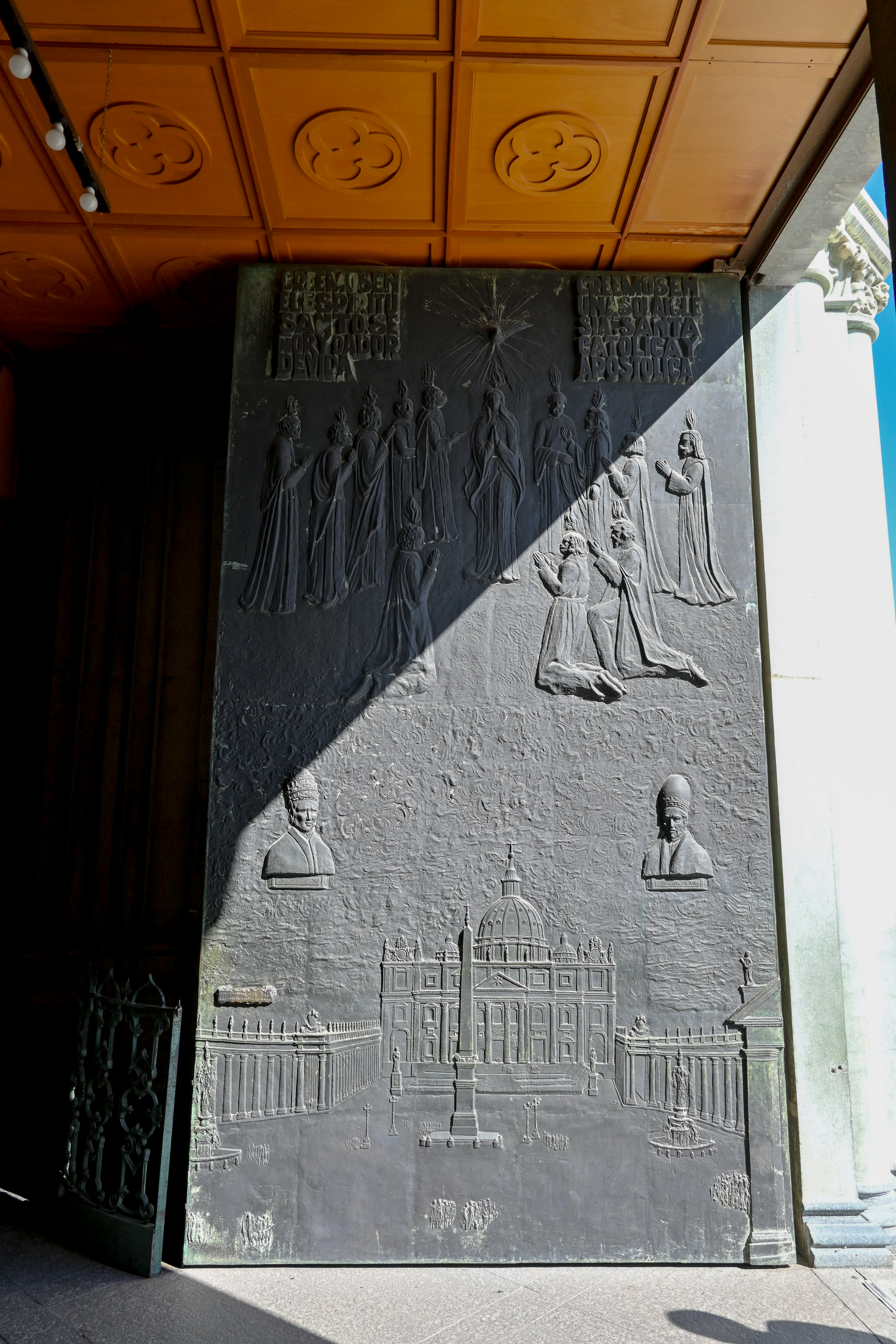
At 16 mm, f/5.6

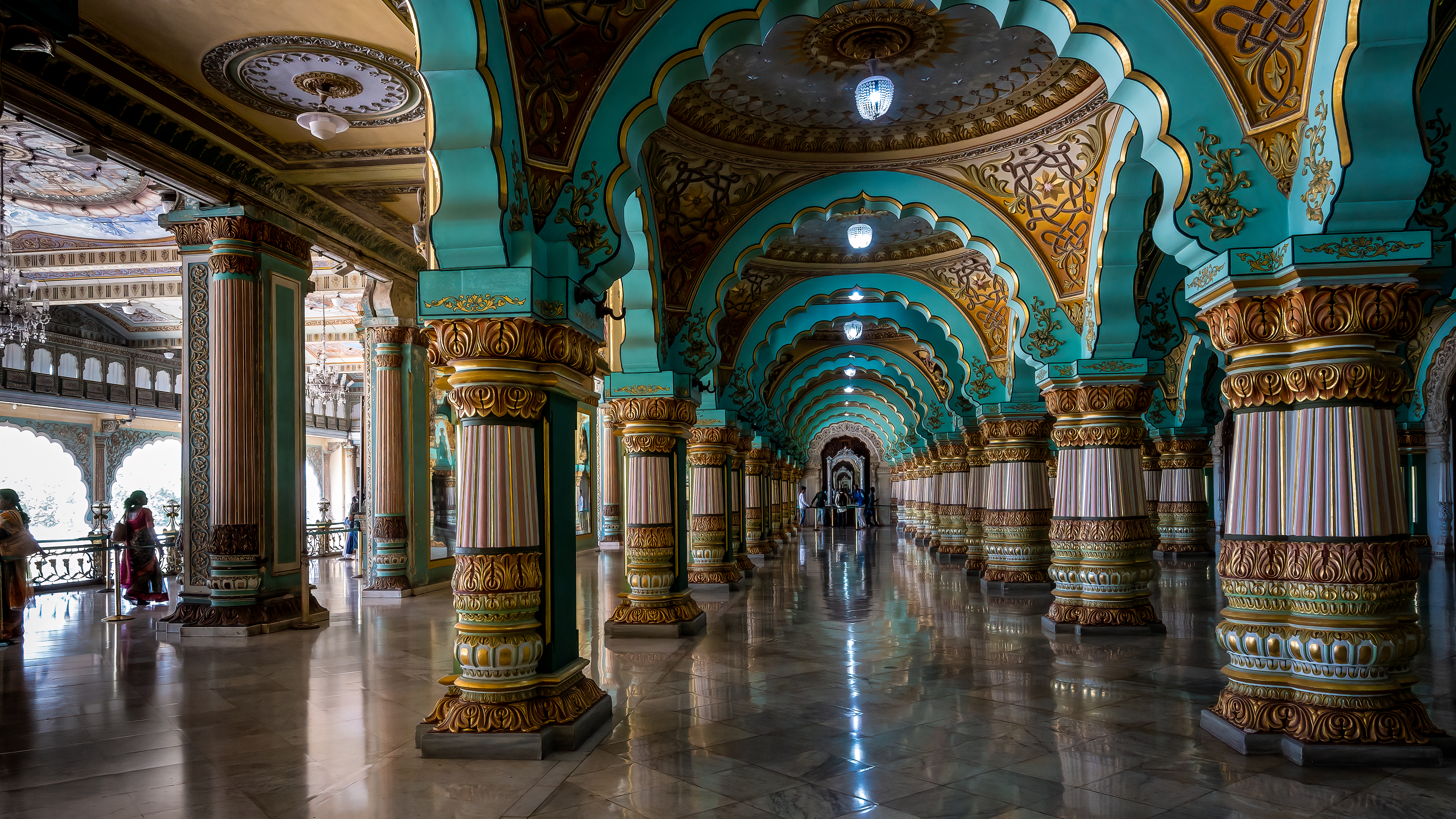
At 16 mm, f/8

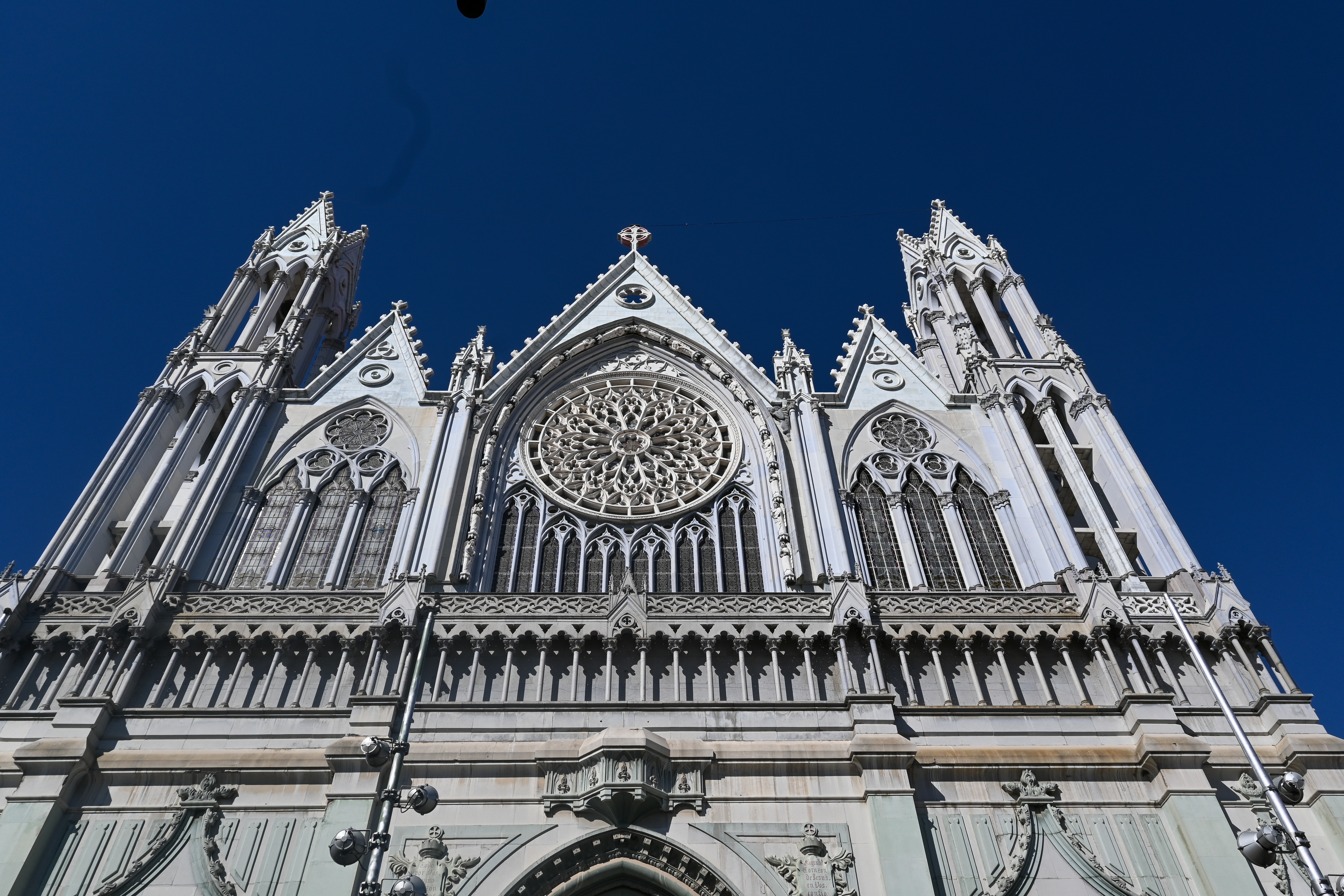
At 16 mm, f/8

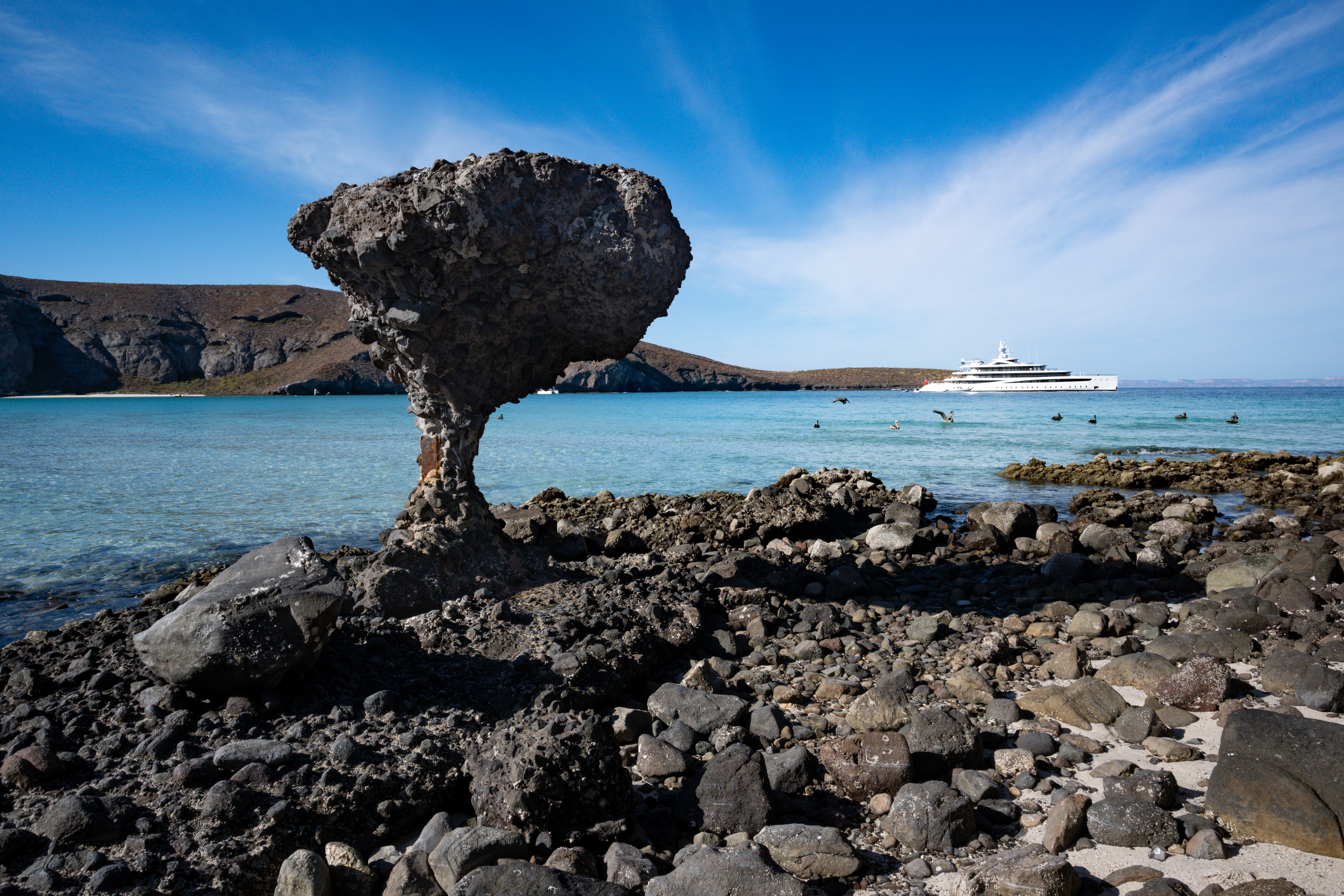
At 16 mm, f/9

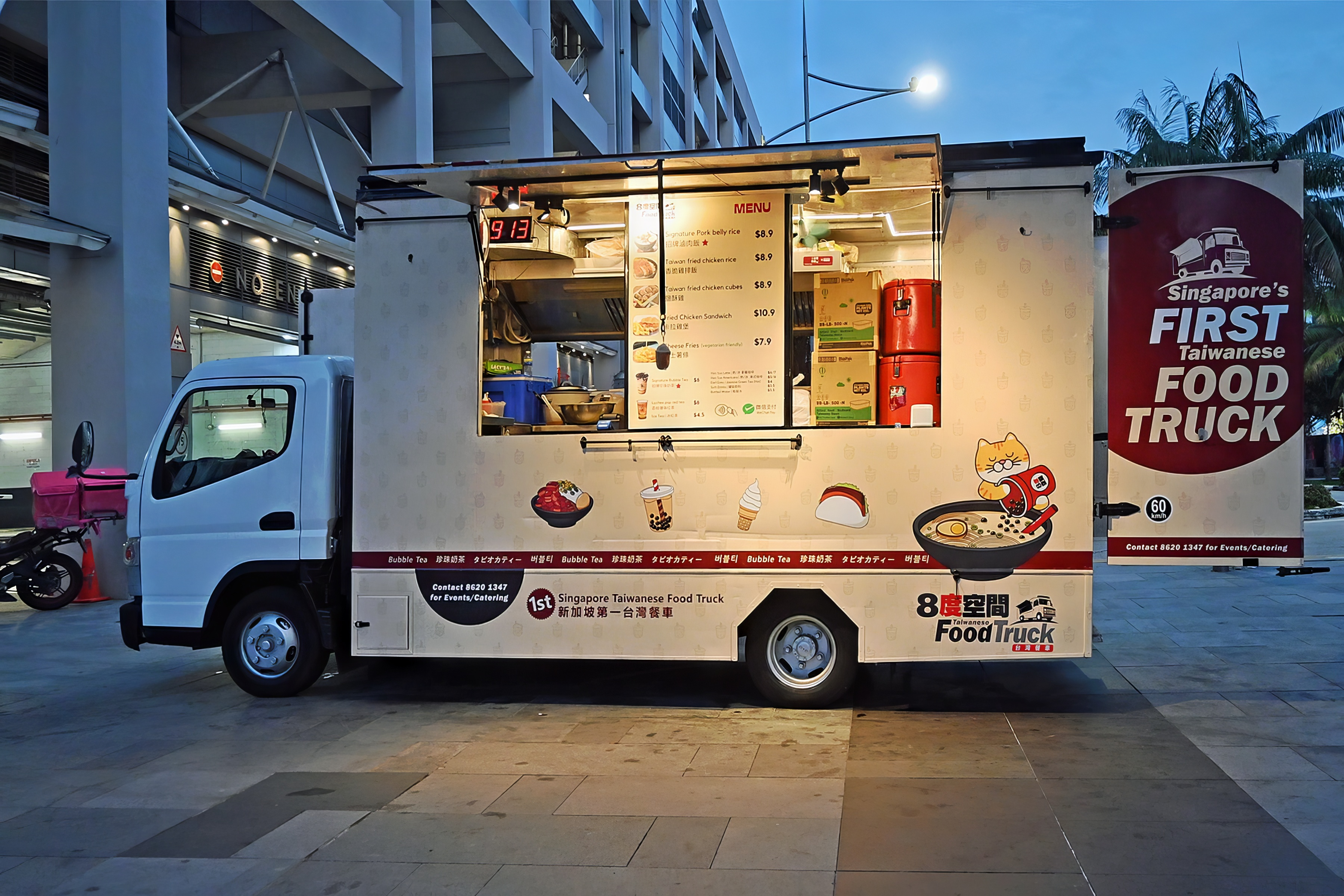
At 18.5 mm, f/3.8

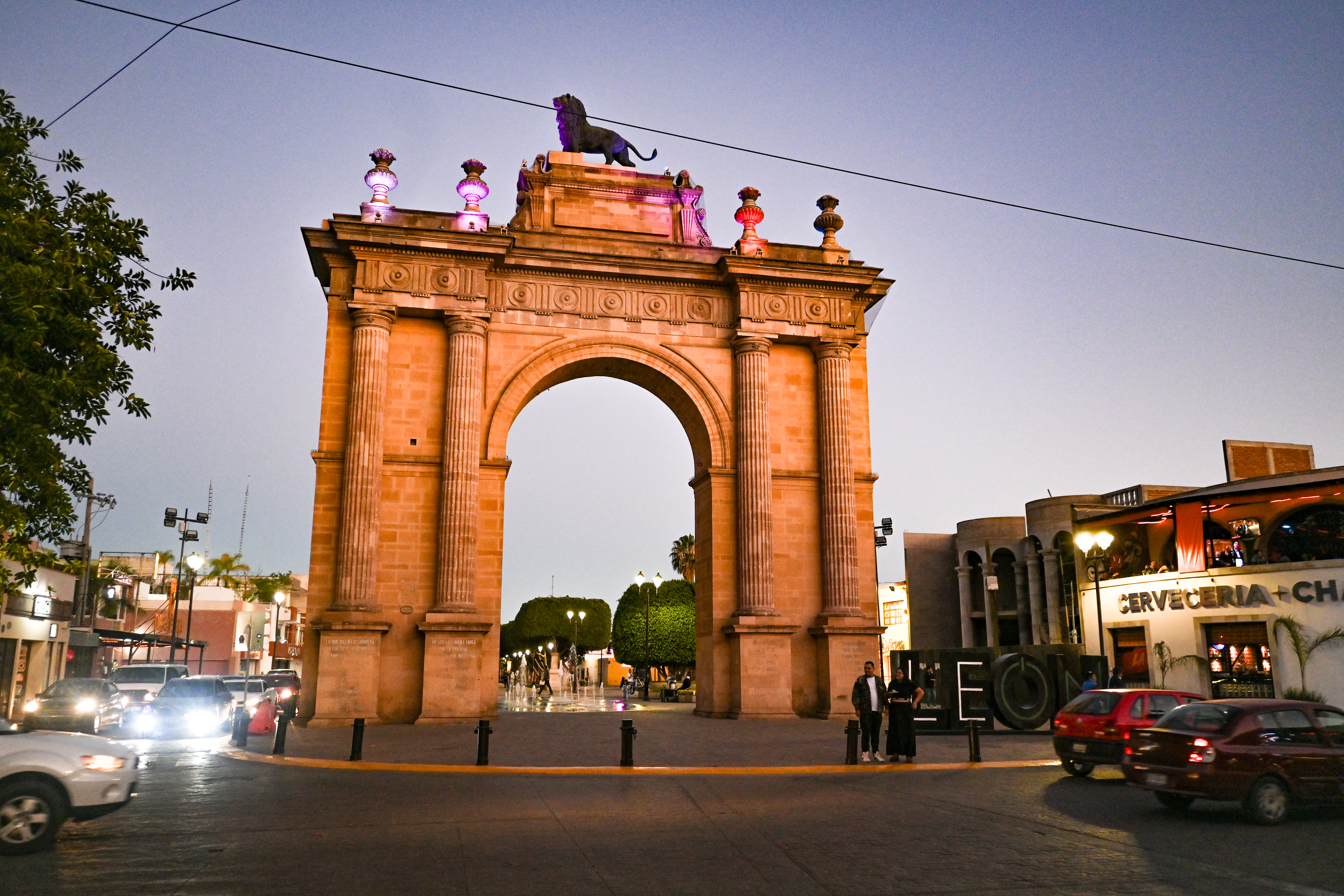
At 19 mm, f/3.8

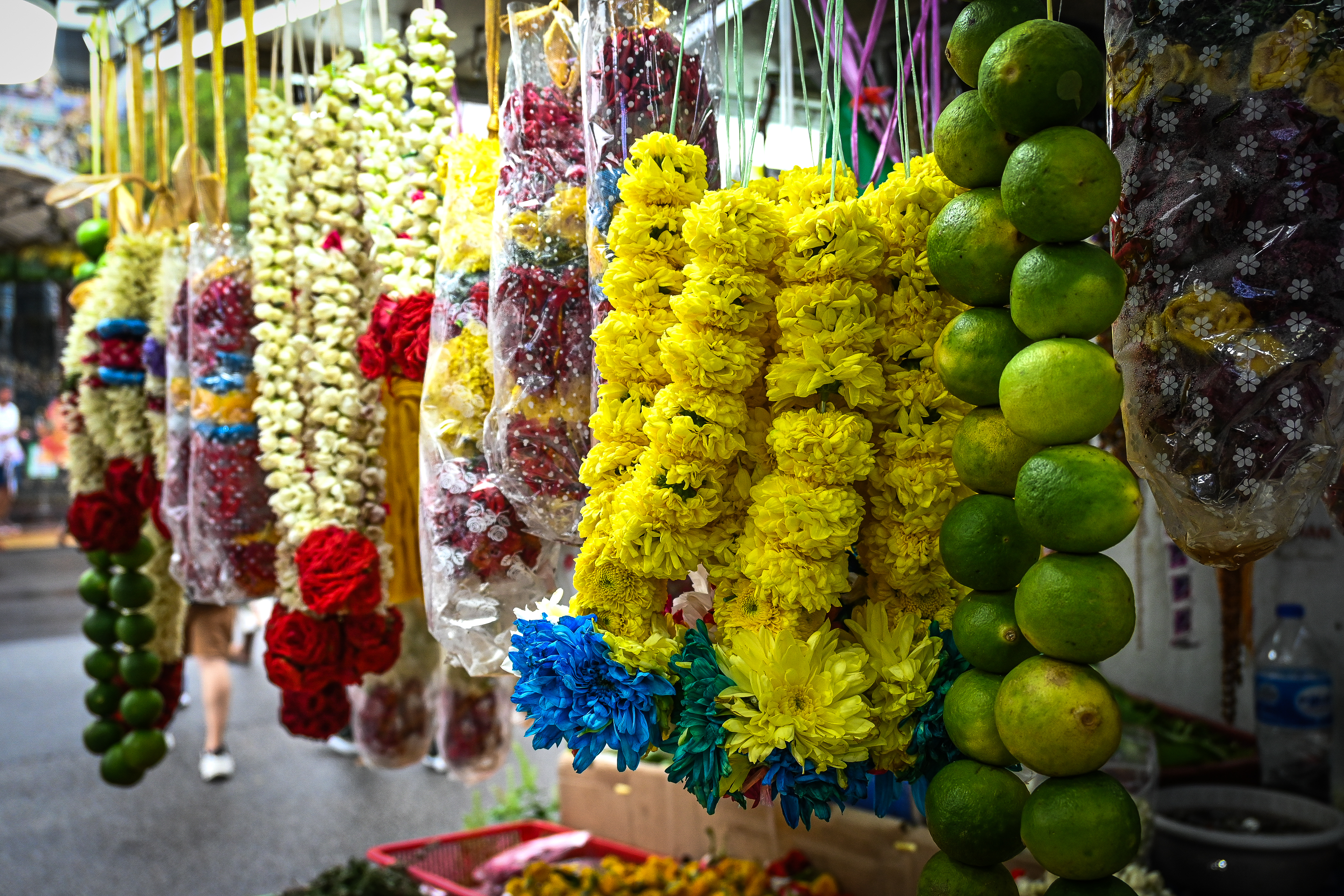
At 23 mm, f/4.5

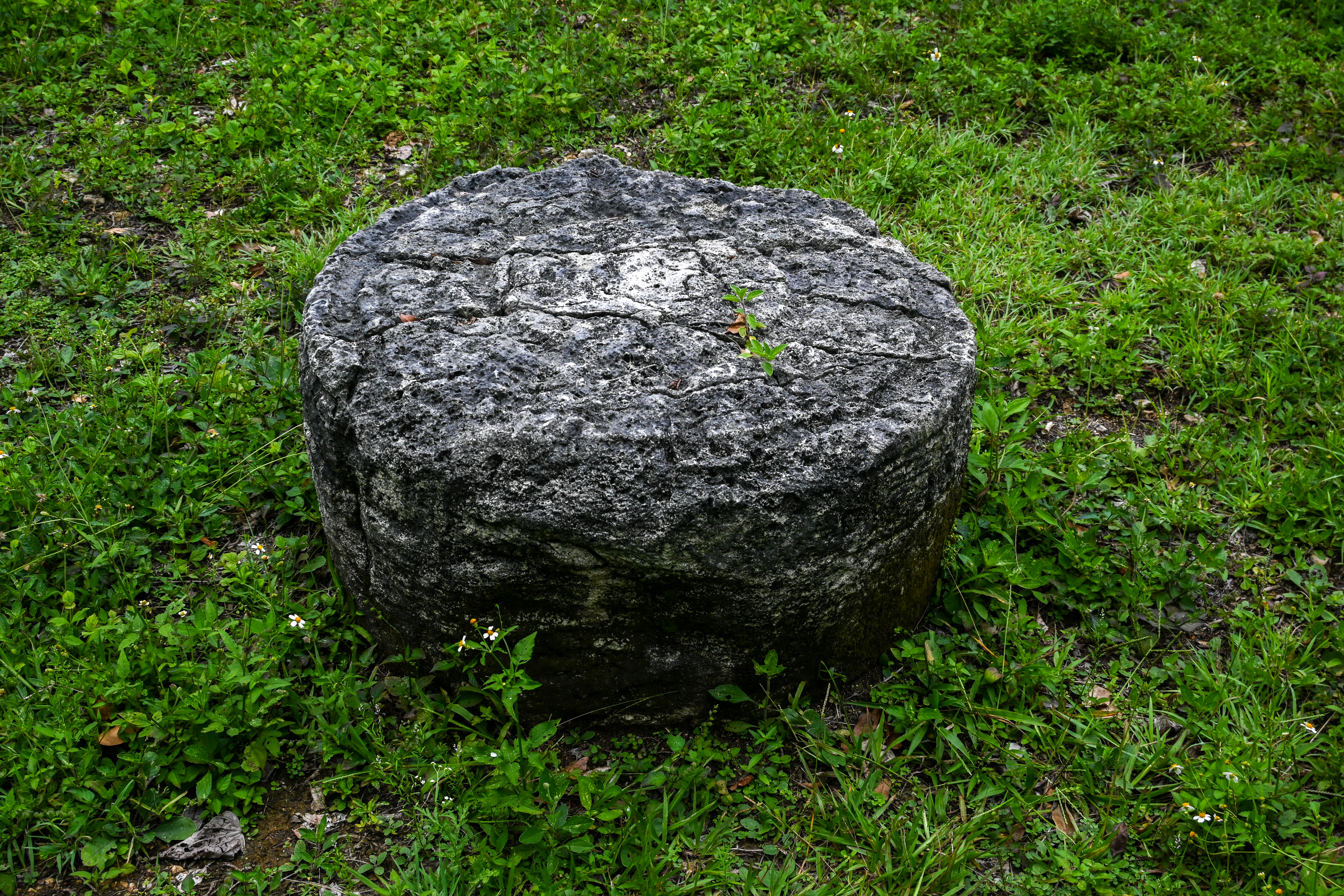
At 28 mm, f/6.3

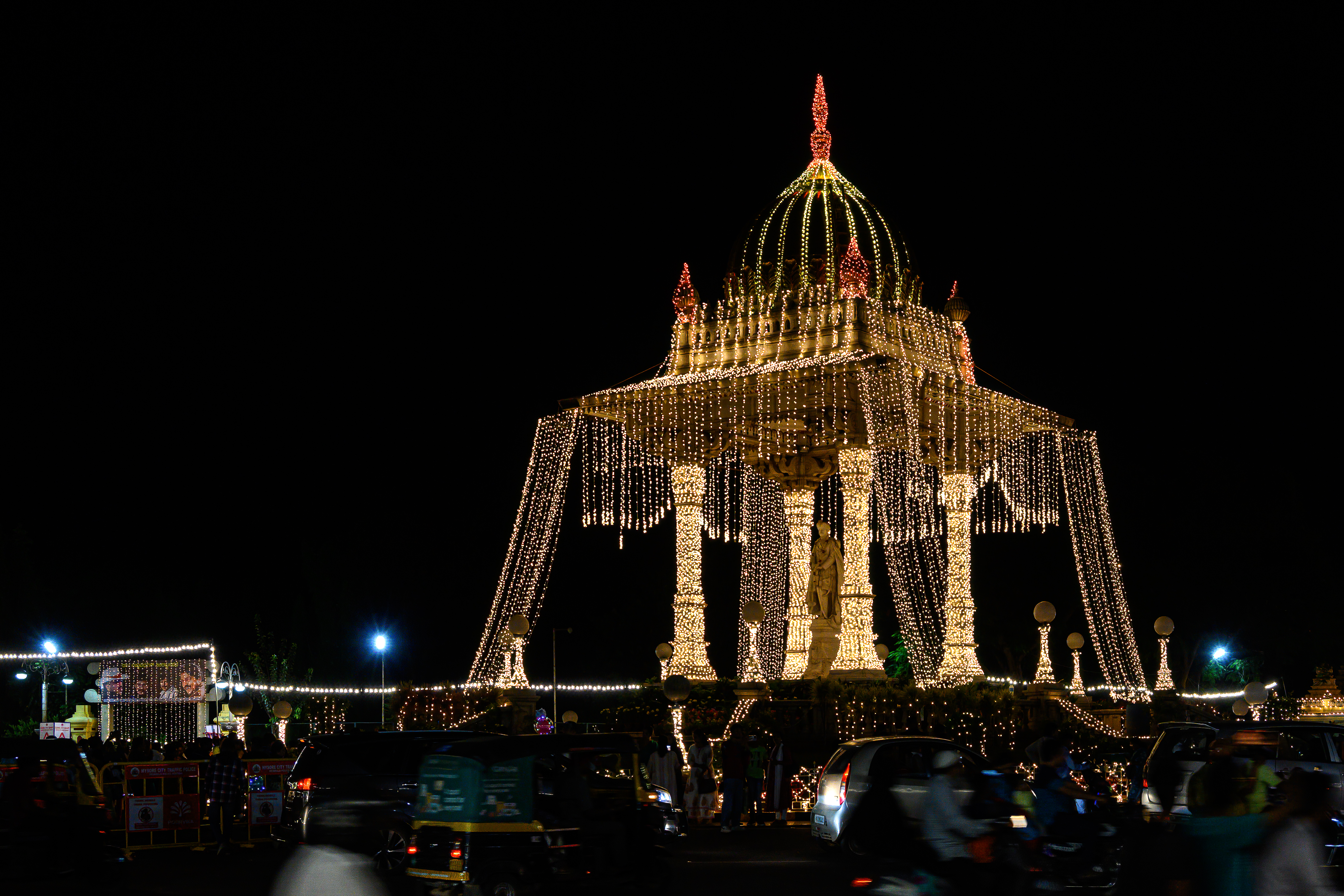
At 31.5 mm, f/8

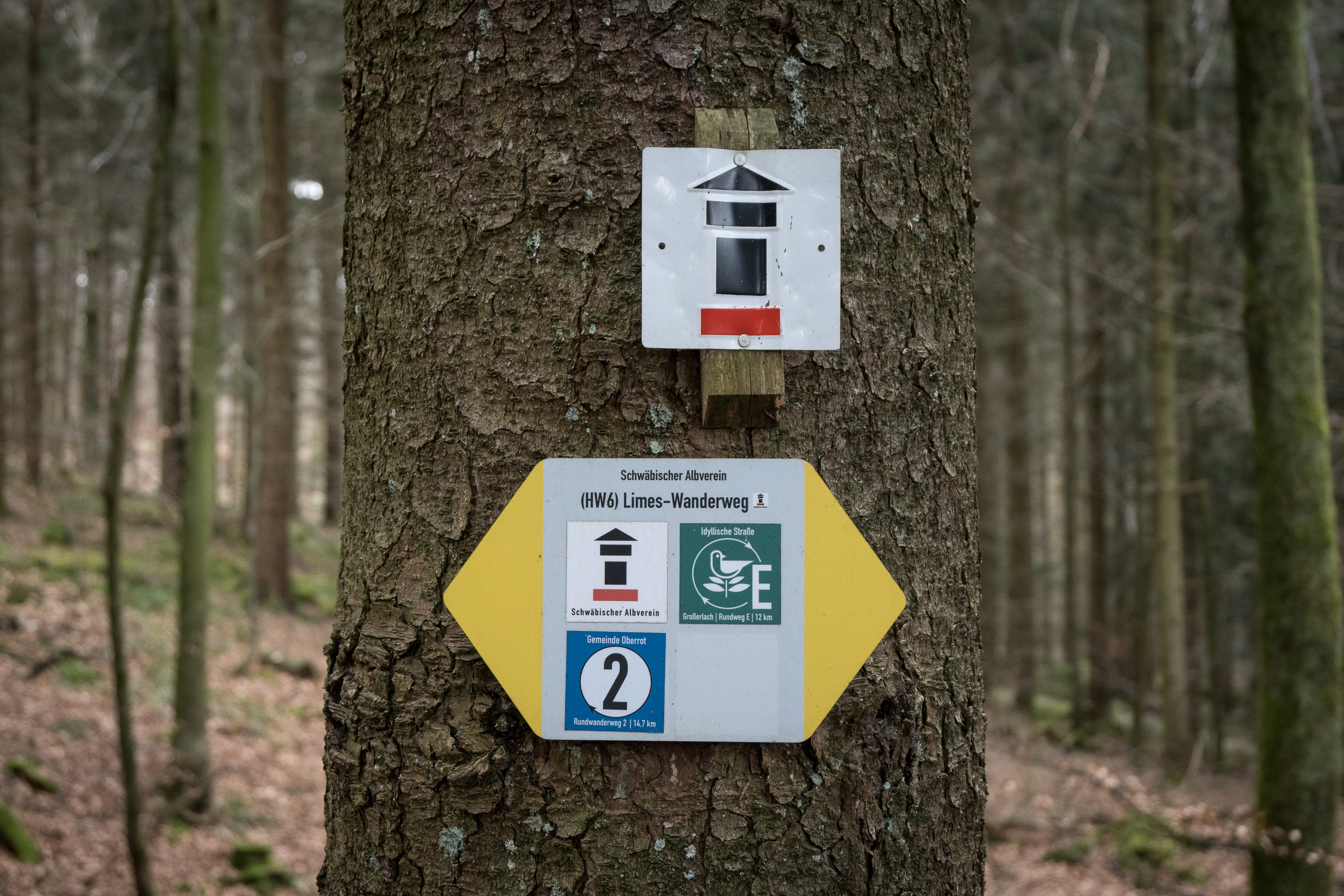
At 36 mm, f/5.3

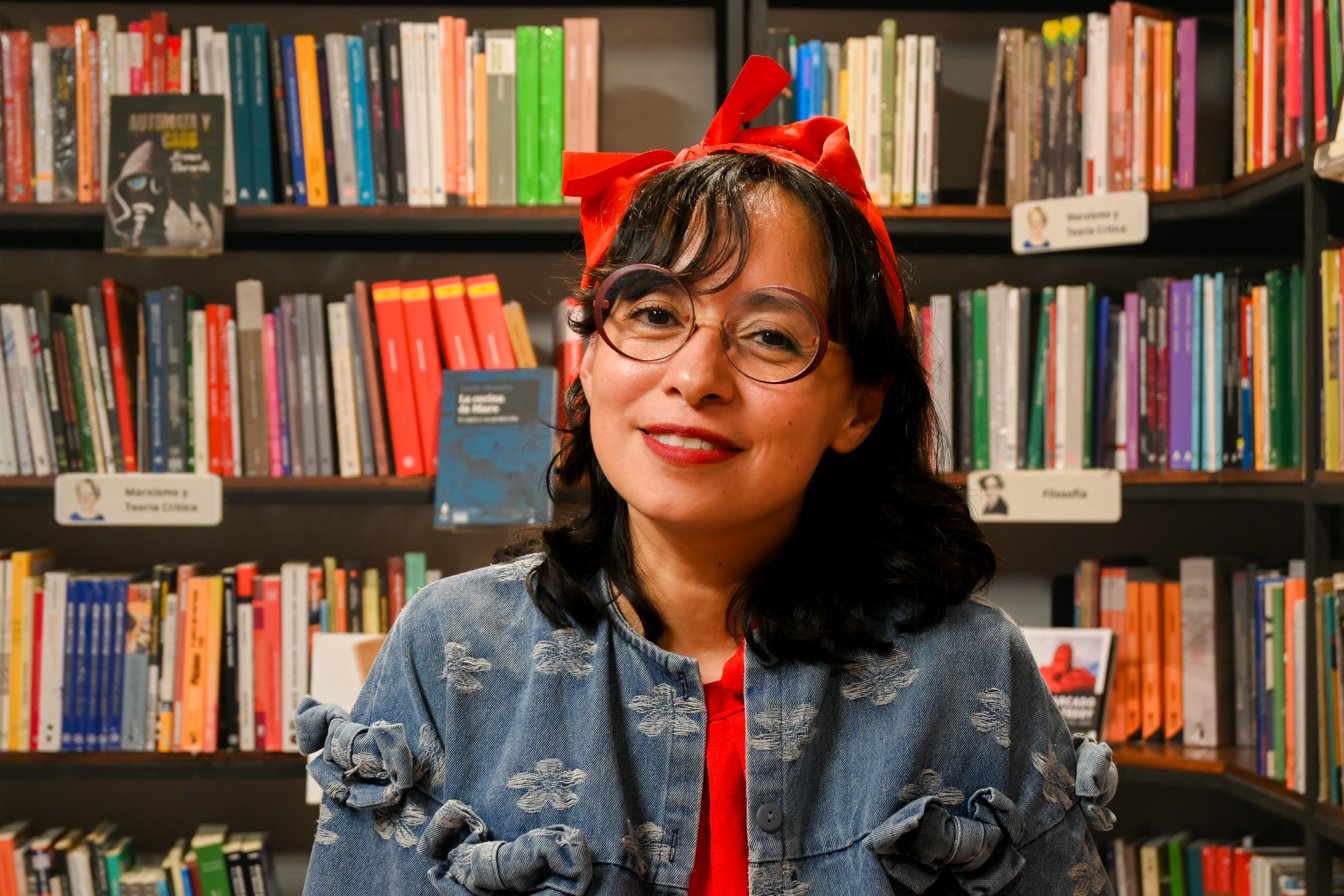
At 41 mm, f/5.6

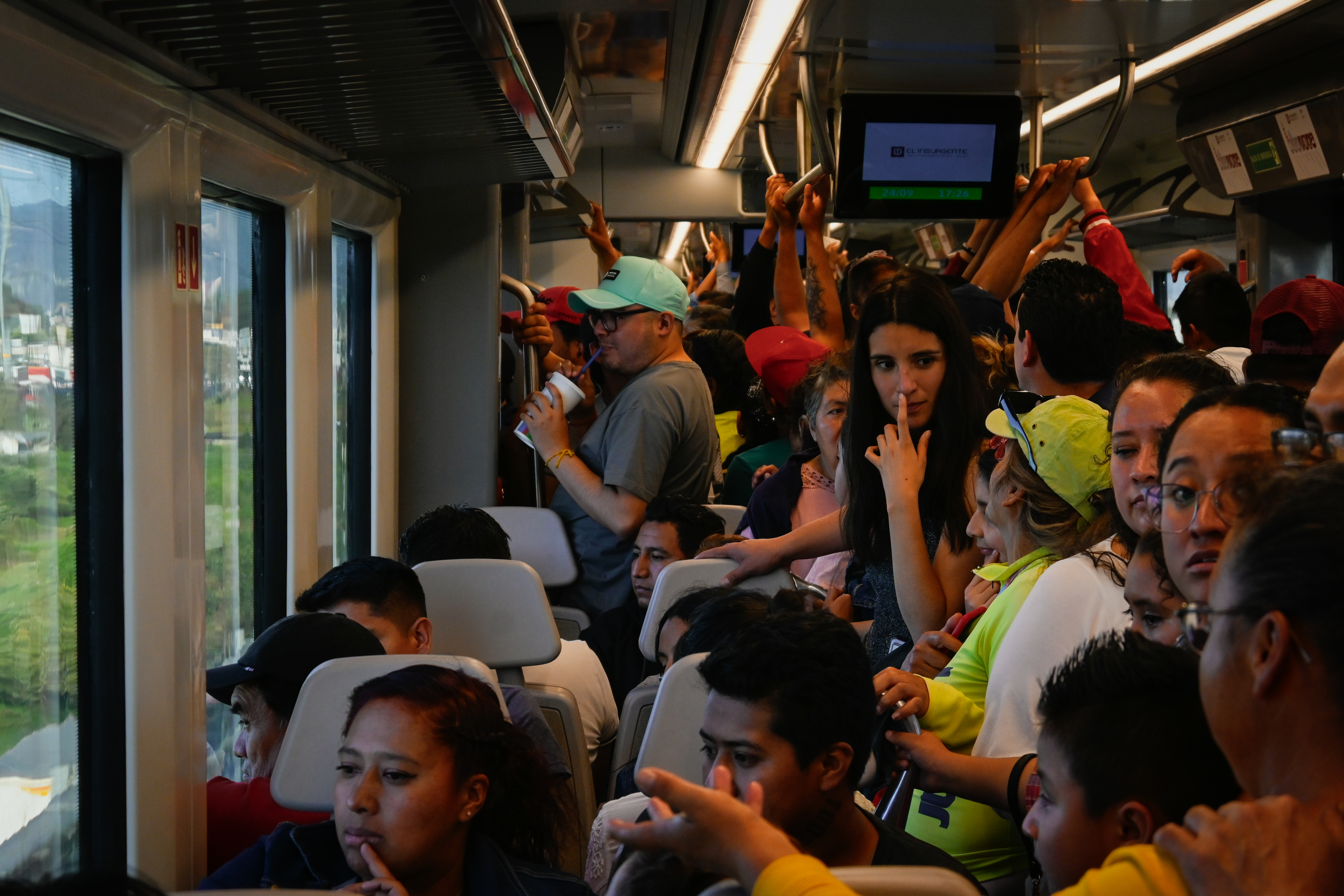
At 50 mm, f/6.3

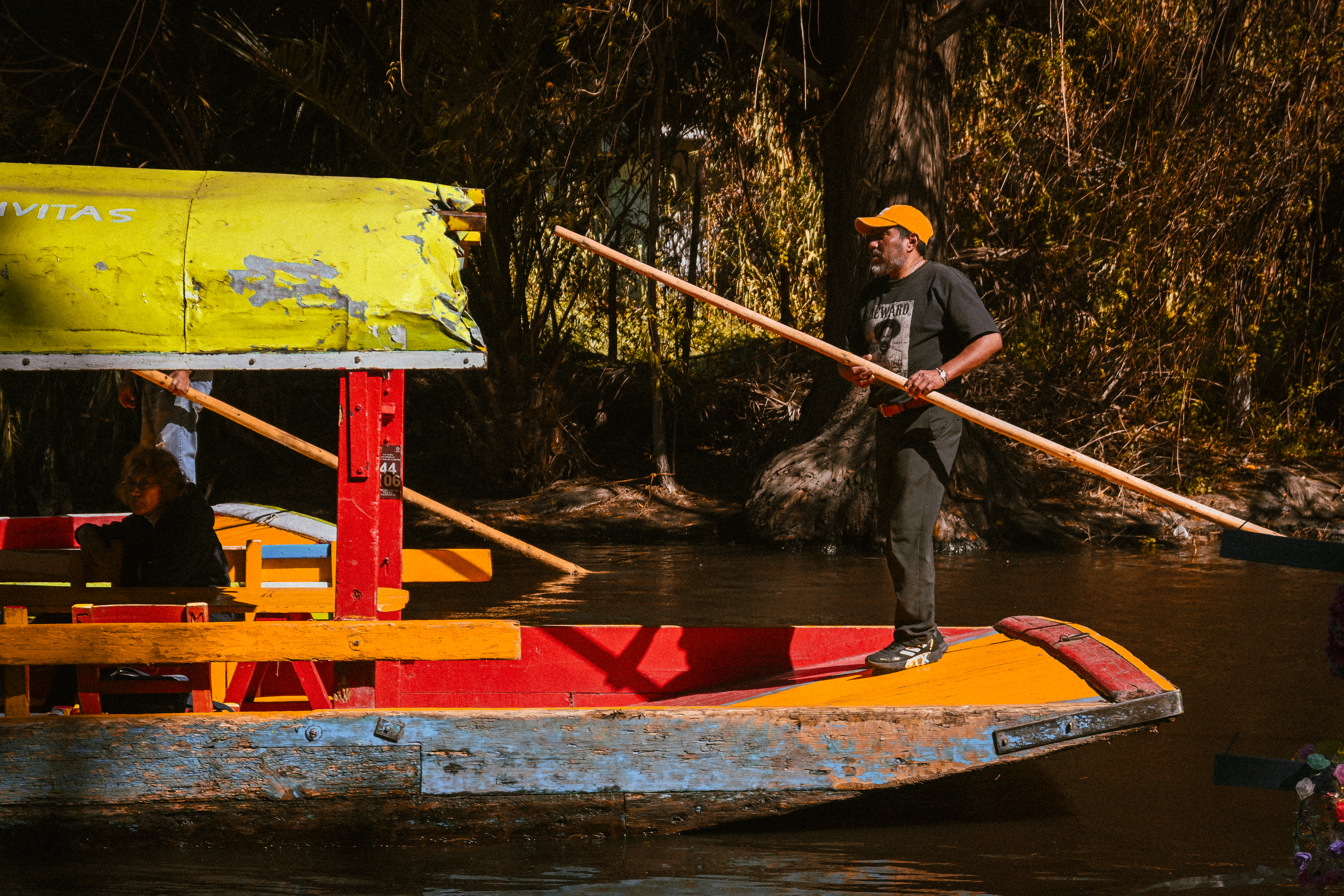
At 50 mm, f/7.1

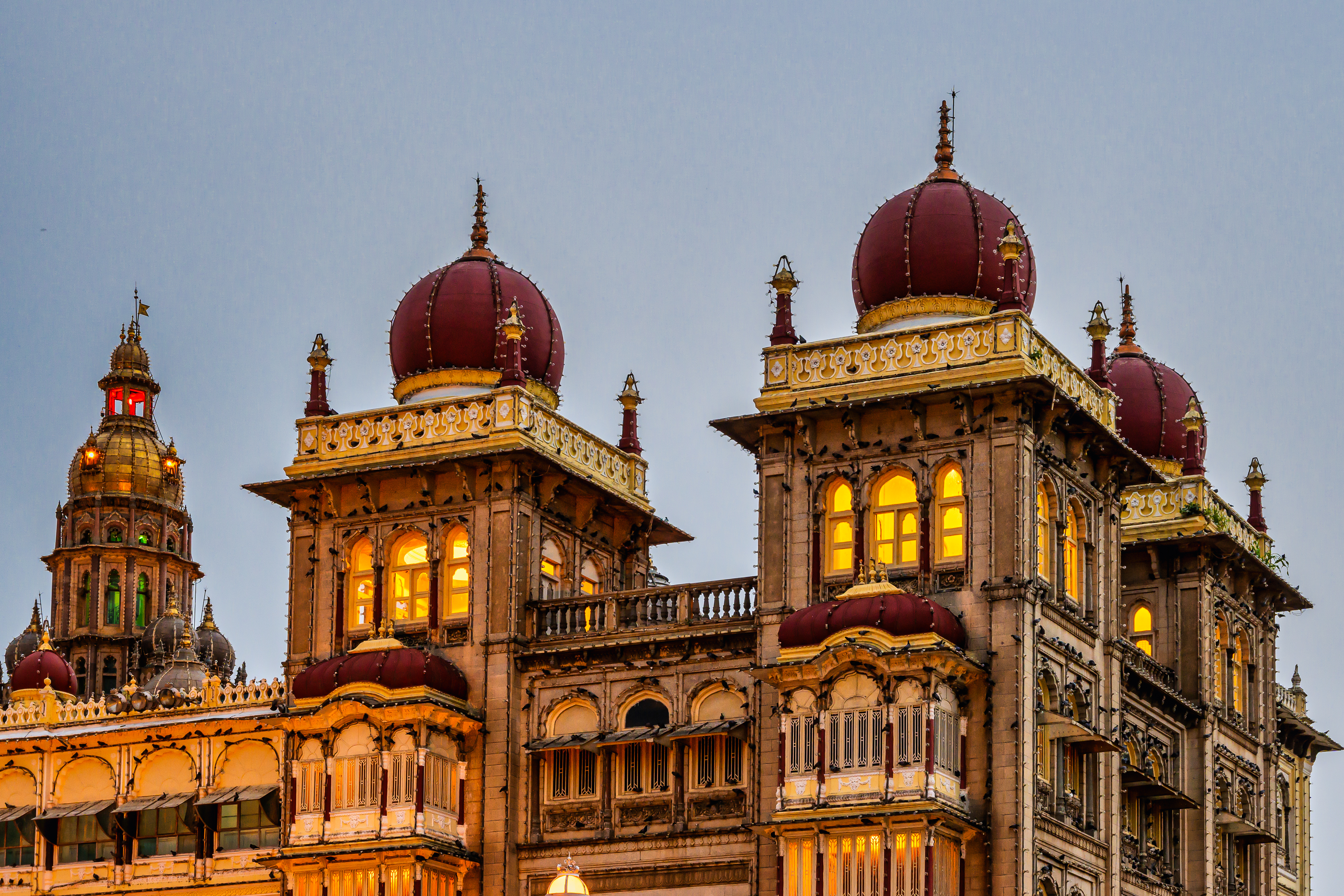
At 50 mm, f/8

== See also ==
- Nikon Z-mount
