= Nikon Zfc =

2021 APS-C mirrorless camera

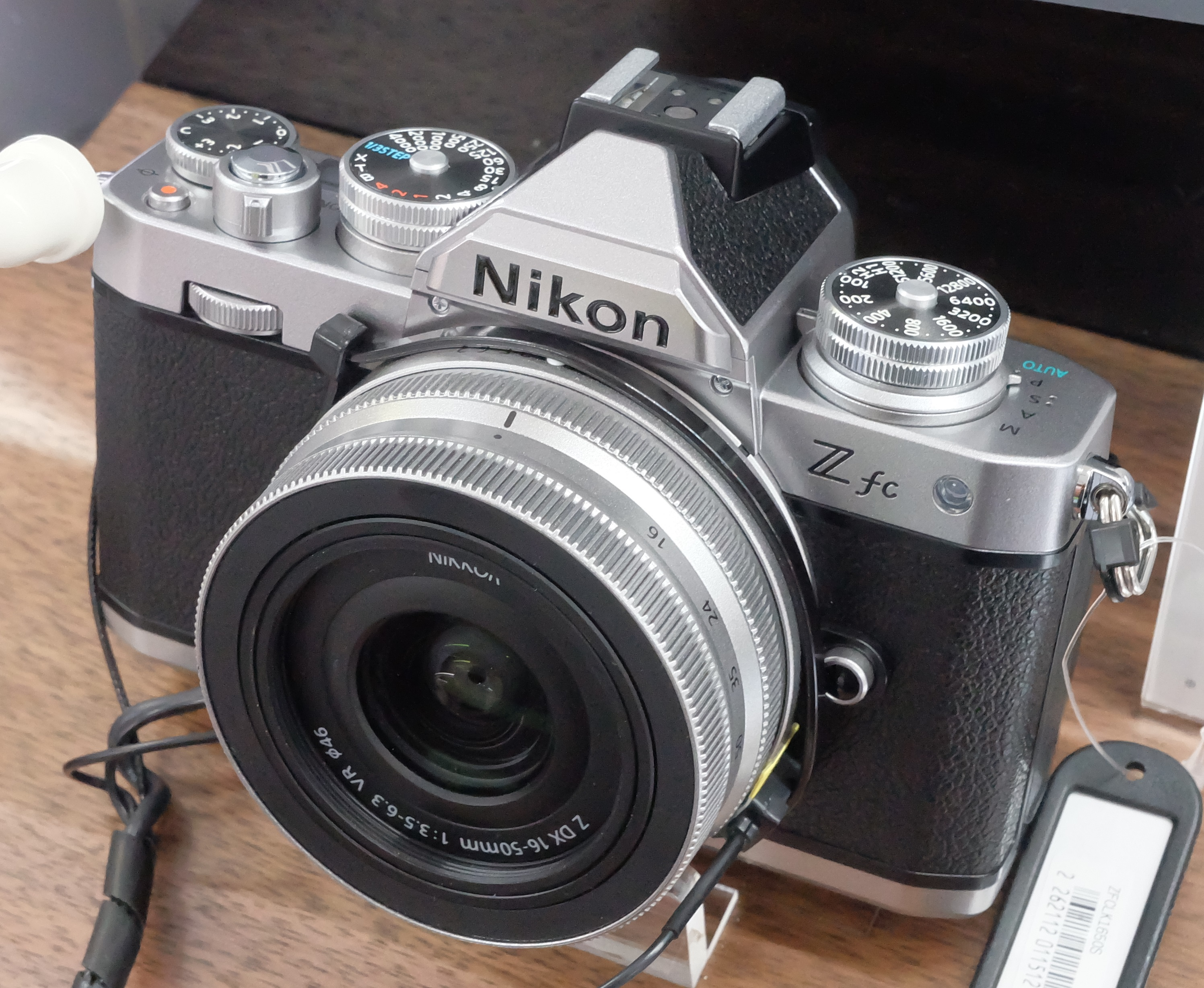
- Zfc + NIKKOR Z DX 16-50mm f/3.5-6.3 VR SL (silver)

Overview
- Maker: Nikon
- Type: Mirrorless interchangeable lens camera
- Released: July 23, 2021; 5 years ago

Lens
- Lens mount: Nikon Z-mount

Sensor/medium
- Sensor type: CMOS sensor
- Sensor size: 23.5 mm × 15.7 mm APS-C (Nikon DX format)
- Sensor maker: Sony Semiconductor Manufacturing Corporation
- Maximum resolution: 5,568 × 3,712 (20.9 effective megapixels)
- Film speed: ISO 100–51200 (standard); ISO 100–204800 (expandable)
- Recording medium: 1 × SD (UHS-I)

Focusing
- Focus: Hybrid AF
- Focus areas: 209 points

Exposure/metering
- Exposure: TTL exposure metering
- Exposure modes: Programmed Auto [P] with flexible program; Shutter-Priority Auto [S]; Aperture-Priority Auto [A]; Manual [M]
- Exposure metering: TTL exposure metering

Flash
- Flash: Built-in: No; Hot shoe

Shutter
- Shutter: Electronically controlled vertical-travel focal-plane mechanical shutter, Electronic front-curtain shutter
- Shutter speeds: 30s – 1/4000s
- Continuous shooting: 5 fps / 11 fps (expand)

Viewfinder
- Viewfinder: XGA EVF (1280 × 960 pixels, 2360000 'dots')

Image processing
- Image processor: EXPEED 6

General
- Video recording: 4K UHD at 30p/25p/24p, Full HD at 120p/100p/60p/50p/30p/25p/24p
- LCD screen: 3.2-inch variangle TFT LCD with touchscreen, 1.04 million dots
- Battery: EN-EL25; EN-EL25a (requires FW update)
- Optional accessories: MC-N10 remote grip (fw. 1.40+)
- AV port(s): USB Type-C, HDMI Type-D
- Data port(s): IEEE 802.11b/g/n/a/ac/Wi-Fi, Bluetooth Low Energy
- Dimensions: 134.5×93.5×43.5 mm (5.30×3.68×1.71 in)
- Weight: 390 g (14 oz) (body only); 445 g (includes battery)
- Latest firmware: 1.81 / 2 June 2026; 5 months ago
- Made in: Thailand

Chronology
- Predecessor: Nikon Z50
- Successor: Nikon Zf

The Nikon Zfc, announced on 29 June 2021 and released in July 2021, is a mirrorless interchangeable-lens camera with the Nikon Z-mount with a MSRP of $960 body, in the US.

It is based on the DX-format Nikon Z50 and has a classic design with control dials, similar to the Nikon FM2, an F-mount film camera launched in 1982. The body is made from magnesium alloy and carbon composite materials. The Zfc launched with a silver body and six premium exterior colors, but as of 2025, the Zfc has 26 styles available: a silver body that can be customized with 12 premium exterior colors (white, mint green, coral pink, amber brown, natural grey, sand beige, midnight grey, chalk blue, mustard yellow, crimson red, walnut brown, olive green) and a "Black Edition" with a black body with the same premium exterior options, with which Nikon also announced the Nikkor Z 40mm ƒ/2 SE lens (Special Edition) in November 2022. The set includes a Nikkor Z 28mm ƒ/2.8 lens (Special Edition) designed to match the body. The silver body is also distributed in a bundle with a silver version of Nikkor Z DX 16-50mm f/3.5-6.3 VR (SL).

On 12 September 2024, Nikon announced four "HERALBONY" limited editions of the Zfc, featuring designs created by neurodiverse artists. Nikon and HERALBONY selected four works of art of more than 2,000 pieces in the HERALBONY licensed collection. The selected artworks are "Yurinoyoakeri" by Masaharu Honda, "Cone Flower" by Masahiro Fukui, "Joyful Time" by Teppei Kasahara and "Samba" by Momoko Eguchi.

The name "fc" is taken from the "f," which represents the fusion of Nikon's history and technology, and the "c," which represents the casual use of a camera with a classic design. On 2 July 2021, Nikon announced that the Zfc "may not be available by the launch date due to higher than expected reservations".

== Lenses ==
The Zfc uses the Nikon Z-mount, developed by Nikon for its mirrorless digital cameras.

Nikon F-mount lenses can be used, with various degrees of compatibility, via the Nikon FTZ (F-to-Z) and FTZ II mount adapters.

== Awards ==
The Zfc was awarded with the Camera Grand Prix 2022 Editors Choice R&D Award.

== Gallery ==
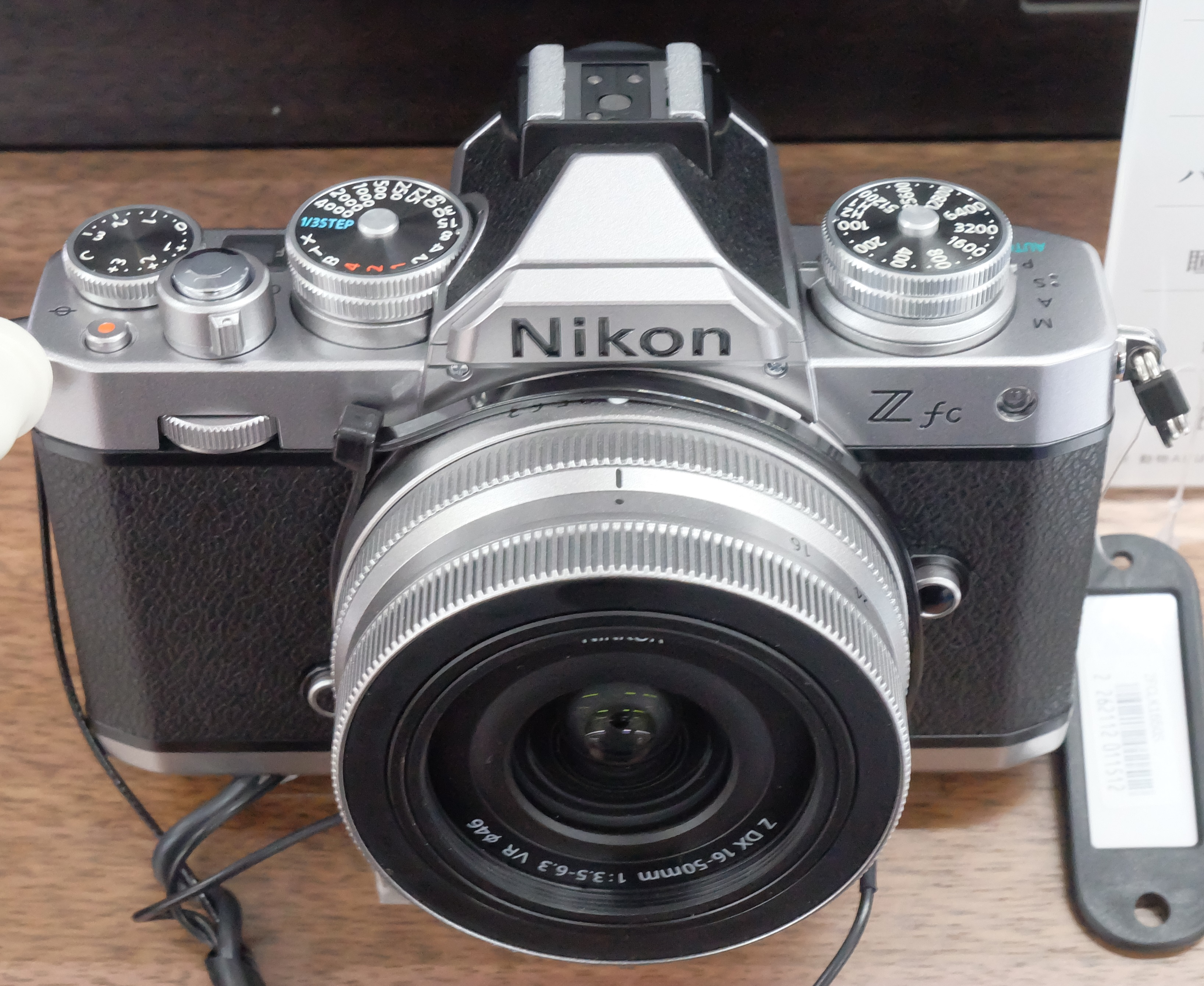

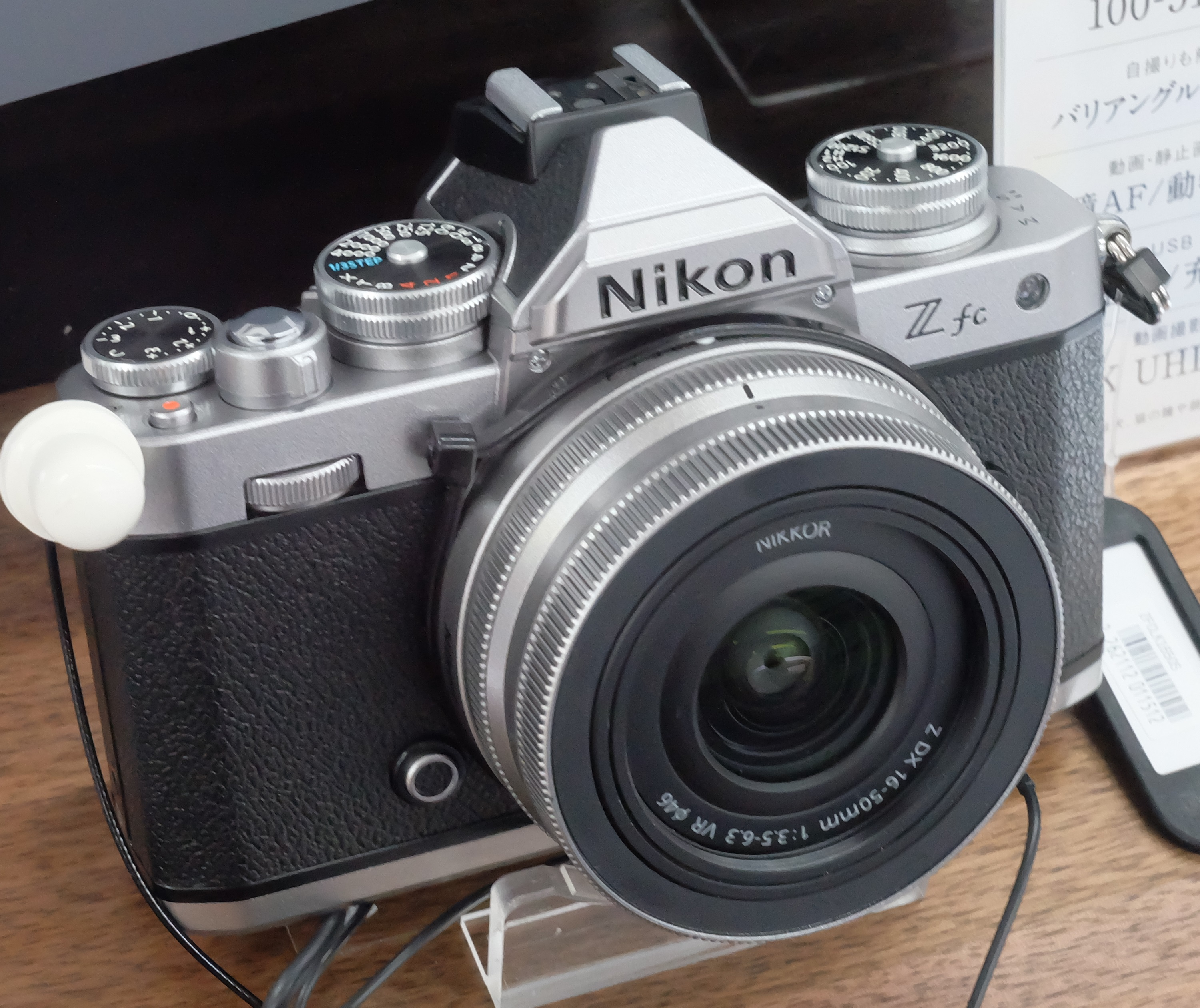

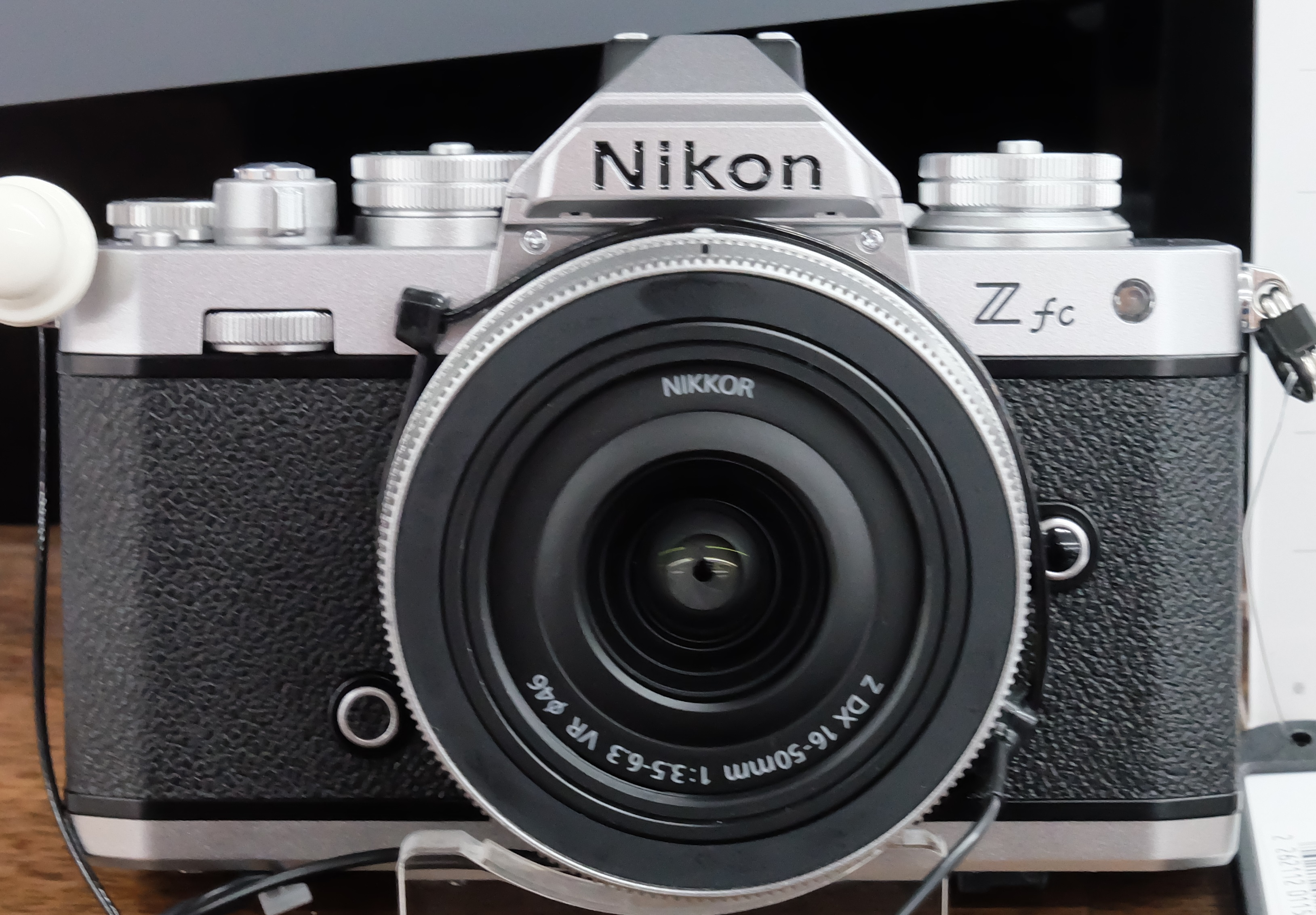

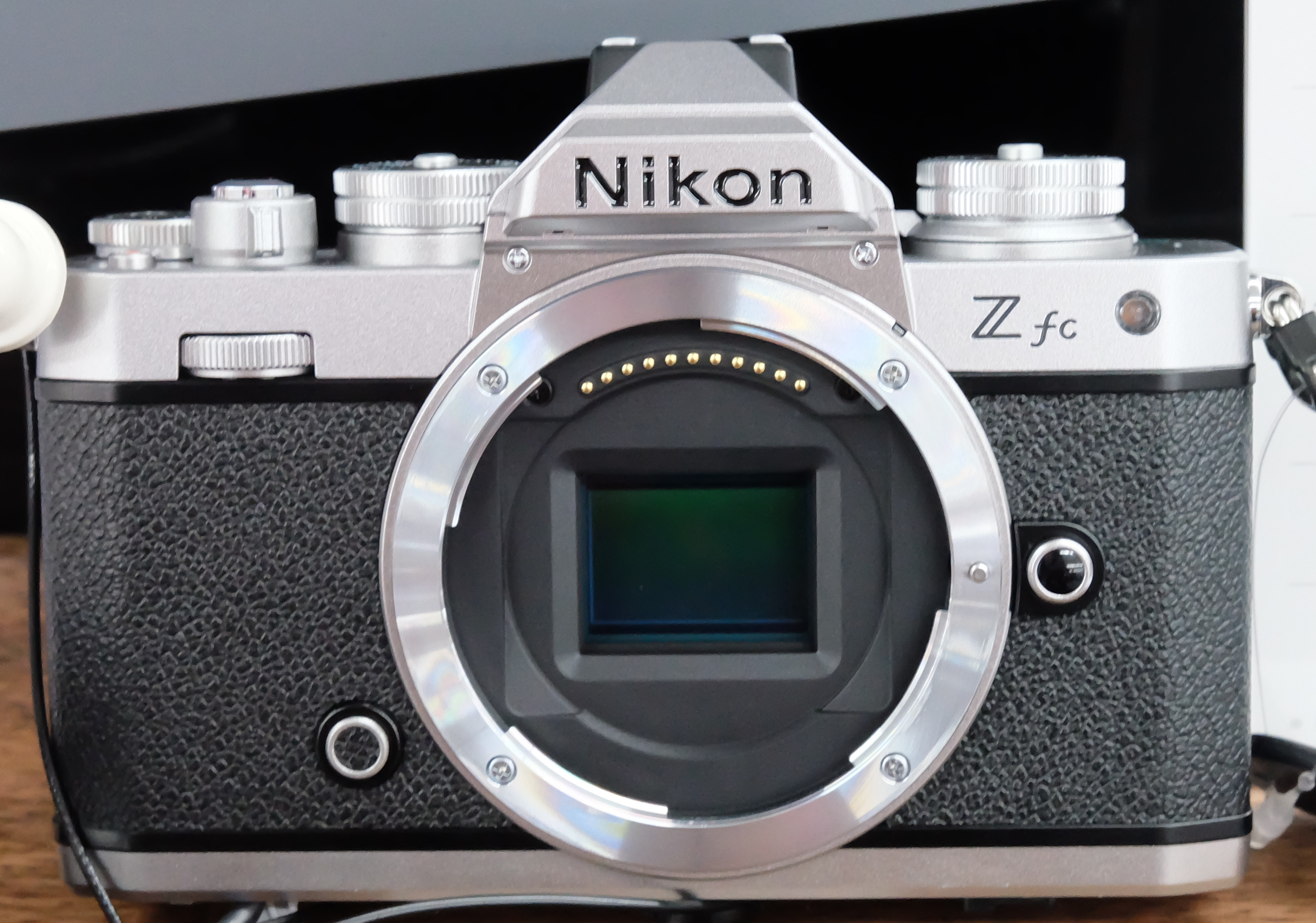

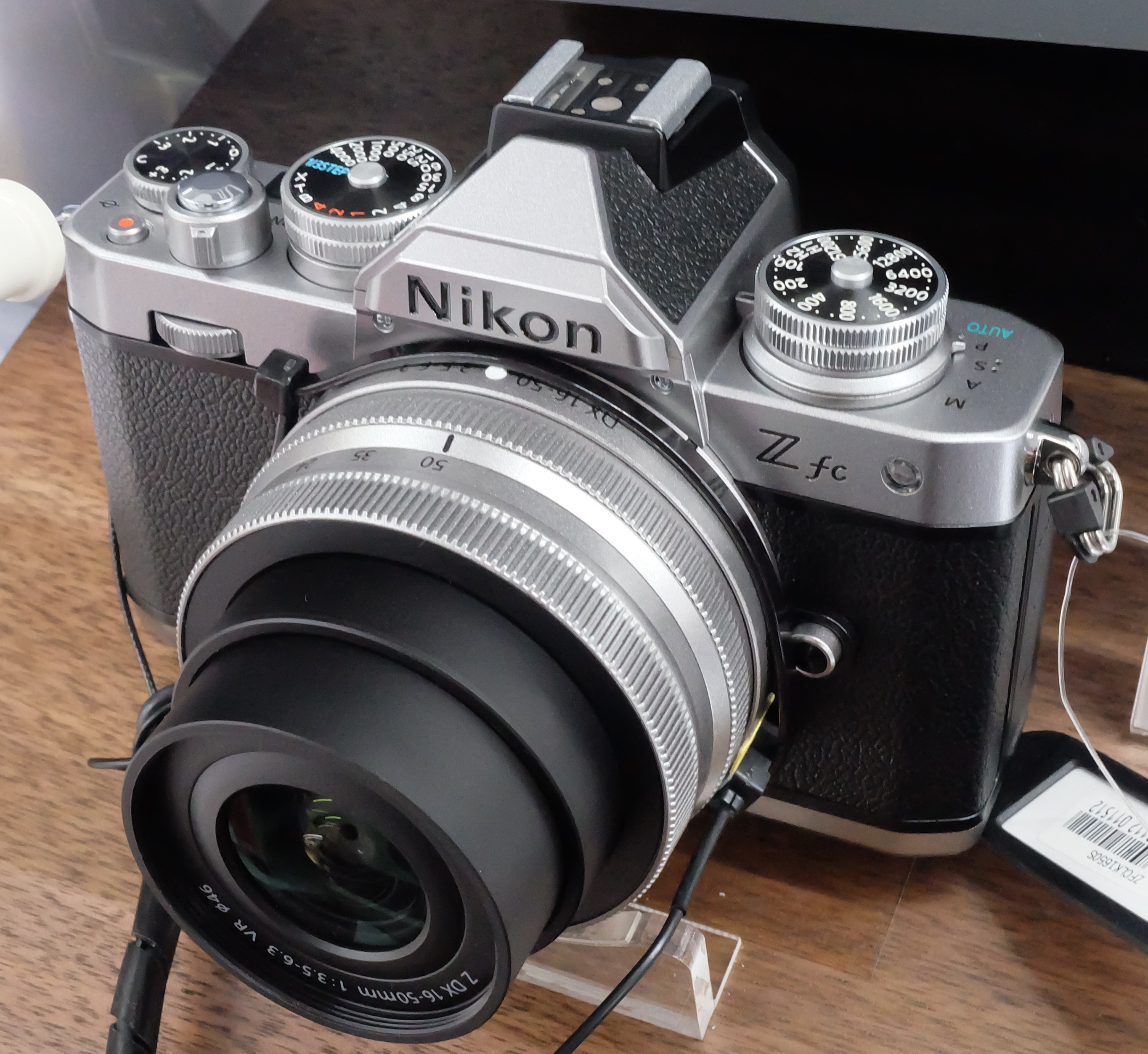

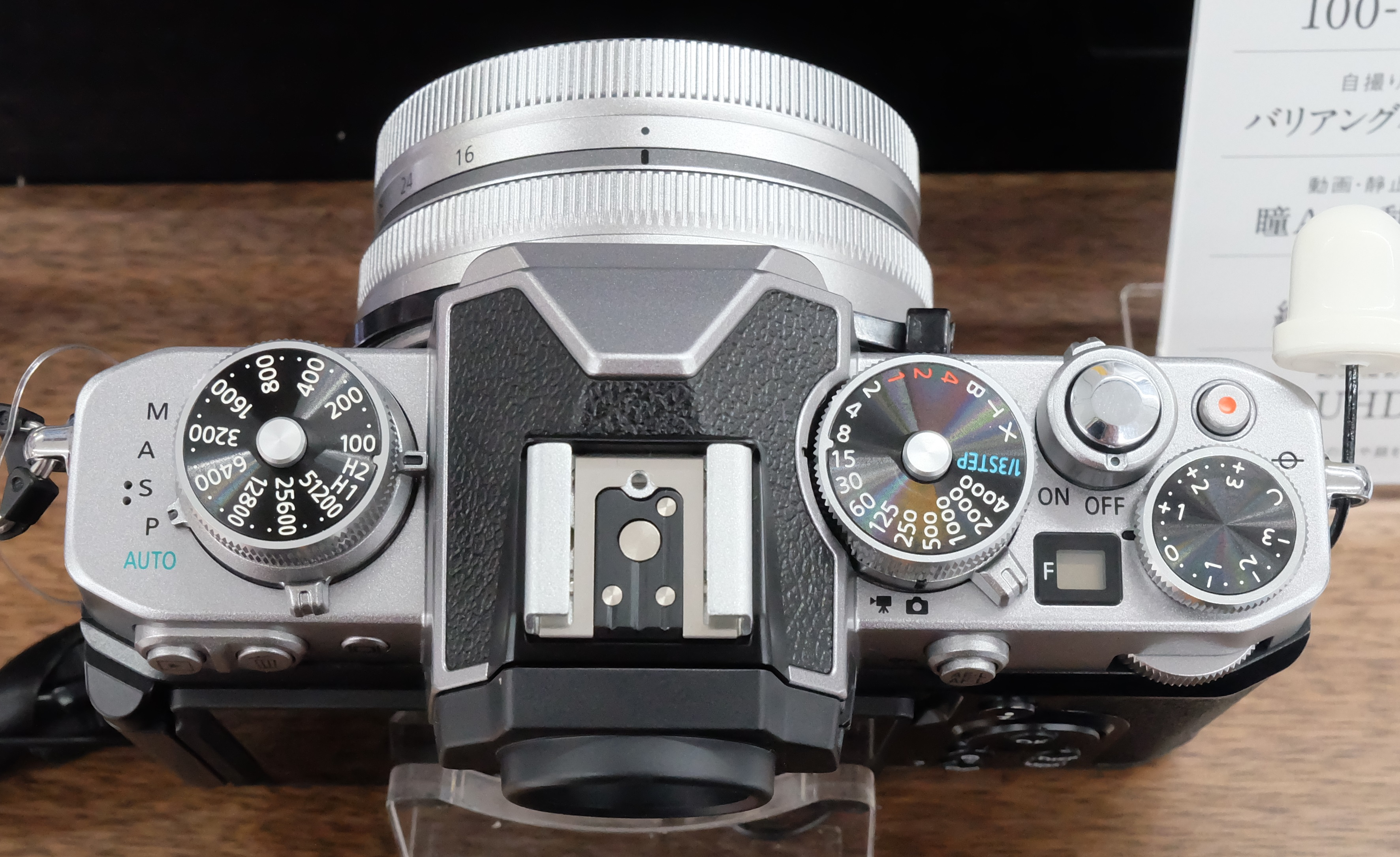

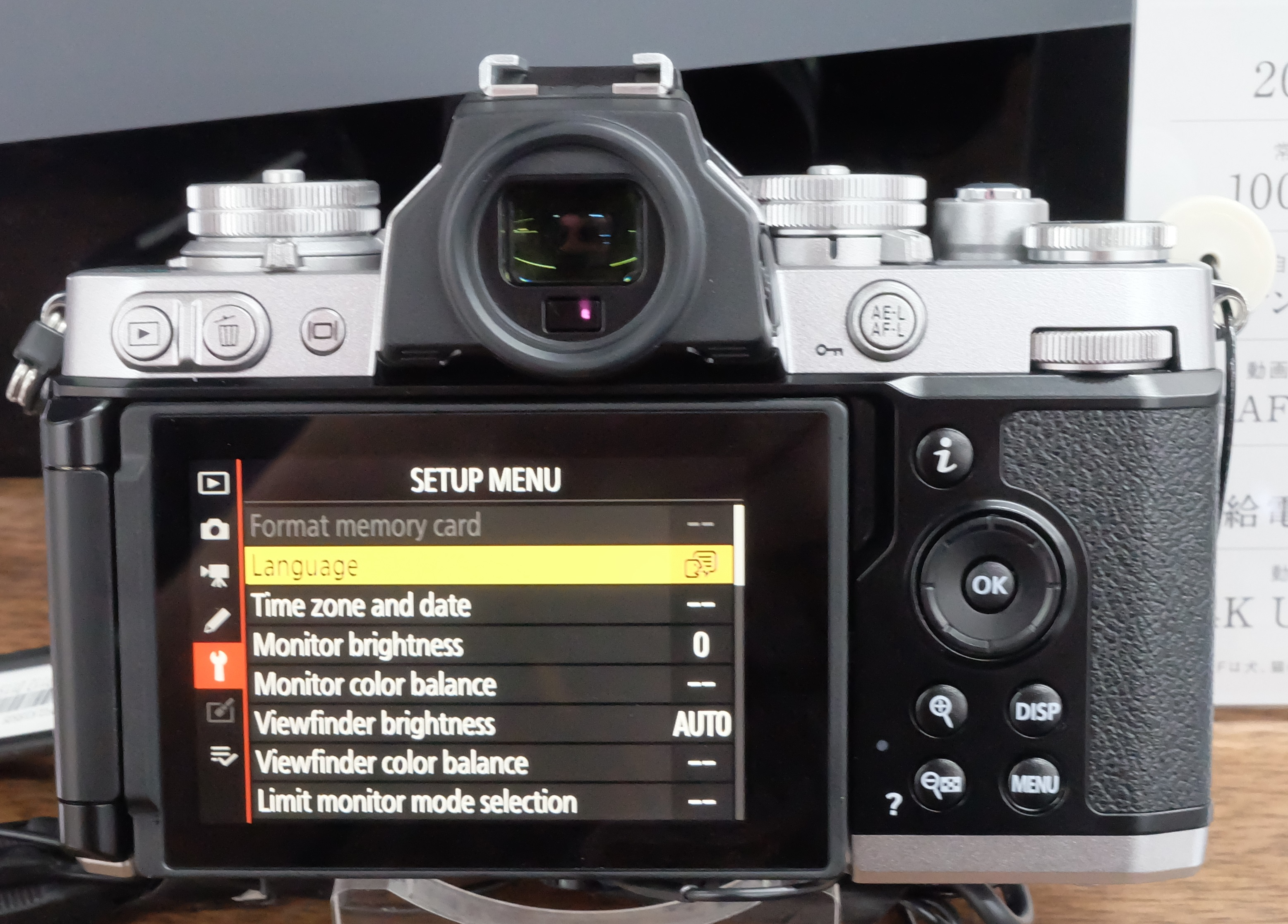

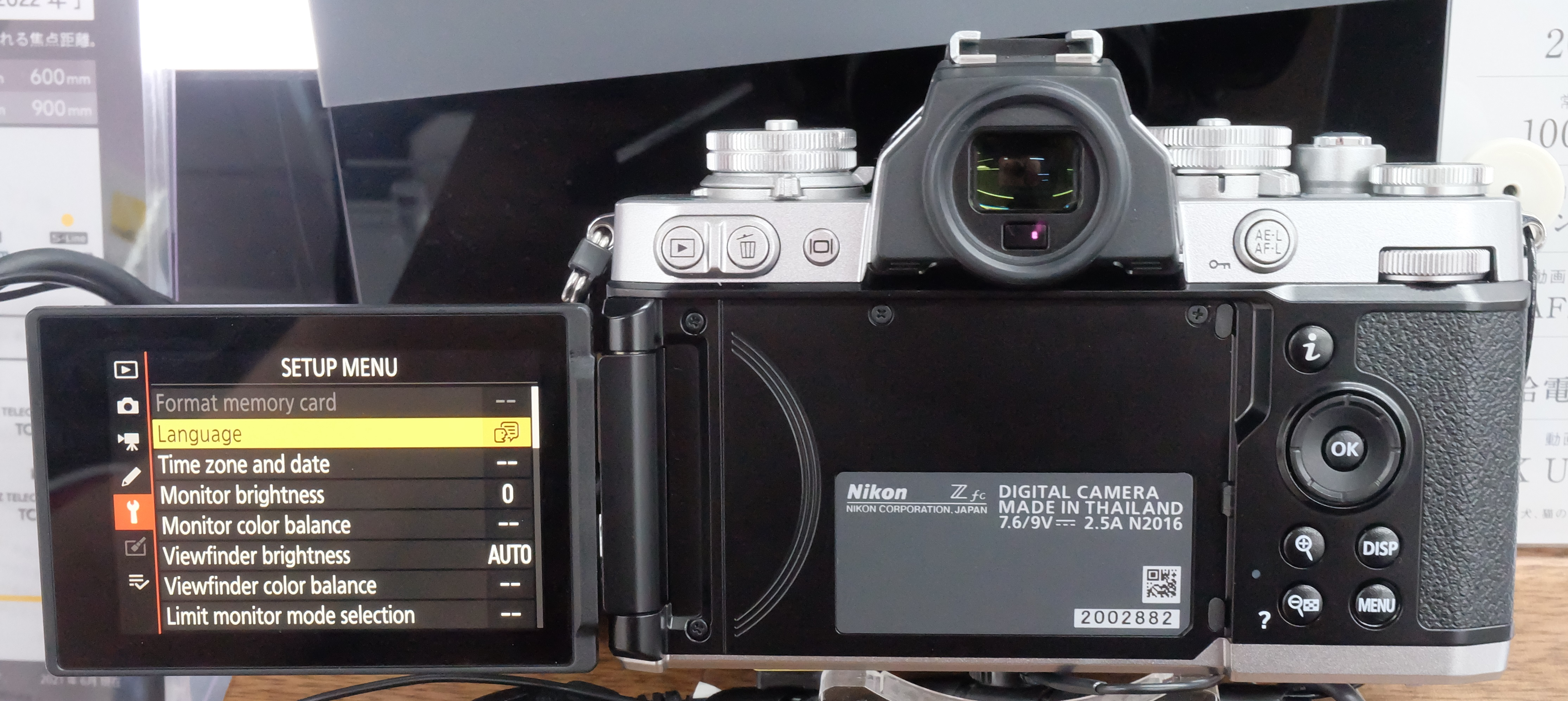

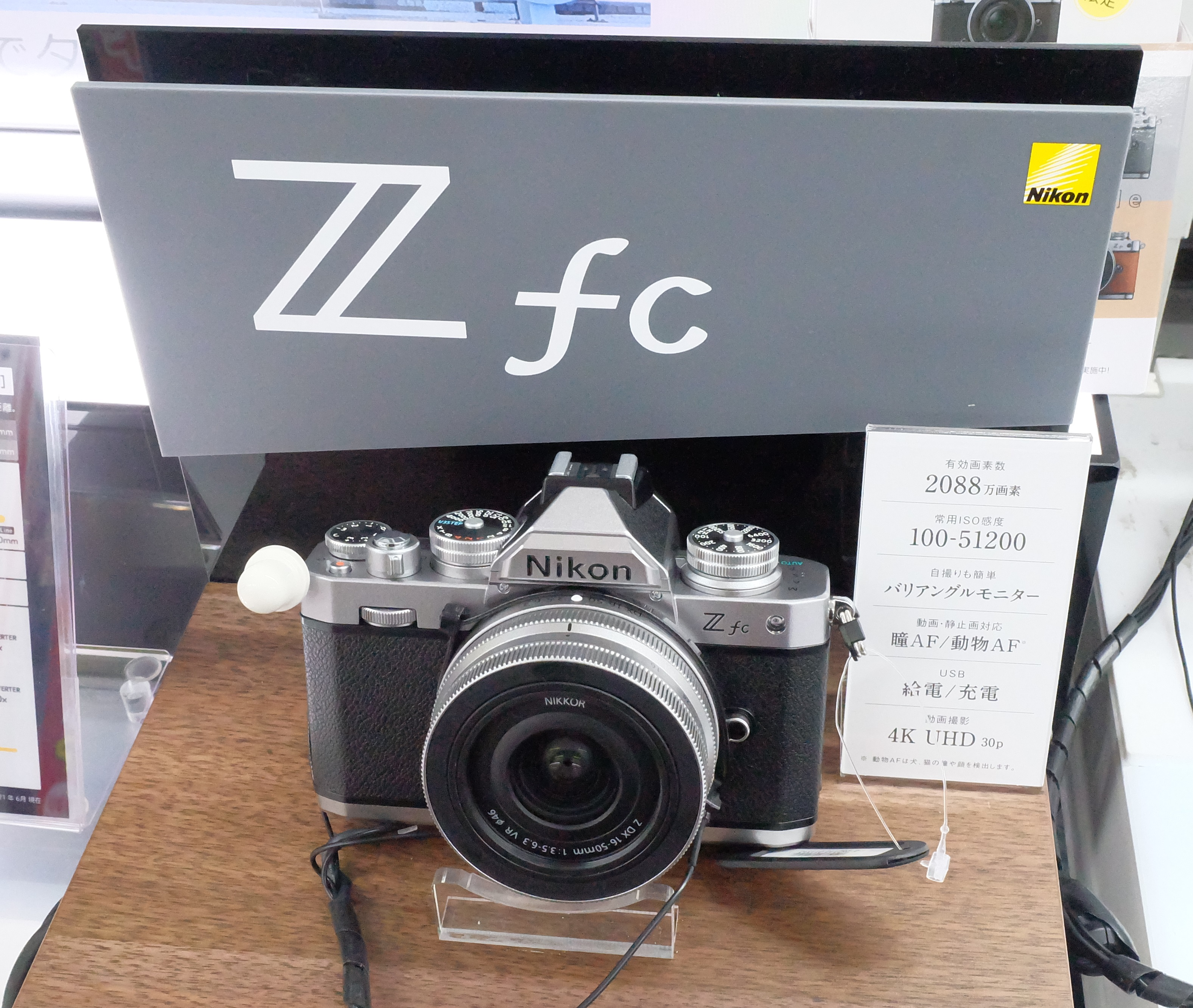

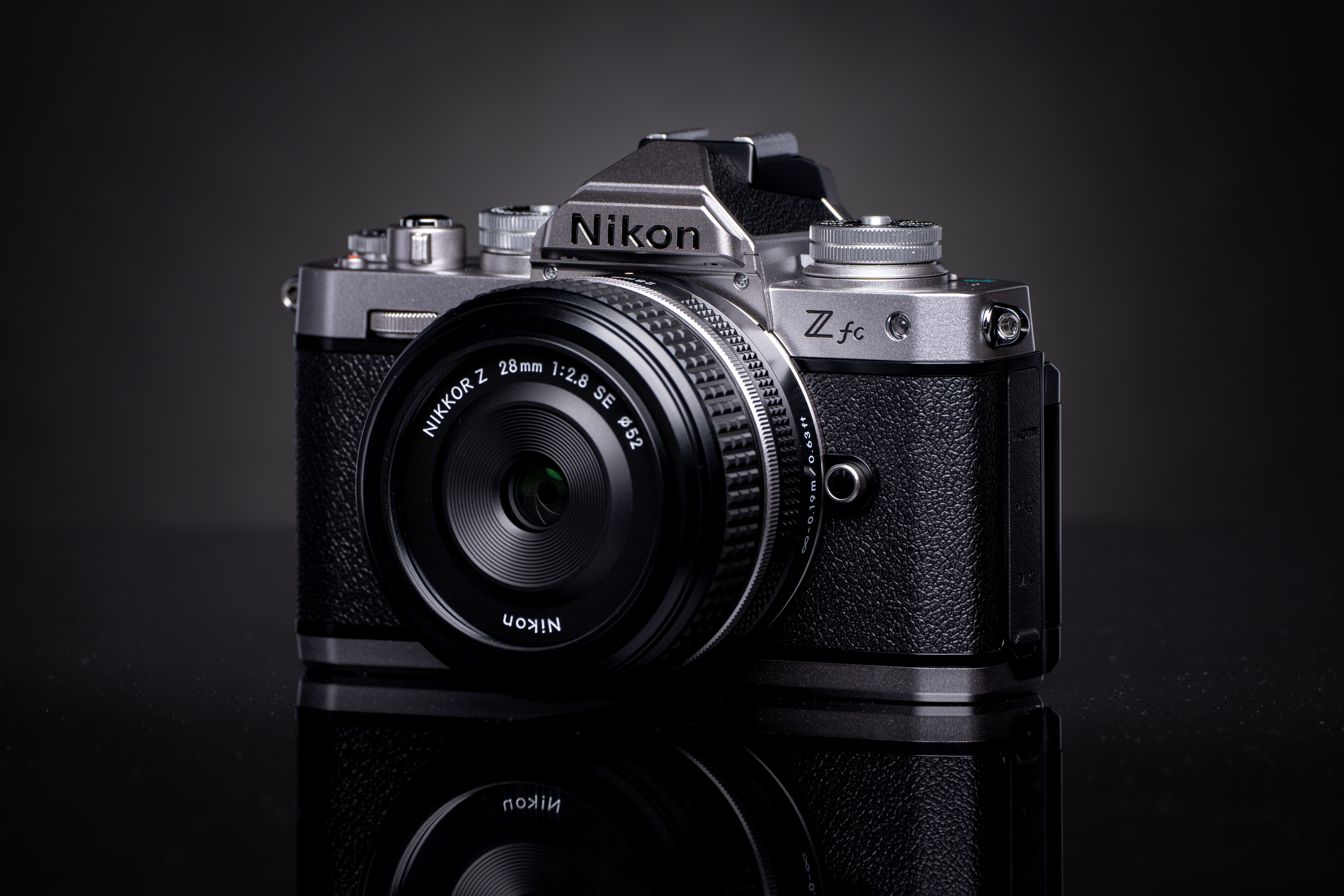
Zfc + NIKKOR Z 28 mm f/2.8 SE

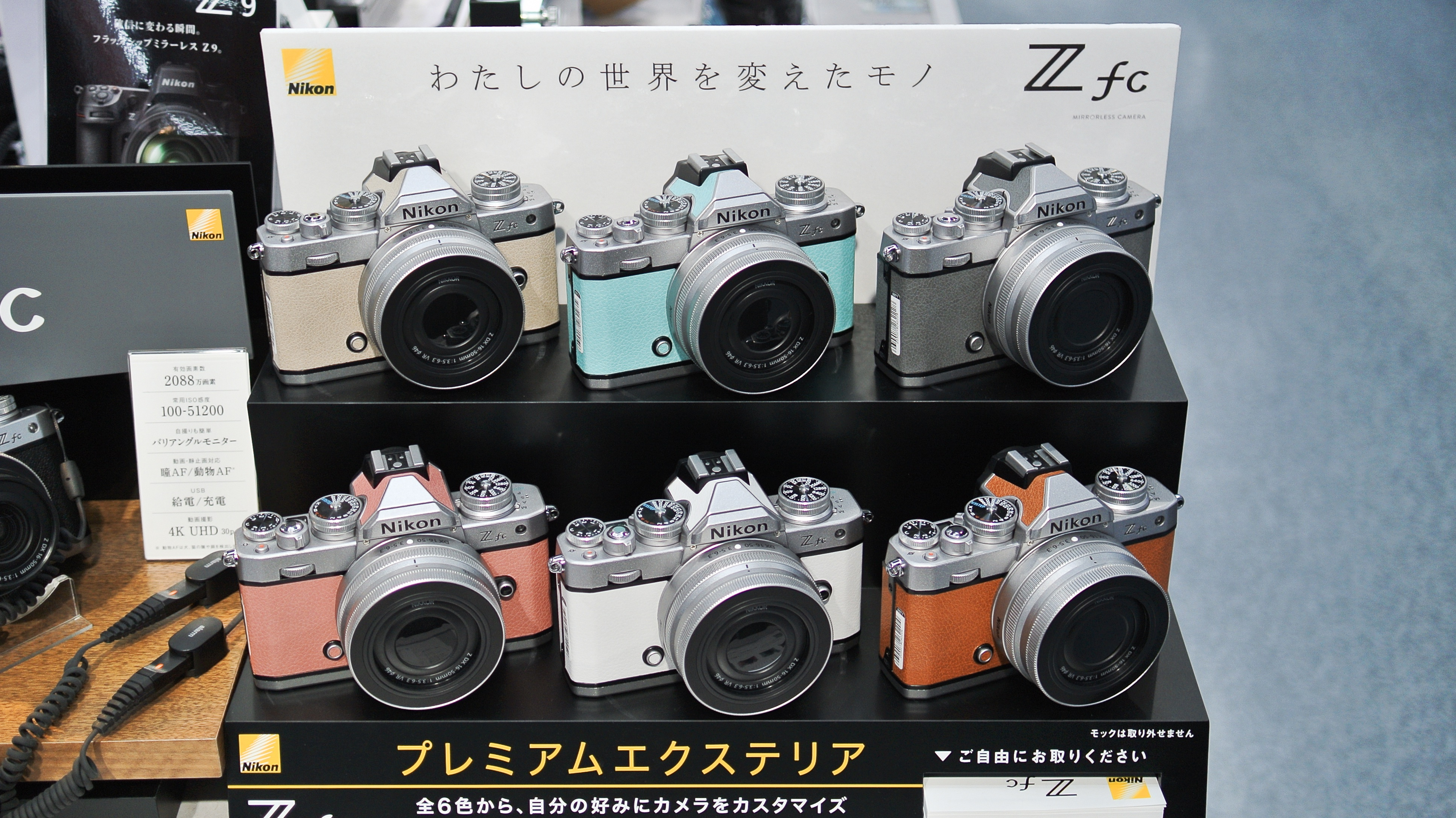
Silver Zfc in various colors (top fltr: Sand Beige, Mint Green, Natural Grey; bottom: Coral Pink, White, Amber Brown)

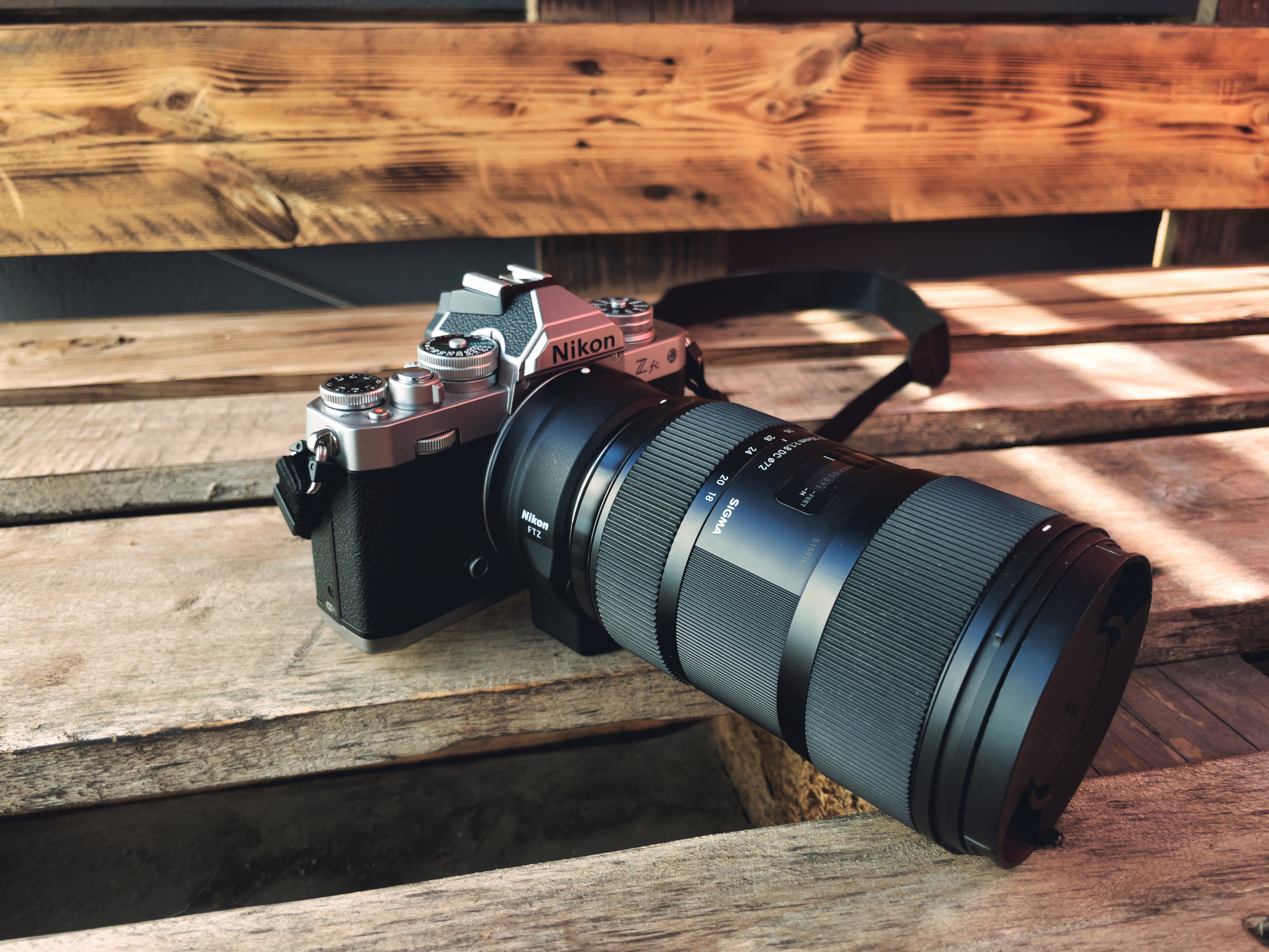
Zfc + Sigma 18-35 mm f/1.8 F-mount lens (with FTZ adapter)

== Marketing slogans ==
When the Zfc was launched, Nikon used the following marketing slogans:

- English: “Classic. Tactile. Modern."
- Japanese: "わたしの世界を変えたモノ" ("The thing that changed my world")

== See also ==
- Nikon Df
- Nikon Zf
- List of retro-style digital cameras

Sensor	Class	2018	2019	2020	2021	2022	2023	2024	2025	2026
FX (Full-frame)	Flagship					^{8K} Z9 ^{S}				
FX (Full-frame)	Flagship							^{8K} Z8 ^{S}		
FX (Full-frame)	Professional		^{4K} Z7 ^{S}		^{4K} Z7Ⅱ ^{S}					
FX (Full-frame)	Professional		^{4K} Z6 ^{S}		^{4K} Z6Ⅱ ^{S}				^{6K} Z6Ⅲ ^{S}	
FX (Full-frame)	Cinema									^{6K} ZR ^{S}
FX (Full-frame)	Enthusiast							^{4K} Zf ^{S}		
FX (Full-frame)	Enthusiast				^{4K} Z5 ^{S}					^{4K} Z5Ⅱ ^{S}
FX (Full-frame)	Entry-level									^{4K} Z5ⅡC ^{S}
DX (APS-C)	Enthusiast								^{4K} Z50Ⅱ	
DX (APS-C)	Enthusiast					^{4K} Zfc				
DX (APS-C)	Prosumer			^{4K} Z50						
DX (APS-C)	Entry-level						^{4K} Z30			
Sensor	Class									
Sensor	Class	2018	2019	2020	2021	2022	2023	2024	2025	2026
