= Nikon Z50II =

2024 APS-C mirrorless interchangeable-lens camera

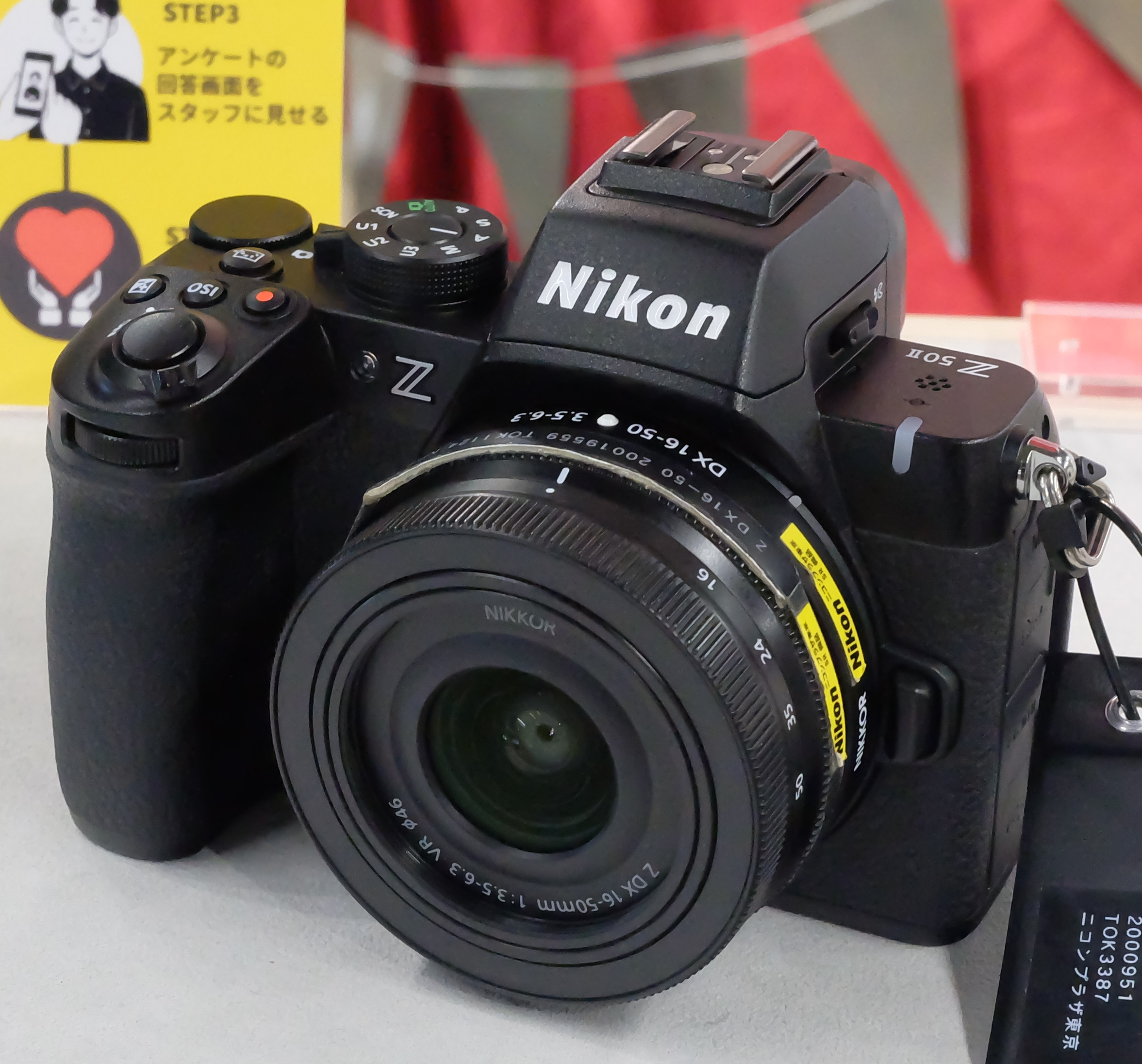
- Nikon Z50II + NIKKOR Z DX 16-50mm f/3.5–6.3 VR

Overview
- Maker: Nikon
- Type: Mirrorless interchangeable lens camera
- Released: November 21, 2024; 23 months ago
- Intro price: US$906.95

Lens
- Lens mount: Nikon Z-mount

Sensor/medium
- Sensor type: BSI-CMOS Sensor
- Sensor size: APS-C (23.5 × 15.7 mm); Nikon DX format
- Maximum resolution: 5,568 × 3,712 (20.9 effective megapixels)
- Film speed: ISO 100–51200 (standard); ISO 100–204800 (expandable)
- Recording medium: 1 × SD (UHS-II)

Focusing
- Focus: Single-servo AF (AF-S); Continuous-servo AF (AF-C); Auto-servo (A); Manual focus; Full-time AF (AF-F; only available in video mode)
- Focus modes: Pinpoint AF; Single-point AF; Dynamic-area AF (S, M, L); Wide-area AF (S, L, C1, C2)^{s}; 3D-Tracking^{s} (Note: 3D-Tracking is an advanced autofocus mode. When selected, it locks onto a subject by analyzing its shape, contrast, and color. Once locked, this allows the camera to follow it across the frame as either the subject moves or your framing changes.); Auto-area AF^{s}; ^{s} supports Subject Detection
- Focus areas: 209 points (single-point AF} 231 points (automatic AF)
- Focus bracketing: 2-300 frames, variable step width

Exposure/metering
- Exposure: TTL exposure metering
- Exposure bracketing: 3 or 5 frames up to 3 EV in 1/3 or 1/2 steps
- Exposure modes: Programmed Auto [P] with flexible program; Shutter-Priority Auto [S]; Aperture-Priority Auto [A]; Manual [M]; Scene Modes [SCN]^{s} ^{s} list of scene modes in article text
- Exposure metering: TTL metering using camera image sensor; -4 to +17 EV, ISO 100
- Metering modes: Matrix metering; Center-weighted metering; Spot metering; Highlight-weighted metering

Flash
- Flash: Built-in: internal guidenumber 7 Hot shoe
- Flash exposure compensation: -3 to +1 EV in 1/3 or 1/2 steps
- Flash synchronization: 1/250 s
- Flash bracketing: 3 or 5 frames up to 3 EV in 1/3 or 1/2 steps

Shutter
- Shutter: Electronically controlled vertical-travel focal-plane mechanical shutter, Electronic front-curtain shutter
- Shutter speeds: 30–1/4000 s and bulb
- Continuous shooting: 1-30 fps (selectable)

Viewfinder
- Electronic viewfinder: 0.39" (1 cm) OLED, 2.36m dots (XGA) up to 1000 nits brightness
- Viewfinder magnification: 0.67× (full-frame)
- Frame coverage: 100%

Image processing
- Image processor: EXPEED 7
- White balance: Auto (3 variants); natural light auto; direct sunlight; cloudy; shade; incandescent; fluorescent (3 variants); flash; manual white point (2500‑10000 K); preset manual (6 variants)
- WB bracketing: 3 or 5 frames up to 3 EV in 1/3 or 1/2 steps

General
- Video recording: 4K UHD at 60/50/30/25/24p; Full HD at 120/100/60/50/30/25/24p
- LCD screen: 3.2-inch free-angle TFT LCD with touchscreen, 1.04 million dots
- Battery: EN-EL25a; USB-C PD rechargeable (EN-EL25 usable with lower battery life)
- Optional accessories: MC-N10 remote grip MC-DC3 wired remote ML-L7 Bluetooth remote MH-32 battery charger
- AV ports: USB-C, HDMI Type-D, 3.5 mm stereo microphone jack, 3.5 mm stereo headphone jack
- Data port(s): IEEE 802.11b/g/n/a/ac/Wi-Fi, Bluetooth 5.0, Bluetooth Low Energy
- Dimensions: 126.5×96.8×66.5 mm (4.98×3.81×2.62 in)
- Weight: 495 g (17 oz) (body only); 550 g (including battery and SD card)
- Latest firmware: 1.11 / 5 August 2026; 3 months ago
- Made in: Thailand

Chronology
- Replaced: Nikon Z50
- Predecessor: Nikon Z50

The Nikon Z50II is an APS-C mirrorless interchangeable-lens camera (1.5x APS crop) announced by Nikon on November 7, 2024. It is the successor to the Nikon Z50 released in 2019, becoming the fourth crop-sensor Z-mount body and the thirteenth Z-mount camera body.

== Features ==
=== Image sensor ===
The Z50II features an effective 20.9-megapixel BSI CMOS sensor, the same as on the Z50. It is a DX (i.e., crop-sensor) format. It does not include built-in sensor cleaning, nor is IBIS present, although Vibration Reduction on some Nikkor and third-party lenses is provided. Similar to the Z50, the Z50II does not have an anti-aliasing (AA) filter.

=== Image processor ===
The Z50II uses the EXPEED 7 image processor, which is also used in the Nikon Z9, Z8, Zf, Z6III, Z5II, ZR, and Z5IIC. This provides an improvement of 10 times over the image processing speed of the EXPEED 6 predecessor, which was used in the original Z50.

=== Lenses ===
The Z50II uses the Nikon Z-mount, developed by Nikon for its mirrorless digital cameras.

Nikon F-mount lenses can be used, with various degrees of compatibility, via the Nikon FTZ (F-to-Z) and FTZ II mount adapters.

=== Video capability ===
For videographers, the Z50II supports UHD 4K video recording at 60 frames per second (with a 1.5x crop), including the ability to do slow motion 4K. Additionally, it offers 4K recording at 30 frames per second, oversampled from 5.6K. It is Nikon's first DX camera to support Hi-res zoom, HLG, N-Log, and 10-bit H.265. Supported LUTs include both the standard Nikon LUT as well as the RED LUT. It supports waveform monitoring and had a 3.5 mm headphone monitoring jack added. The camera includes customizable picture profiles to aid in achieving professional-grade video quality. A tally light has also been added to aid in video recording, showing both the subject and the videographer that recording is occurring. The maximum video recording duration has been increased from the Z50's 30 minutes to over 2 hours.

For stereo recording, there is a pair of microphones on the top, along with a miniplug on the left supporting an external stereo microphone connection. For playback, there is a speaker on the top, along with a miniplug on the left for an external stereo headphone.

For streaming applications, the Z50II directly supports both UVC and UAC streaming using its USB-C port. This allows it to be used as a webcam without requiring special software or drivers.

Stills can be made from individual frames of a video. A single still can be created, or a series of stills can be created from a section of video footage.

=== Autofocus and subject detection ===
The Z50II's 209 point autofocus (AF) system is highly effective in recognizing and focusing on a variety of subjects, including people, animals, birds, vehicles, and airplanes. The eye-detection AF ensures sharp focus on human eyes, which is particularly beneficial for portrait photography. The autofocus is a hybrid phase-detection/contrast AF with AF assist. Once focus is achieved, it is possible to change to 3D-tracking to maintain a focus lock on a moving object, such as a bird. When using Auto-area AF mode, 231 points of detection are used.

It is the first Nikon Z camera with the "Product review mode" autofocus setting, which when enabled, prioritizes subjects moved into the foreground in the selected frame area, even if, for example, the main autofocus mode is set to face detection at a further distance.

It is the first Nikon DX format camera to support pre-release capture. This allows pre-recording of a number of images for up to one second before the shutter is fully depressed, along with a number of images after. This aids in capturing a picture of a fast-moving, unpredictable subject, such as a snake's tongue, a baby's smile, or a lightning bolt.

Multiple types of autobracketing are supported, including exposure, white balance, flash, and active d-lighting. It allows the user to set the number of shots and the increment.

Using its focus shift shooting function, the Z50II can automatically shoot a sequence of images at varying focus distances that can later be combined in computer focus stacking software, allowing, for example, close-ups with great depth of field.

In addition to the "standard" PASM exposure modes, "Scene Modes" are supported via selecting SCN on the Mode dial. Each scene mode uses a pre-defined combination of picture control, sharpness, contrast, brightness, saturation, hue, and white balance. The supported scenes are: portrait, landscape, child, sports, close up, night portrait, night landscape, party/indoor, beach/snow, sunset, dusk/dawn, pet portrait, candlelight, blossom, autumn colors, and food.

=== Connectivity and smart features ===
The Z50II is equipped with advanced connectivity options, including Wi-Fi, Bluetooth, and Bluetooth Low Energy, facilitating seamless integration with smart devices. This allows for remote camera control, instant sharing of images over a smartphone, and GPS information (from the smart device) inclusion in Exif data.

The camera also has a USB-C port supporting USB 3.1 for faster data transfer and in-camera charging. Integration with Nikon's Imaging Cloud further enhances workflow efficiency by enabling easy image transfer, storage, and sharing.

An HDMI Type-D (micro) port is provided to allow still and video output to an external monitor, such as a TV.

=== New Picture Control feature ===
The Z50II is the first Nikon camera with a dedicated picture control button added. As shipped, this gives access to 31 built-in preset imaging recipes, i.e., pre-defined color and tone profiles, allowing for more creative shooting. The Flexible Color Picture Control feature allows users to create additional Picture Control profiles with HSL and color grading, modify the provided Picture Control settings, and download recipes created by others. The Flexible Color Picture Control, or normal Picture Control, can now be made through Nikon's NX Studio software instead of its Picture Control Utility 2. The picture controls are used on both stills and videos. For JPEGs and video, the picture control setting are permanently applied to the final stored JPEG or video file. For RAW Files, the raw sensor data stays intact with full color and dynamic range, but the embedded JPEG preview and camera screen/histogram use the picture control settings.

=== Control customization ===
Many Z50II controls can be customized to allow quick access to most of the numerous functions found in the camera's menus and related items, including:

- U1/U2/U3 settings on the Mode dial are programmable settings that can be preset to user-selected combinations of most shooting settings, such as exposure mode, release mode, resolution, white balance, ISO, and AF mode, along with modified values for most shooting, video, and custom menu items.
- FN1/FN2 buttons can be set to provide access to most of the menu items, with separate definitions for stills, video, and playback.
- i-Button can provide access to 12 user-selected functions, with separate definitions for stills and video, along with specific context-sensitive functions during playback.
- The My Menu settings page can provide access to 20 user-selected functions, 7 without scrolling.
- Most of the buttons on the camera (11 of them) can be redefined to provide alternate functions, with separate definitions for stills, video, and playback. Additionally, three lens-specific buttons can be redefined.
- Picture Controls can be created, modified, and/or downloaded.

=== File formats (image quality) ===
File formats that the Z50II supports are:

- for photographs:
  - RAW (NEF) (always 14-bit)
  - JPEG (Fine, Normal, Basic)
  - HEIF (Fine, Normal, Basic)
  - RAW + JPEG
  - RAW + HEIF
- for videos:
  - MOV
  - MP4

Exif 2.32 data is stored in the image and video files.

=== Flash ===
For flash photography, the Z50II has both a pop-up flash and a hot shoe. Flash compensation is available from -3 to +1 EV (in adjustable step sizes).

To use the pop-up flash, the Flash Release switch is slid, which pops up the built-in flash. The pop-up flash has a guide number of approximately 7/22.

The hot shoe is suitable for attaching a flash unit (supports Nikon CLS (i-TTL)) and other compatible accessories. It does not have built-in wireless control (Commander-mode). External Nikon Speedlight flashes that can be set in the Flash Control menu item are: SB-300, SB-400, SB-500, and SB-5000.

Third-party flashes can be used on Z-mount cameras, including the Z50II, as long as they have the same basic hotshoe design; standards define the two pins required to trigger the flash. However, they won't be integrated into the Z50II's menus, and need to have the power adjusted manually and have the user be mindful of the maximum sync speed limits of the camera.

=== Battery and charging ===
The Z50II can be powered by both a custom battery and directly via a USB-C cable.

The Z50II uses the Nikon EN-EL25a lithium-ion battery. The battery is rechargeable in-camera via USB-C PD (USB Power Delivery), requiring 27 watts (9 volts at 3 amps), along with being rechargeable outside the camera using the external Nikon MH-32 charger. The Z50II’s CIPA rating with that battery is 230 shots using the electronic viewfinder and 250 with the monitor.

The EN-EL25 battery, used in the Z50, Z30, and Zfc, will also work in the Z50II, although with a slightly lower battery life.

=== Electronic viewfinder ===
The Z50II electronic viewfinder (EVF) is a 2.36m dot OLED panel (the same as the Z50), but can now be set twice as bright, going as high as 1000 nits. It has a diopter adjustment control, allowing an adjustment from –3 to +3. Based on settings of various menu options, it provides a real time view of the scene, showing the effects of exposure, white balance, and Picture Controls, along with numerous pieces of data, such as shooting information, focus position, and histogram.

There is proximity sensor under the viewfinder, nominally for detecting when an eye is viewing the scene using the EVF. Depending on settings, it automatically switches displays between the electronic viewfinder and the monitor, turning off the display of the other.

=== Monitor ===
The Z50II has a fully articulating (swings 180° outward and swivels 270°), 3.2-inch 1040K dot rear touch sensitive TFT LCD, allowing for live view of the camera’s output, focus selection, shutter release, scrolling of playback, and menu item selection and input. When rotated to be visible from in front of the camera for self-portraits and videos, a specialized set of controls is provided on-screen to allow the user easy access to self-timer, exposure compensation, and product review.

=== Remote control ===
The Z50II can be remotely controlled in multiple ways, using:

- the Nikon MC-N10 wired remote grip (using USB-C)
- the Nikon MC-DC3 wired remote control (using the headphone jack)
- the Nikon ML-L7 Bluetooth remote control
- the Nikon SnapBridge app (using Bluetooth and WiFi).

=== Recording media ===
The Z50II has a single, UHS-II compliant SD card slot, supporting SD, SDHC, and SDXC. A U3-rated, UHS-II compatible SD card is recommended to achieve a high rate of speed needed for stills and video.

=== Languages ===
The camera which is sold in the US has built-in support of multiple languages (English, Spanish, French, and Portuguese). The version of the camera sold in Japan only supports Japanese, although other languages can be added for a fee. With the first FW update, Russian was added for cameras sold in the Middle East region.

== Gallery ==
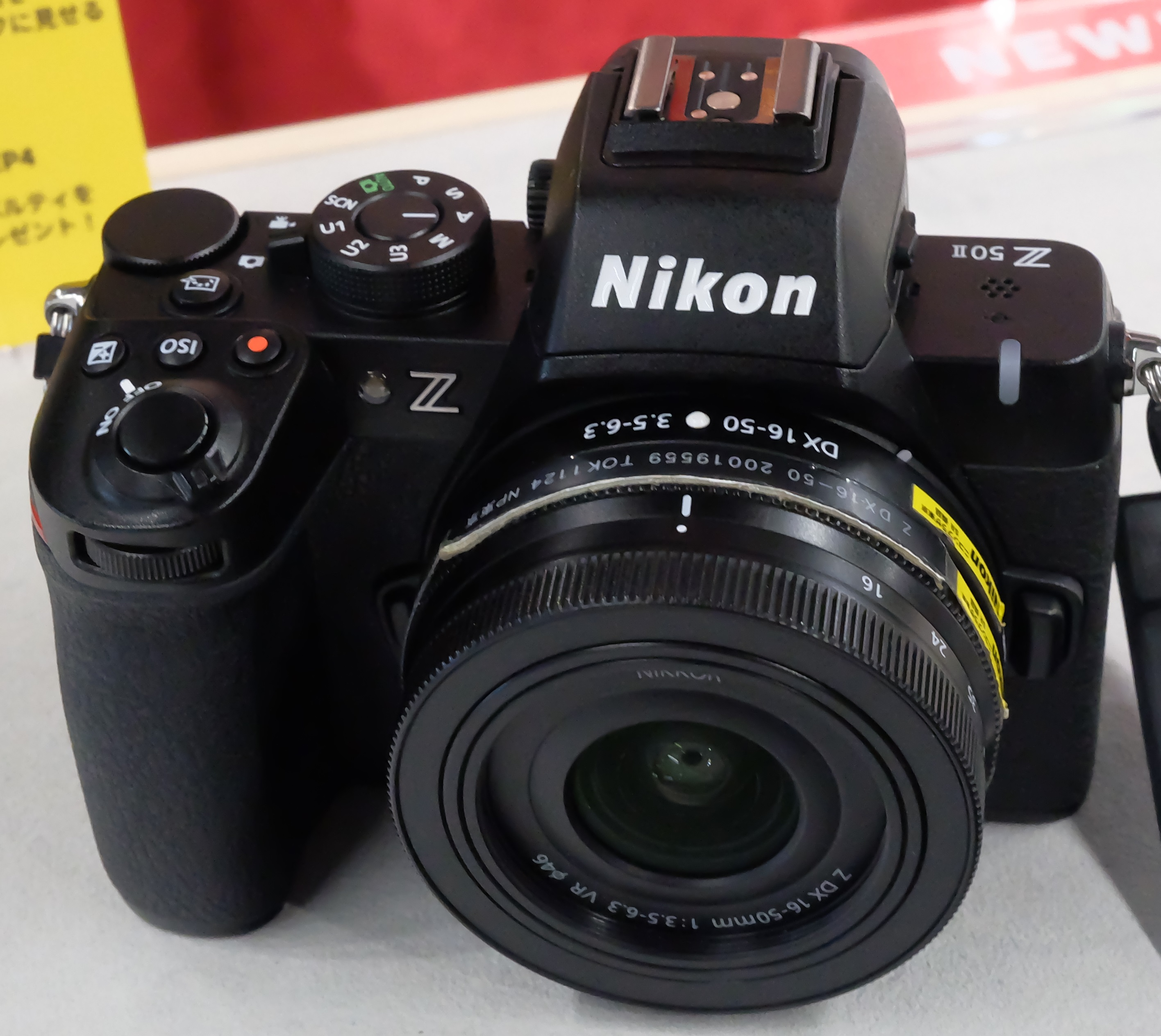
Z50II + Nikkor Z DX 16-50 mm f/3.5-6.3 VR

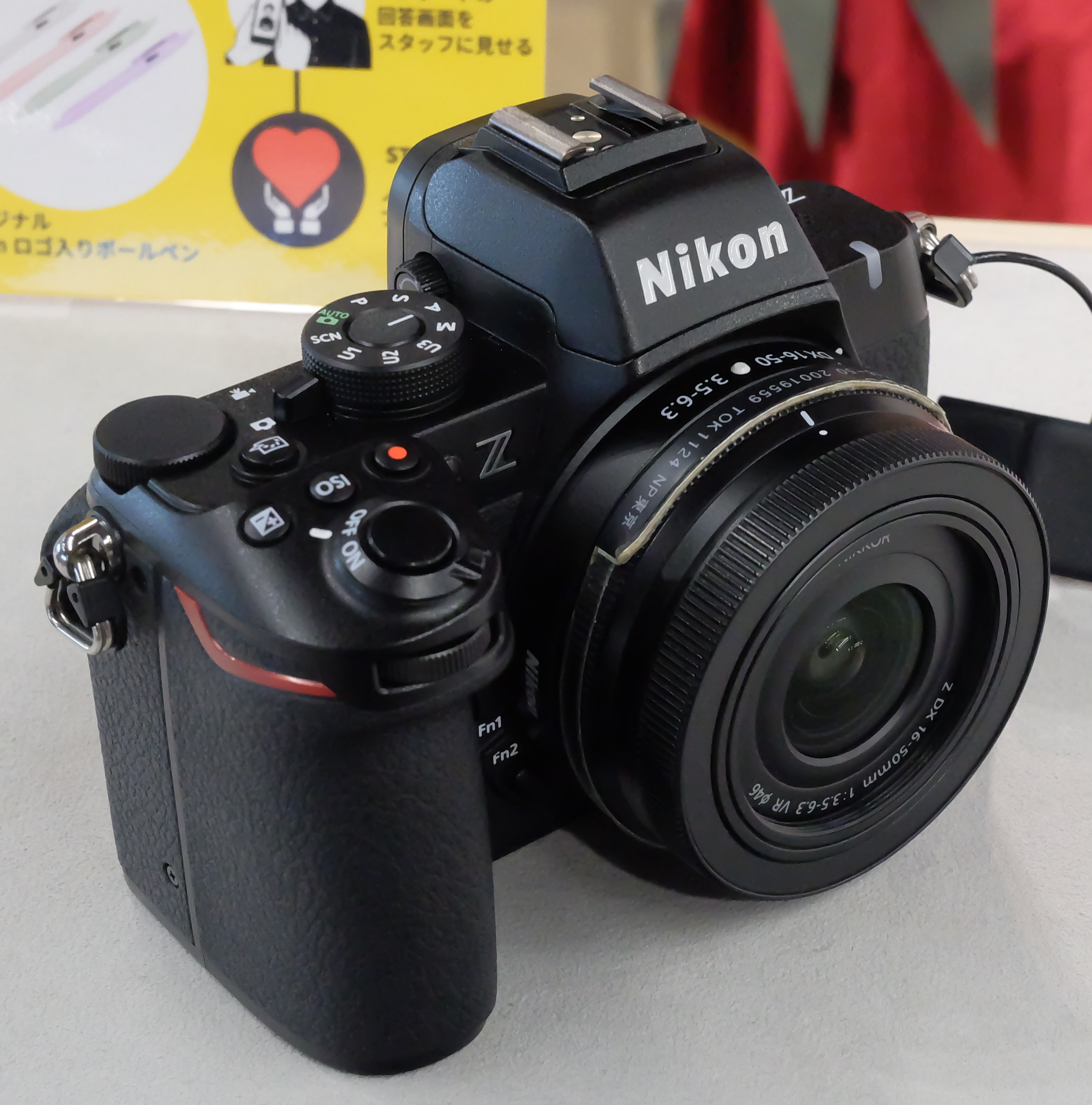

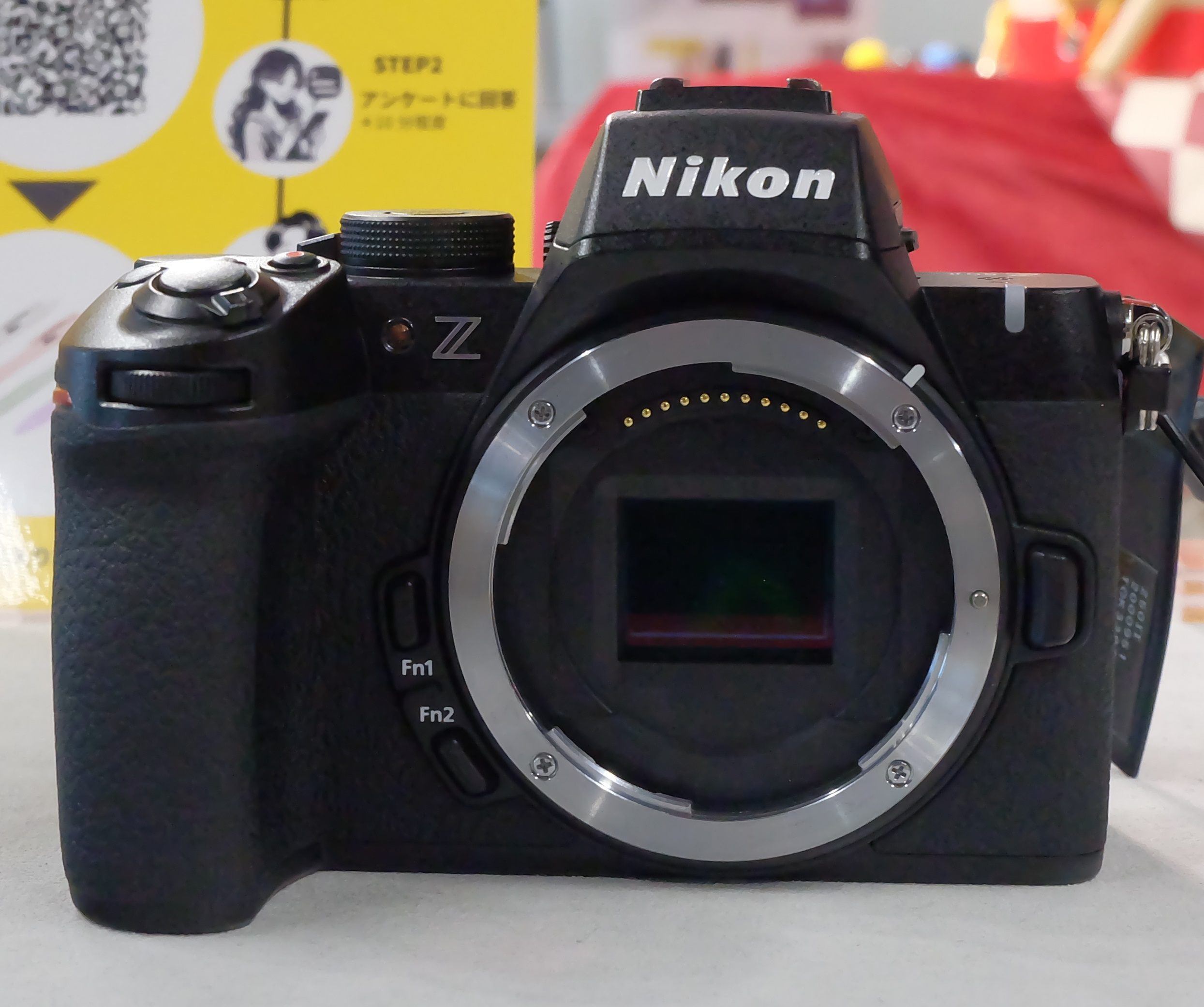

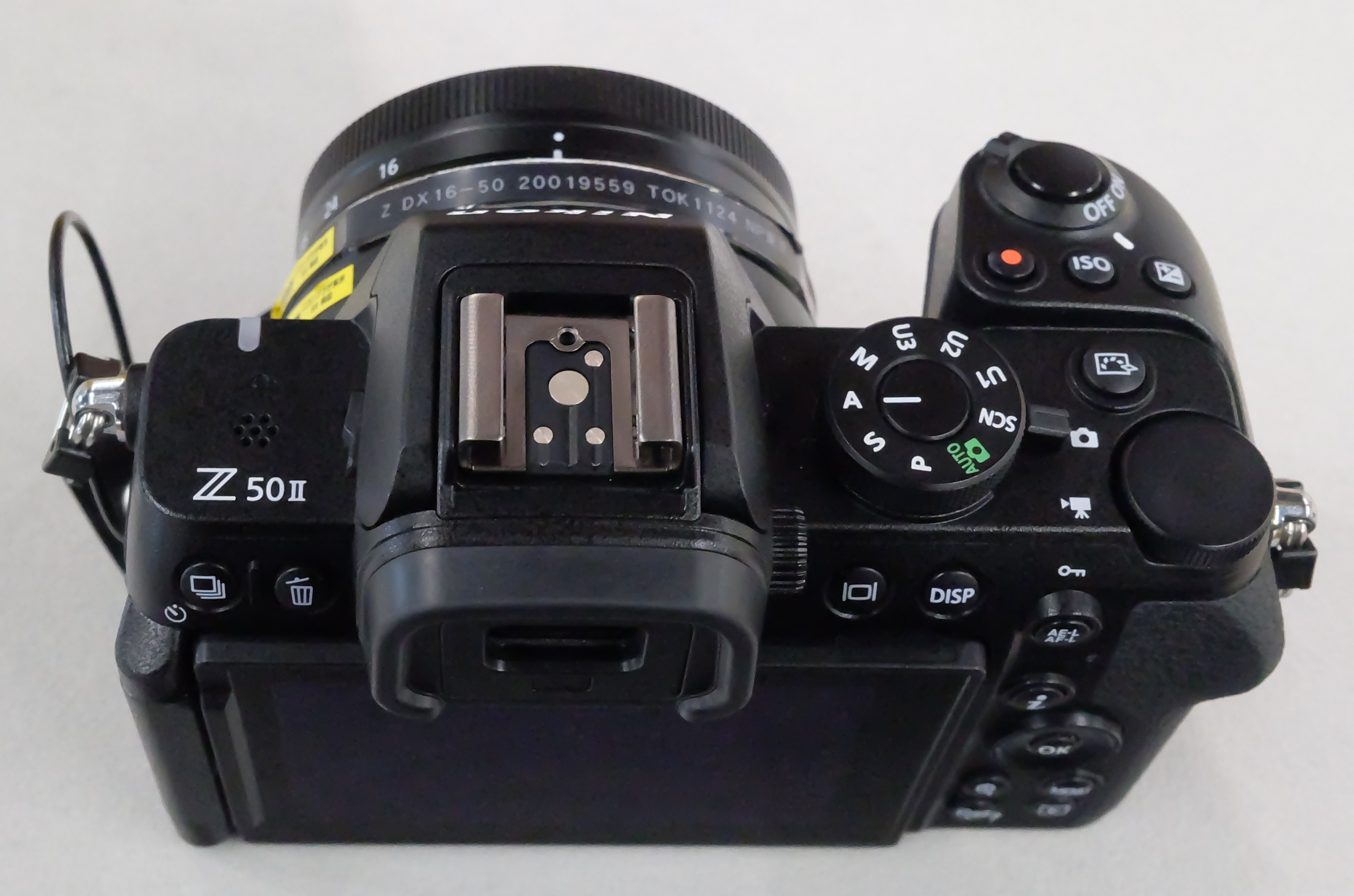

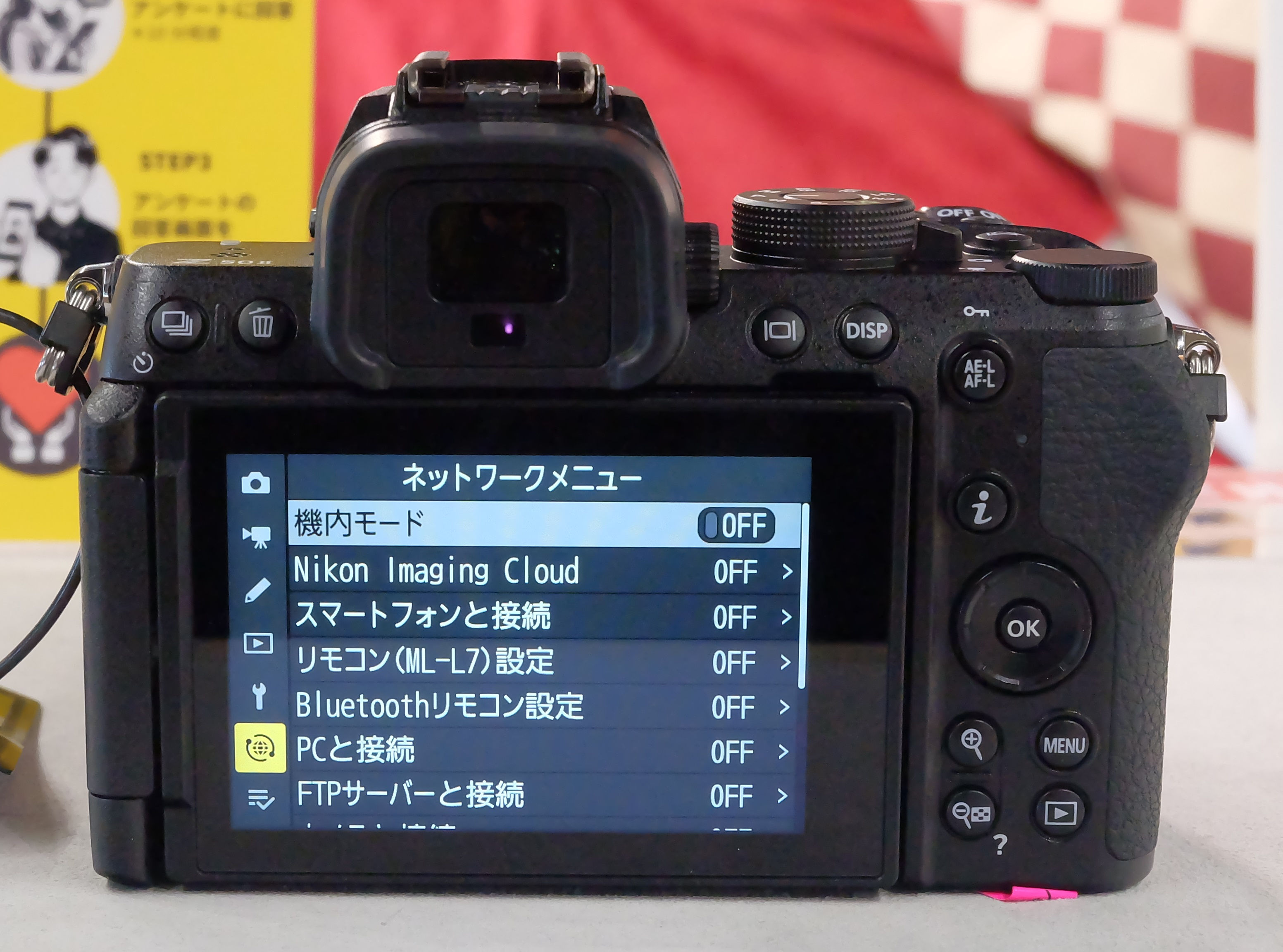

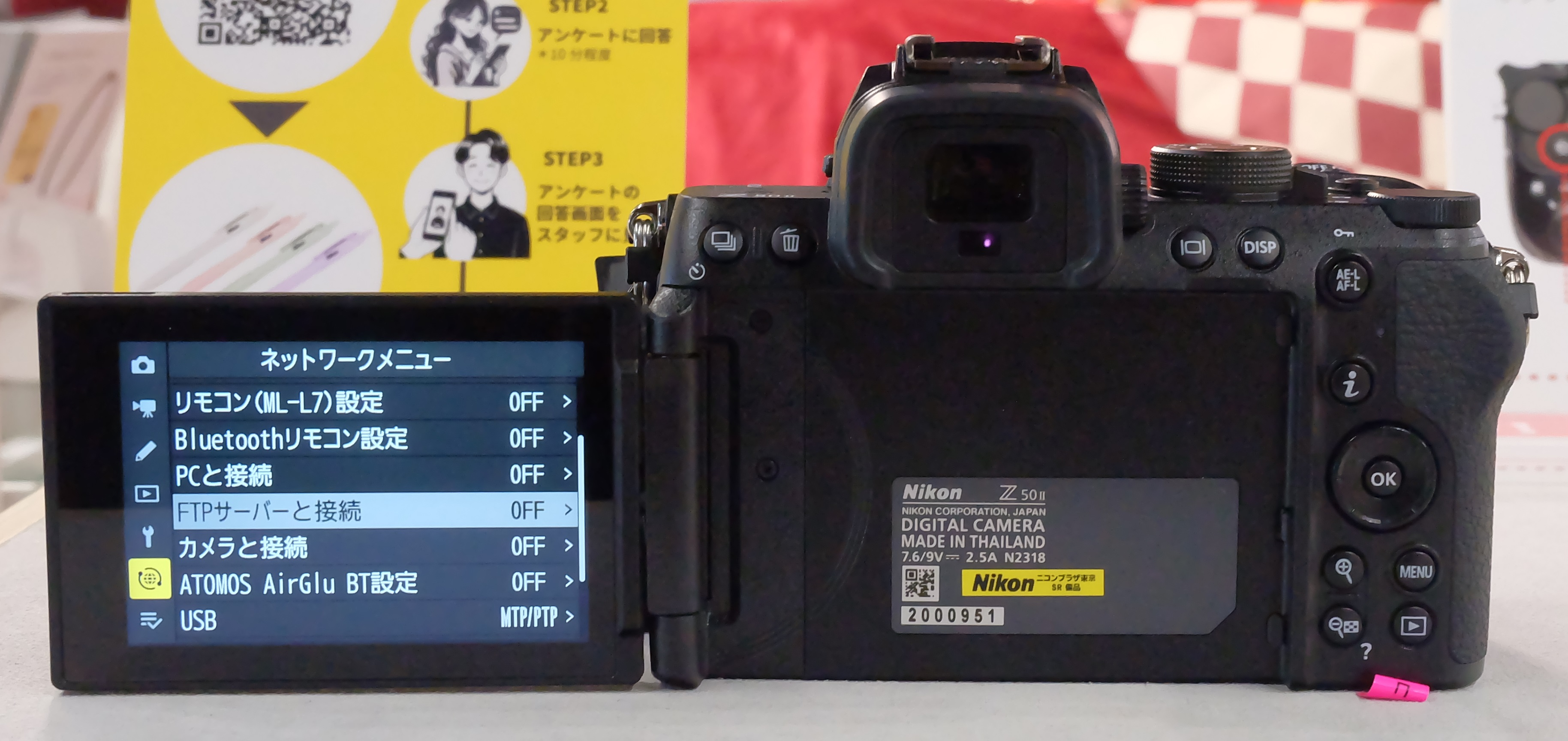

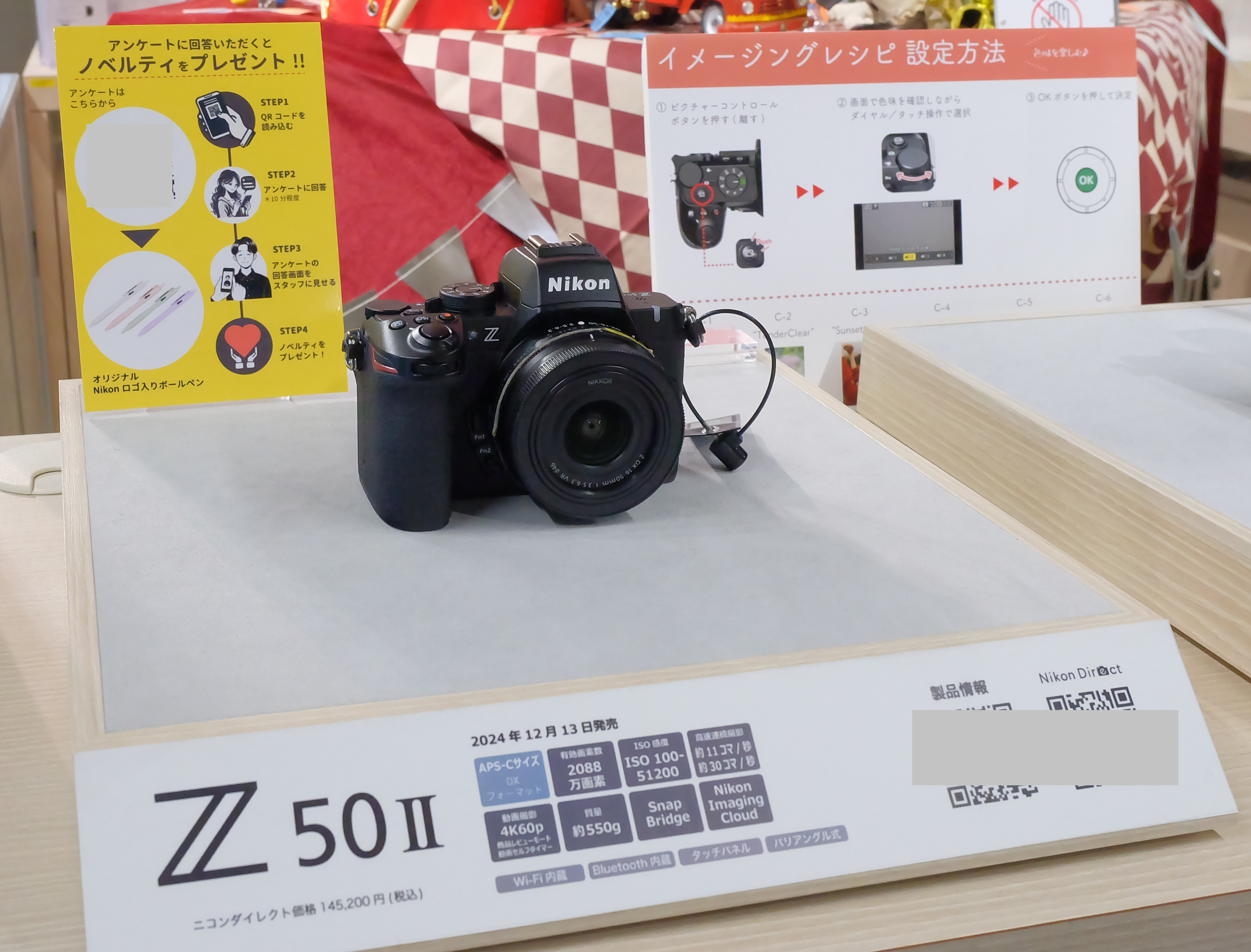

== Awards ==
The Z50II was awarded with:

- the TIPA World Awards 2025 in the category Best APS-C Enthusiast Camera,
- a 2025 Red Dot Award for Product Design,
- the EISA Best APS-C Camera 2025-2026 award,
- the Japan Institute of Design Promotion 2025 Good Design Award.
- iF Product Design Award 2026 in the category Digital Camera

== Update history ==
FW Version	Release date	Notes
1.00	2024-11-07	Initial firmware version
1.01	2025-04-16	When using a SmallRig SR-RG2 wireless shooting grip, the Pre-Release Capture function is now available; The Russian language was added for cameras sold in the Middle East region; In the CUSTOM SETTINGS MENU, d13 was renamed to "Display on during burst"; Bug fixes related to SnapBridge and synchronized release
1.02	2025-06-24	For Nikon Imaging Cloud, some of the explanatory texts displayed when connecting were modified (the connection procedure remains unchanged).
1.03	2025-11-05	For Nikon Imaging Cloud, some messages and default values were changed.; Picture Controls can now be acquired via a new method.; Bug fixes related to raw processing, raw playback zooming, occasional camera freeze in video mode, and inability to charge via USB while inserting a battery.

== Marketing slogans ==
When the Z50II was launched, Nikon used the following marketing slogans:

- English: “Discover. Play.”,
- Japanese: "本気であそぼう。" ("Let's play seriously.").

== Notes ==
Sensor	Class	2018	2019	2020	2021	2022	2023	2024	2025	2026
FX (Full-frame)	Flagship					^{8K} Z9 ^{S}				
FX (Full-frame)	Flagship							^{8K} Z8 ^{S}		
FX (Full-frame)	Professional		^{4K} Z7 ^{S}		^{4K} Z7Ⅱ ^{S}					
FX (Full-frame)	Professional		^{4K} Z6 ^{S}		^{4K} Z6Ⅱ ^{S}				^{6K} Z6Ⅲ ^{S}	
FX (Full-frame)	Cinema									^{6K} ZR ^{S}
FX (Full-frame)	Enthusiast							^{4K} Zf ^{S}		
FX (Full-frame)	Enthusiast				^{4K} Z5 ^{S}					^{4K} Z5Ⅱ ^{S}
FX (Full-frame)	Entry-level									^{4K} Z5ⅡC ^{S}
DX (APS-C)	Enthusiast								^{4K} Z50Ⅱ	
DX (APS-C)	Enthusiast					^{4K} Zfc				
DX (APS-C)	Prosumer			^{4K} Z50						
DX (APS-C)	Entry-level						^{4K} Z30			
Sensor	Class									
Sensor	Class	2018	2019	2020	2021	2022	2023	2024	2025	2026
