= Nikon Z50 =

2019 APS-C mirrorless interchangeable-lens camera

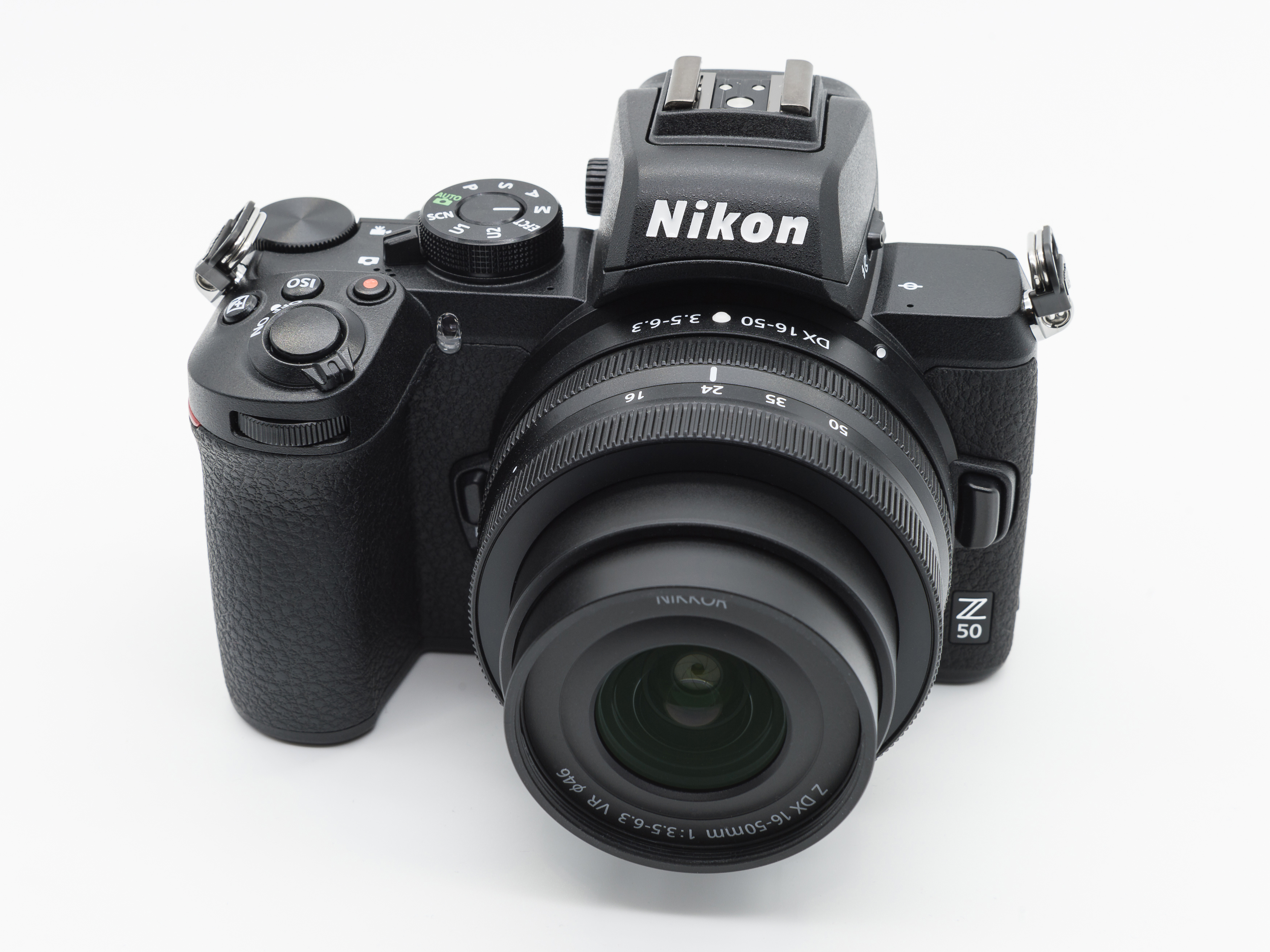
- Nikon Z50 with Nikkor Z DX 16-50 mm f/3.5–6.3 VR

Overview
- Maker: Nikon
- Type: Mirrorless interchangeable lens camera
- Production: 2019-10-10 through 2024-11-8 (5 years 1 month)
- Intro price: US$859.95

Lens
- Lens mount: Nikon Z-mount

Sensor/medium
- Sensor type: CMOS sensor
- Sensor size: 23.5 mm × 15.7 mm APS-C (Nikon DX format)
- Maximum resolution: 5,568 × 3,712 (20.9 effective megapixels)
- Film speed: ISO 100–51200 (standard); ISO 100–204800 (expandable)
- Recording medium: 1 × SD (UHS-I)

Focusing
- Focus: Hybrid AF
- Focus areas: 209 points

Exposure/metering
- Exposure: TTL exposure metering
- Exposure modes: Programmed Auto [P] with flexible program; Shutter-Priority Auto [S]; Aperture-Priority Auto [A]; Manual [M]; Scene Modes [SCN]
- Exposure metering: TTL exposure metering

Flash
- Flash: Built-in: internal guidenumber 7 Hot shoe

Shutter
- Shutter: Electronically controlled vertical-travel focal-plane mechanical shutter, Electronic front-curtain shutter
- Shutter speeds: 30s – 1/4000s
- Continuous shooting: 5 fps / 11 fps (expand)

Image processing
- Image processor: EXPEED 6
- White balance: Auto (3 variants); natural light auto; direct sunlight; cloudy; shade; incandescent; fluorescent (7 variants); flash; manual white point (2500‑10000 K); preset manual (6 variants)

General
- Video recording: 4K UHD at 30/25/24p; Full HD at 120/100/60/50/30/25/24p
- LCD screen: 3.2-inch tilting TFT LCD with touchscreen, 1.04 million dots
- Battery: EN-EL25; EN-EL25a (requires FW update)
- AV port(s): USB Micro-B, HDMI Type-D
- Data port(s): IEEE 802.11b/g/n/a/ac/Wi-Fi, Bluetooth Low Energy
- Dimensions: 126.5×93.5×60 mm (4.98×3.68×2.36 in)
- Weight: 395 g (14 oz) (body only); 450g (including battery)
- Latest firmware: 2.60 / 23 April 2025; 18 months ago
- Made in: Thailand

Chronology
- Successor: Nikon Zfc; Nikon Z30; Nikon Z50II

Z50 logo

The Z50 is an upper entry-level APS-C mirrorless camera (1.5x APS crop) announced by Nikon on October 10, 2019. It is Nikon's first Z-mount crop sensor camera body. With its introduction, Nikon also announced its first two crop-sensor Z-mount lenses, the Nikkor Z DX 16-50 mm f/3.5–6.3 VR and the Nikkor Z DX 50-250 mm f/4.5–6.3 VR. It is the third Z-mount camera body after the Nikon Z7 and Nikon Z6. The camera yields an effective 20.9-megapixel still image and 4K video (up to 30 fps and 30 minutes time limit per clip).

The Z50 uses the Nikon Z-mount, developed by Nikon for its mirrorless digital cameras. Nikon F-mount lenses can be used, with various degrees of compatibility, via the Nikon FTZ (F-to-Z) and FTZ II mount adapters.

It does not include built-in sensor cleaning, nor is IBIS present, although Vibration Reduction on some Nikkor and third-party lenses is provided. It is the only Nikon Z camera body that does not have in-camera USB-C charging.

The Nikon Z50 was succeeded by the Nikon Z50II in November 2024, with Nikon announcing that the Z50 was discontinued on 8 November 2024.

== Gallery ==
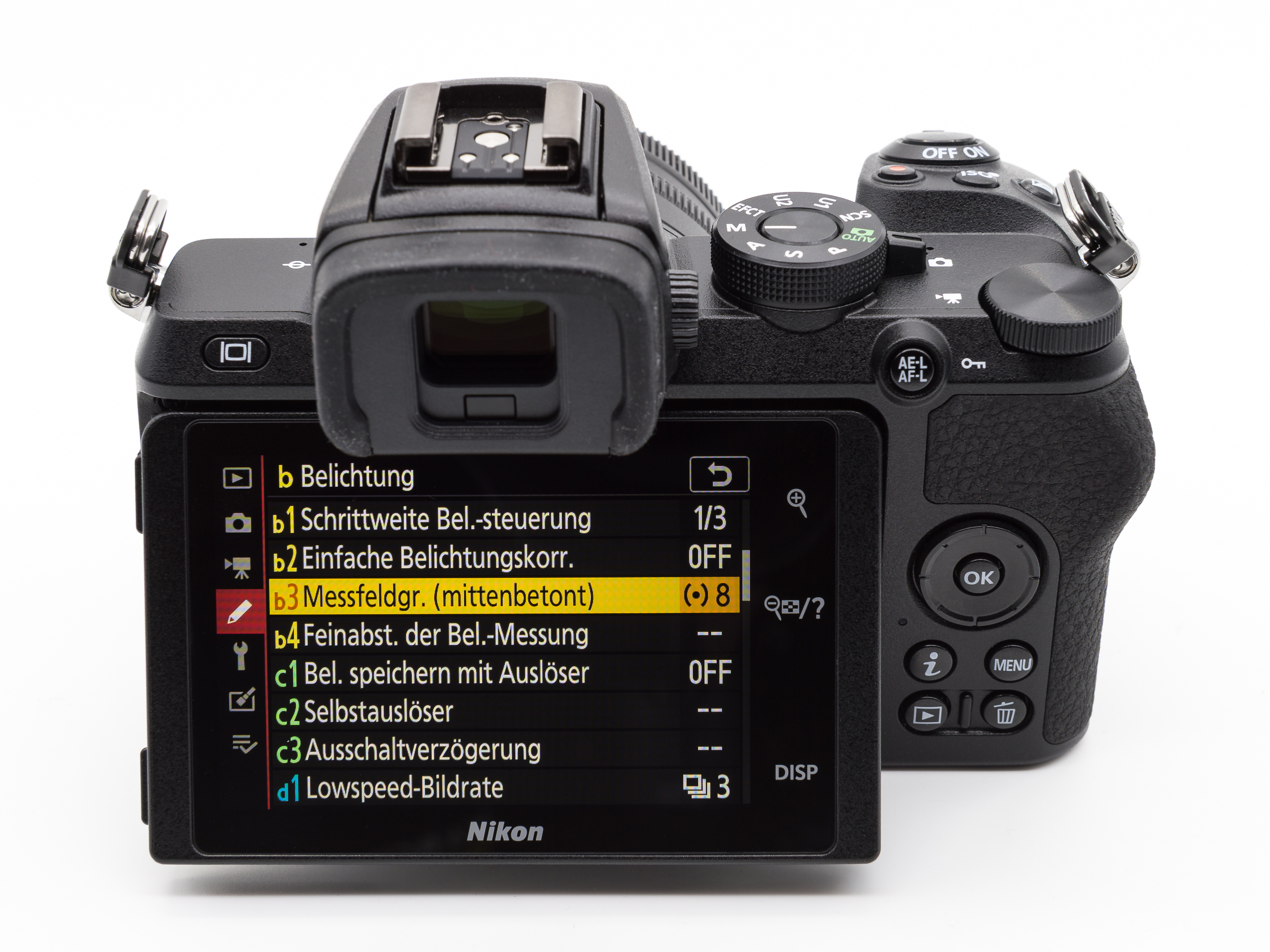

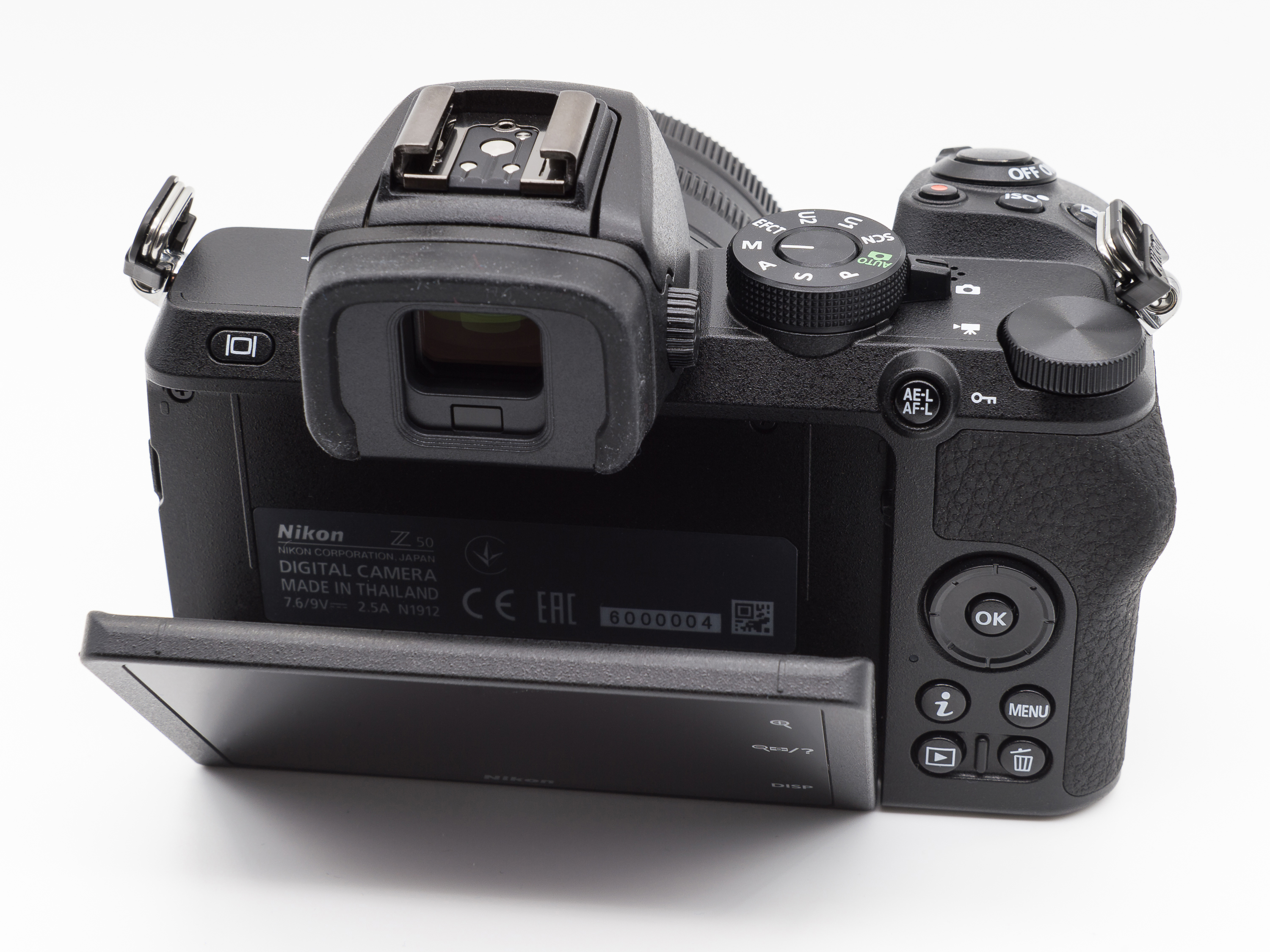

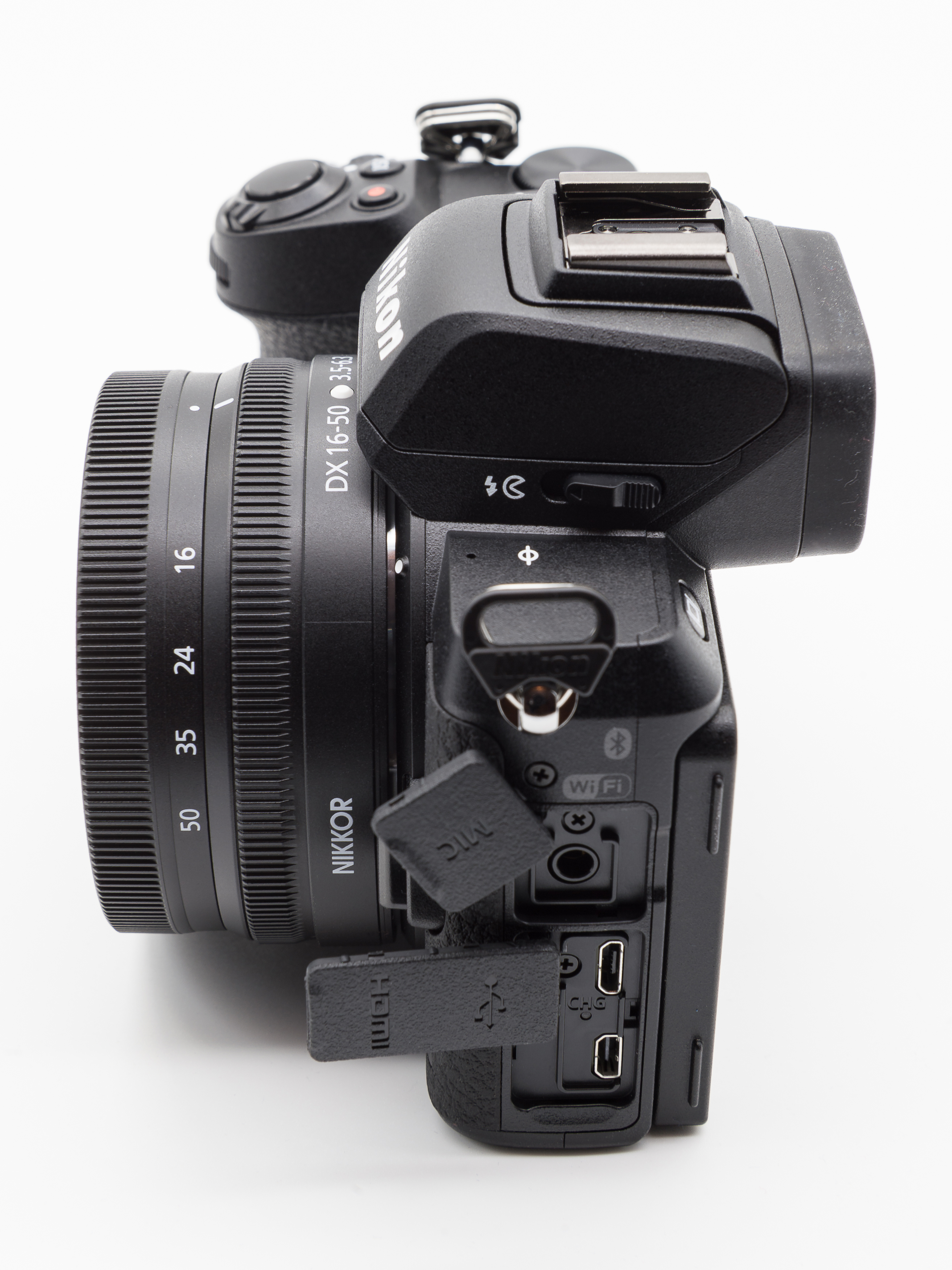

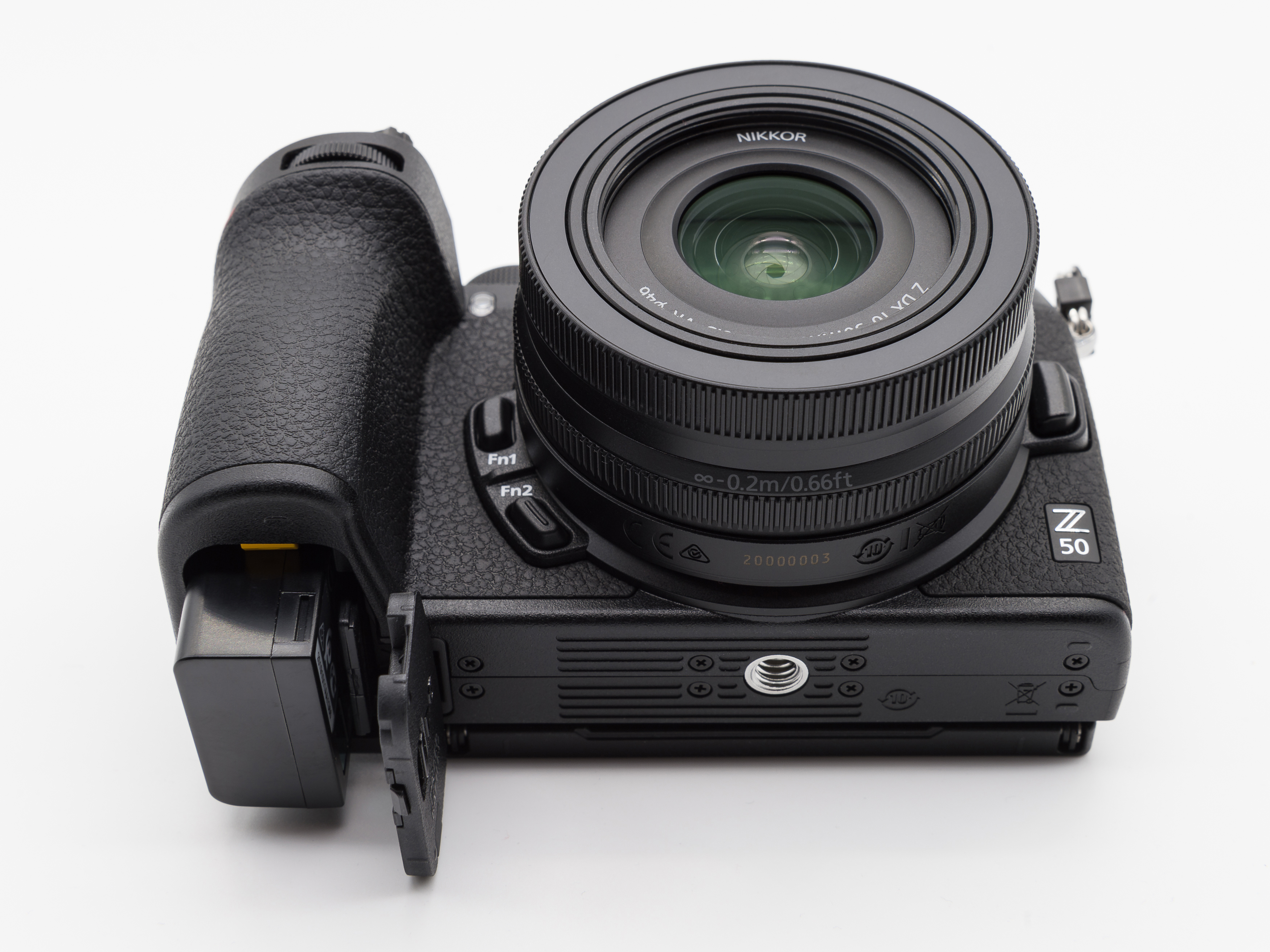

== Update history ==
Version	Release date	Notes
1.00	2019-10-10	Initial firmware version
1.10	2020-02-12	Added support for the focus limit switch available on certain Z mount lenses (as of February 12, 2020, only the NIKKOR Z 70–200mm f/2.8 VR S). The lens Fn2 button is not supported.; Movie footage shot in self-portrait mode is now filmed using AF-F (full-time autofocus), regardless of the option selected for autofocus mode.
1.11	2020-05-15	Added support for the Fn2 button found on some lenses
2.00	2020-07-21	With the addition of an [Animal detection on] option to Custom Setting a2 ([Auto-area AF face/eye detection]), face/eye-detection AF is now available with dogs and cats; when this option is enabled, the camera will now detect the eyes and faces of dogs and cats (in movie mode, only faces are detected). [Animal detection on] is selected automatically when the mode dial is in the SCN (scene mode) position with [Pet portrait] selected.; Added support for Nikon Z mount TC-1.4x/TC-2.0x teleconverters.; Added support for F mount lens firmware updates. F mount lens firmware updates are supported from FTZ mount adapter firmware version 1.10.; Changed some of the f/-number values displayed when exposure is adjusted in steps of 1/3 EV (f/1.2 is now displayed as f/1.3). As of July 21, 2020, this applies to NIKKOR Z 58mm f/0.95 S Noct lenses.; The bracketing increment is now properly applied to photos taken with exposure locked during [AE bracketing] in [Continuous H (extended)] release mode.; Release-priority is now enabled if AF-S [Single AF] is selected for [Focus mode] when AF-ON is assigned to the AE-L/AF-L button.; The following improvements have been made to subject tracking: Users can now switch between the auto-area AF and target selection displays using a custom control such as the Fn1 button.; The behavior of subject tracking when AF-C is selected during still photography now more closely resembles that for [3D-tracking] on digital SLR cameras.; The conditions for displaying the prompt suggesting the use of the flash have been reviewed and the prompt is now displayed under more appropriate conditions.; Fixed the following issues: The crop selected for “tall” (portrait-orientation) pictures using PictBridge would not be accurately reflected in the printed image.; In rare circumstances, autofocus would not engage if a NIKKOR Z DX 16–50mm f/3.5–6.3 VR lens was extended at the same time the camera was turned on.
2.01	2020-09-01	Fixed character display issues that occurred when Korean or simplified Chinese was selected for the language item in the camera menus. No update is required if the language item in the menus for your camera does not list options for Korean or simplified Chinese.
2.02	2020-10-16	Fixed an issue with firmware versions 2.00 and 2.01 in which fine-tuning values selected for [AF fine-tune] > [Saved value] were not correctly applied when pictures were taken.
2.03	2021-03-03	Fixed the following issues: Pressing the playback zoom in button to display a preview would cancel changes to [Set Picture Control] > [Hue] made using [NEF (RAW) processing] in the [RETOUCH MENU].; Certain aperture values would not be selected when control rings for the following lenses were rotated to stop aperture down in movie mode: NIKKOR Z 50mm f/1.2 S; NIKKOR Z 24-50mm f/4-6.3; NIKKOR Z 24-200mm f/4-6.3 VR; NIKKOR Z DX 16-50mm f/3.5-6.3 VR; NIKKOR Z DX 50-250mm f/4.5-6.3 VR
2.10	2021-04-26	A [Save focus position] option has been added to the [SETUP MENU]. If [On] is selected, the focus position in effect when the camera is turned off will be restored when the camera is next turned on. This option applies only when the camera is used with Z mount autofocus lenses.; Fixed an issue that resulted in the option selected for Custom Setting a2 ([Auto-area AF face/eye detection]) in P, S, A, and M modes being reset whenever Custom Settings for mode U1 or U2 were reset.
2.11	2021-06-24	Added support for NIKKOR Z MC 50mm f/2.8 and NIKKOR Z MC 105mm f/2.8 VR S lenses.; Fixed an issue occurring after the camera firmware was updated to version 2.10 that sometimes amplified the sounds generated by the aperture mechanisms when zoom or focus rings were rotated on certain F mount lenses connected via an FTZ mount adapter.
2.20	2021-11-10	Added support for: FTZ II mount adapters, NIKKOR Z 24-120mm f/4 S lenses, NIKKOR Z 28-75mm f/2.8 lenses, and; NIKKOR Z 400mm f/2.8 TC VR S lenses.; Improved face/eye detection performance and the visibility of subjects in pictures taken using an optional flash unit.
2.30	2022-10-20	[Save focus position] and [Recall focus position] have been added to the roles that can be assigned using Custom Setting f2 [Custom controls (shooting)] in the [CUSTOM SETTING MENU]. As of October 20, 2022, these options were supported with the following lenses: NIKKOR Z 70-200mm f/2.8 VR S; NIKKOR Z 100-400mm f/4.5-5.6 VR S; NIKKOR Z 400mm f/2.8 TC VR S; NIKKOR Z 400mm f/4.5 VR S; NIKKOR Z 800mm f/6.3 VR S; The behavior of autofocus during memory recall has been improved to ensure that the focus position will not change in any focus mode even if the shutter-release button is pressed halfway while focus recall is in progress.; During remote photography with the ML-L7, the camera will now focus with every shot taken with [AF-C] selected for [Focus mode] if [Release] is chosen for Custom Setting a1 [AF-C priority selection] in the [CUSTOM SETTING MENU].; Fixed an issue that sometimes resulted in the settings selected for Custom Setting f2 [Custom controls (shooting)] in the [CUSTOM SETTING MENU] not performing as expected in user settings modes.
2.40	2023-01-24	Eye-detection AF is now available during video recording.; Improved eye-detection performance for [Auto-area AF].; Improved the refresh rate for the focus points displayed in live view during subject-tracking and face/eye-detection AF.
2.50	2023-06-06	Added support for the power zoom feature on power zoom lenses.; Added support for EN-EL25a rechargeable Li-ion batteries.
2.51	2024-04-09	Changed the default values for the following settings displayed when connecting wirelessly: Encryption keys; The password displayed after the camera's default settings are restored
2.60	2025-04-23	Fixed an issue where browsing other pictures would not function as expected after using a stretch gesture to zoom in on a picture taken in portrait orientation.

== Marketing slogans ==
When the Z50 was launched, Nikon used a two-word marketing slogan: “The Collaborator.”

Sensor	Class	2018	2019	2020	2021	2022	2023	2024	2025	2026
FX (Full-frame)	Flagship					^{8K} Z9 ^{S}				
FX (Full-frame)	Flagship							^{8K} Z8 ^{S}		
FX (Full-frame)	Professional		^{4K} Z7 ^{S}		^{4K} Z7Ⅱ ^{S}					
FX (Full-frame)	Professional		^{4K} Z6 ^{S}		^{4K} Z6Ⅱ ^{S}				^{6K} Z6Ⅲ ^{S}	
FX (Full-frame)	Cinema									^{6K} ZR ^{S}
FX (Full-frame)	Enthusiast							^{4K} Zf ^{S}		
FX (Full-frame)	Enthusiast				^{4K} Z5 ^{S}					^{4K} Z5Ⅱ ^{S}
FX (Full-frame)	Entry-level									^{4K} Z5ⅡC ^{S}
DX (APS-C)	Enthusiast								^{4K} Z50Ⅱ	
DX (APS-C)	Enthusiast					^{4K} Zfc				
DX (APS-C)	Prosumer			^{4K} Z50						
DX (APS-C)	Entry-level						^{4K} Z30			
Sensor	Class									
Sensor	Class	2018	2019	2020	2021	2022	2023	2024	2025	2026
