= Nikon Z30 =

2022 APS-C mirrorless interchangeable-lens camera

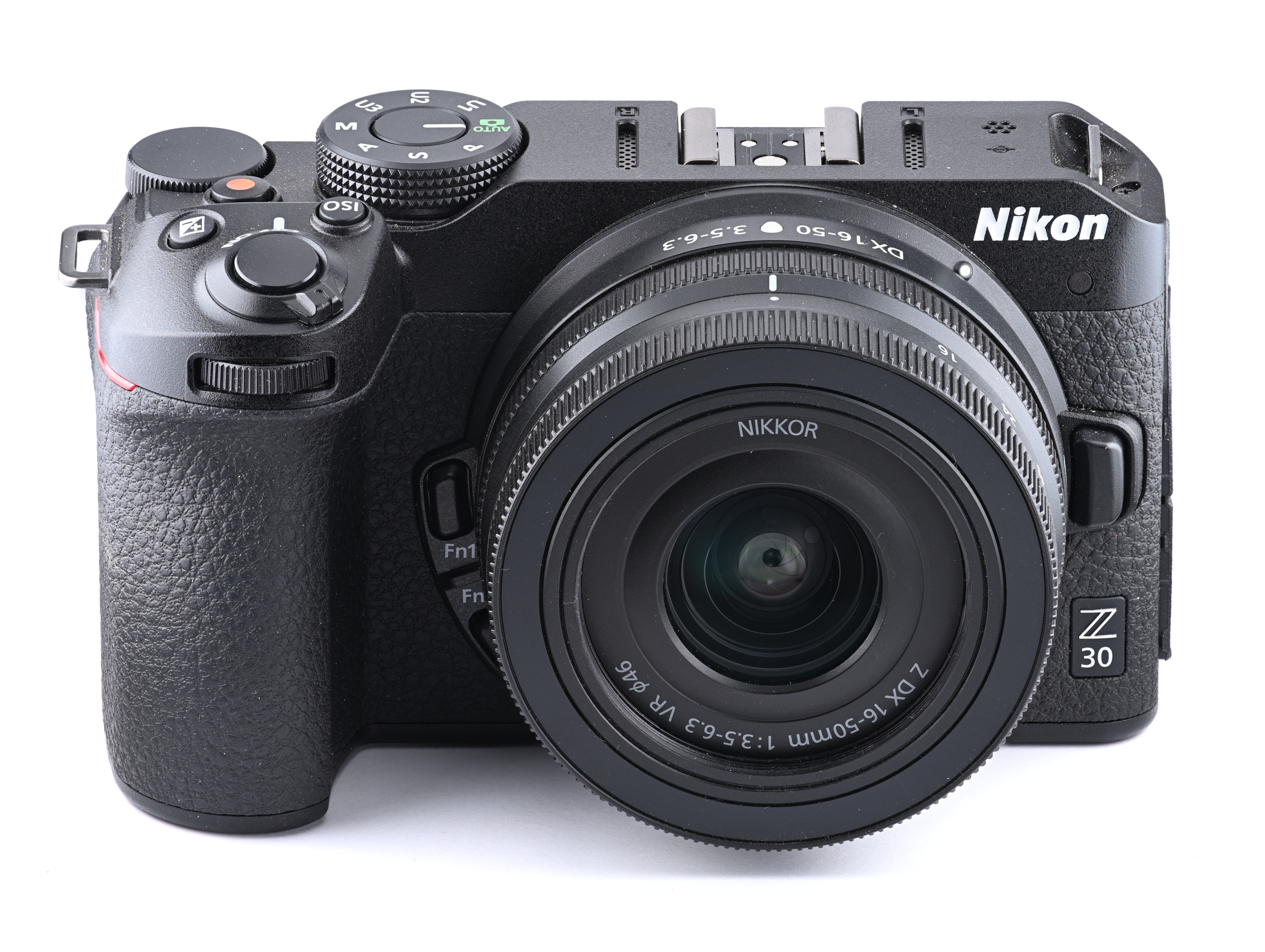
- Nikon Z30 + NIKKOR Z DX 16-50 mm f/3.5–6.3 VR

Overview
- Maker: Nikon
- Type: Mirrorless interchangeable lens camera
- Released: August 5, 2022; 4 years ago
- Intro price: JPY 98000; USD 607

Lens
- Lens mount: Nikon Z
- Lens: Interchangeable

Sensor/medium
- Sensor type: CMOS
- Sensor size: 23.5×15.7 mm APS-C (Nikon DX format)
- Sensor maker: Tower Semiconductor
- Maximum resolution: 5,568×3,712 pixels (20.9 effective megapixels)
- Film speed: ISO 100–51200 (standard); ISO 100–204800 (expandable)
- Recording medium: 1 × SD (UHS-I)

Focusing
- Focus: Hybrid AF
- Focus areas: 209 points

Exposure/metering
- Exposure: TTL exposure metering
- Exposure modes: Programmed Auto [P] with flexible program; Shutter-Priority Auto [S]; Aperture-Priority Auto [A]; Manual [M]
- Exposure metering: TTL exposure metering

Flash
- Flash: Hot shoe only

Shutter
- Shutter: Electronically controlled vertical-travel focal-plane mechanical shutter, Electronic front-curtain shutter
- Shutter speed range: 30s – 1/4000s
- Continuous shooting: 11 fps

Image processing
- Image processor: EXPEED 6
- White balance: Auto (3 variants), natural light auto, direct sunlight, cloudy, shade, incandescent, fluorescent (3 variants), flash, manual white point (2500K-10000K), preset manual (6 variants)

General
- Video recording: 4K UHD at 30p/25p/24p, Full HD at 120p/100p/60p/50p/30p/25p/24p
- LCD screen: 3-inch articulating TFT LCD with touchscreen, 1.04 million dots
- Battery: EN-EL25; USB-C PD rechargeable EN-EL25a (requires FW update)
- Optional accessories: MC-N10 remote grip (fw. 1.10+)
- AV port(s): USB Type-C, HDMI Type-D
- Data port(s): IEEE 802.11b/g/n/a/ac/Wi-Fi, Bluetooth Low Energy
- Dimensions: 128×73.5×59.5 mm (5.04×2.89×2.34 in)
- Weight: 350 g (12 oz) (body only); 405g (including battery)
- Latest firmware: 1.20 / 7 May 2025; 18 months ago
- Made in: Thailand

Chronology
- Predecessor: Nikon Z50

The Z30 is an APS-C mirrorless camera (1.5x APS Crop) announced by Nikon on June 29, 2022. It is the ninth Z-mount camera body and the third APS-C Z-mount body. The Z30 is the first Z-mount camera body which does not have a built-in viewfinder, using only the articulating TFT LCD with touchscreen. The camera yields an effective 20.9-megapixel still image and 4K video (up to 30 fps).

It does not include built-in sensor cleaning, nor is IBIS present, although Vibration Reduction on some Nikkor and third-party lenses is provided.

Building on the functionality of the Nikon Z50 and Nikon Zfc, this model was designed for vloggers with an emphasis on video recording functions. It is compatible with the ML-L7 Bluetooth remote control (sold separately) and the SmallRig Tripod Grip 3070.

== Lenses ==
The Z30 uses the Nikon Z-mount, developed by Nikon for its mirrorless digital cameras.

Nikon F-mount lenses can be used, with various degrees of compatibility, via the Nikon FTZ (F-to-Z) and FTZ II mount adapters.

== Gallery ==
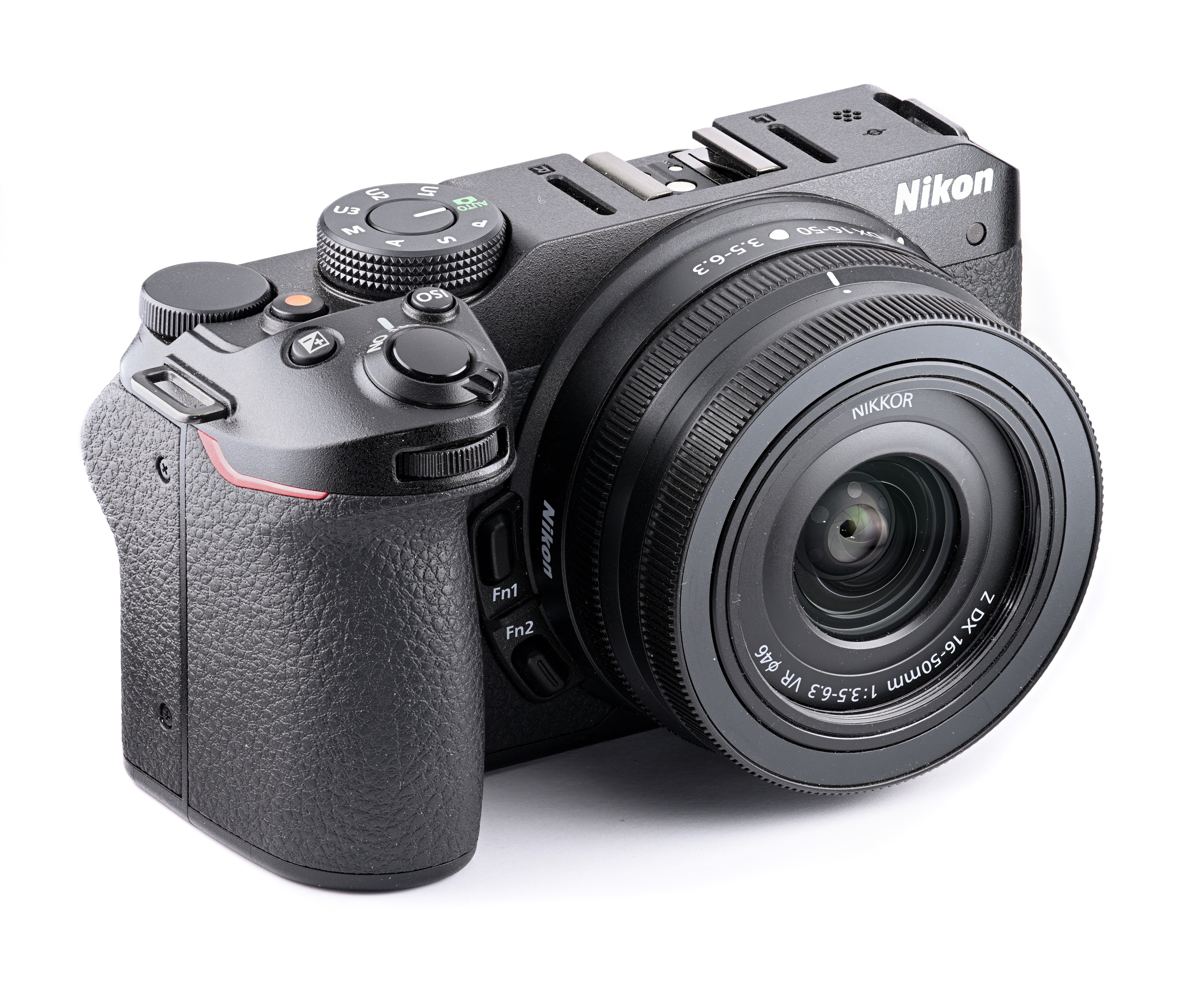
Z30 + Nikkor Z DX 16-50 mm f/3.5–6.3 VR

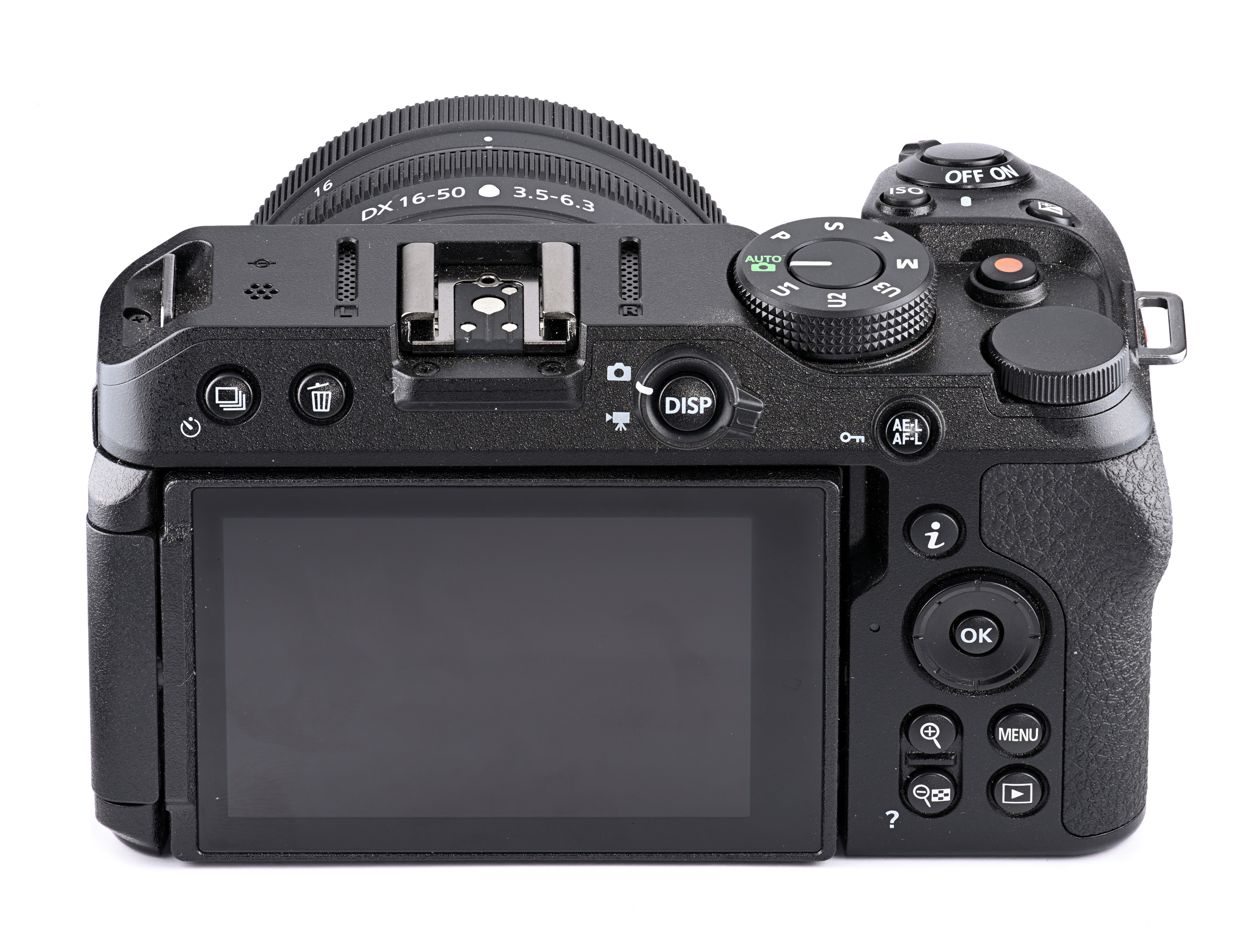

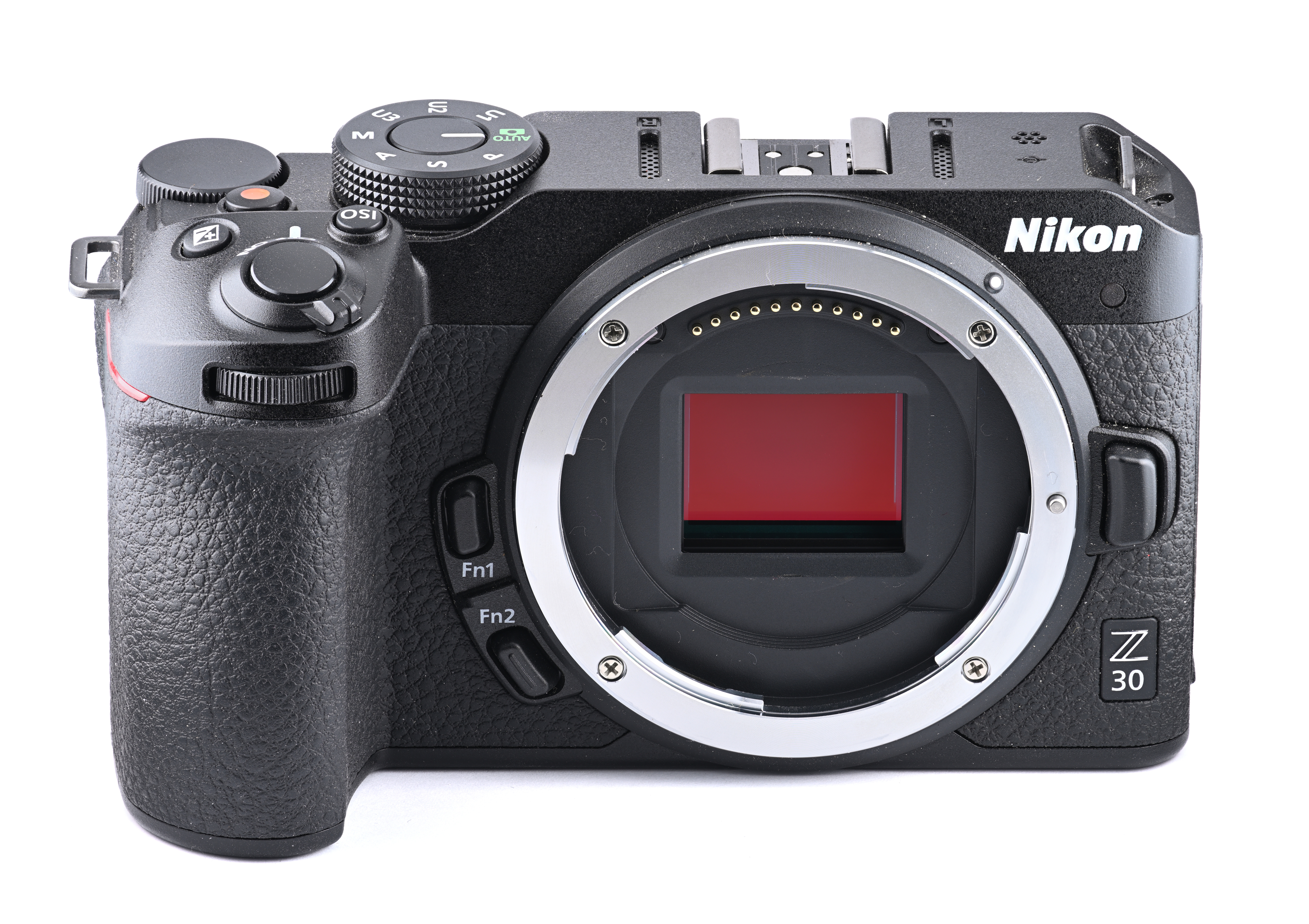

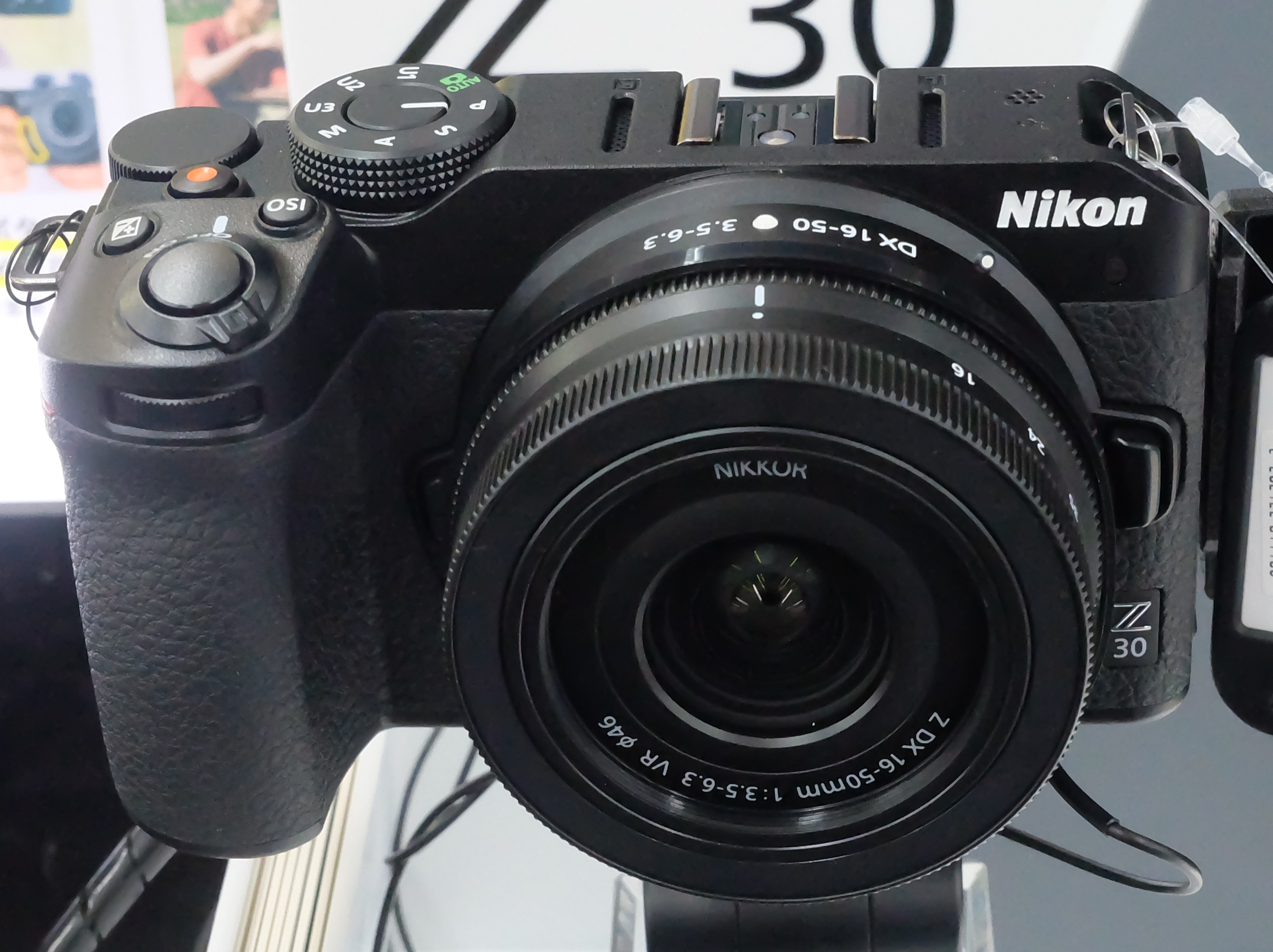

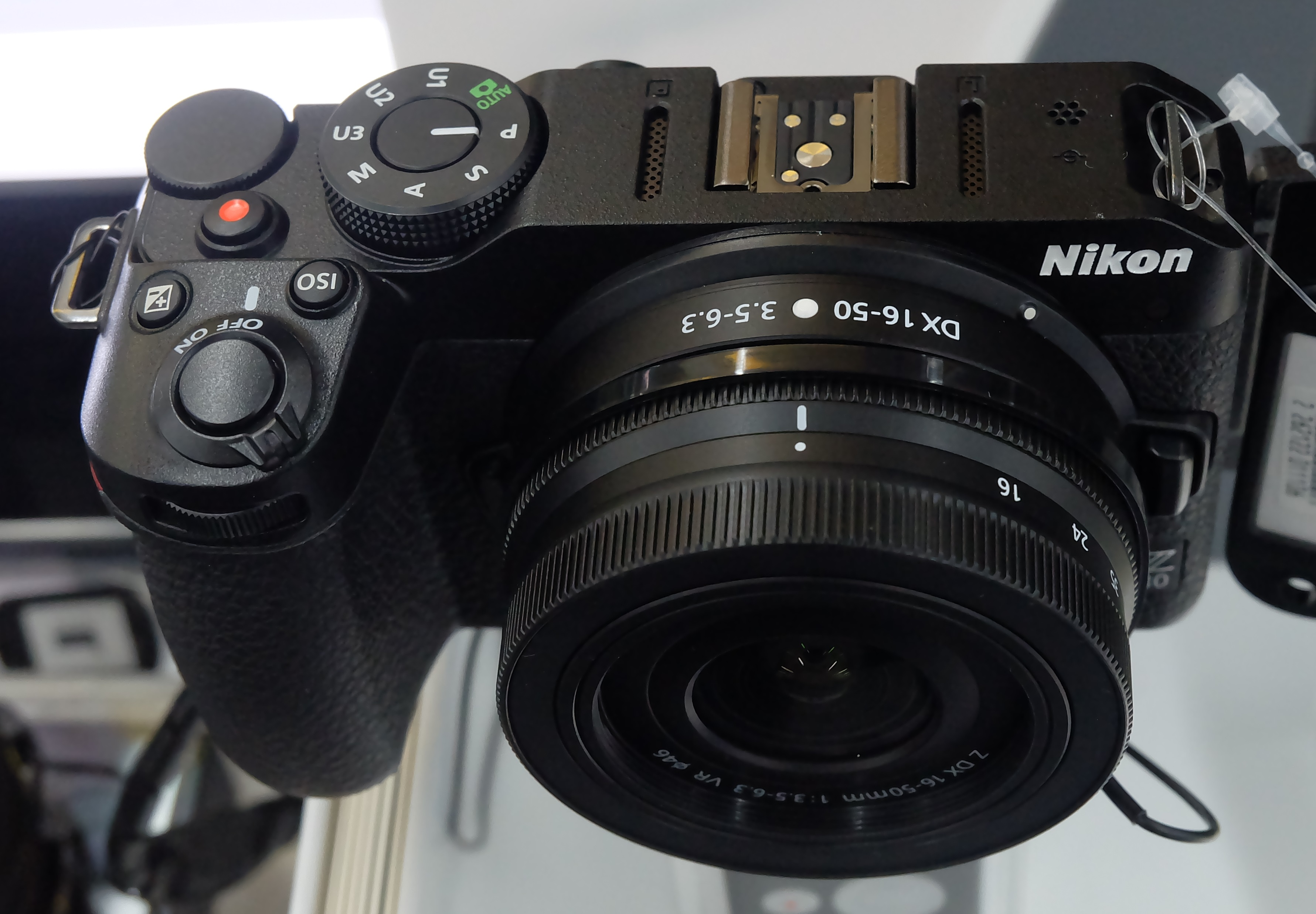

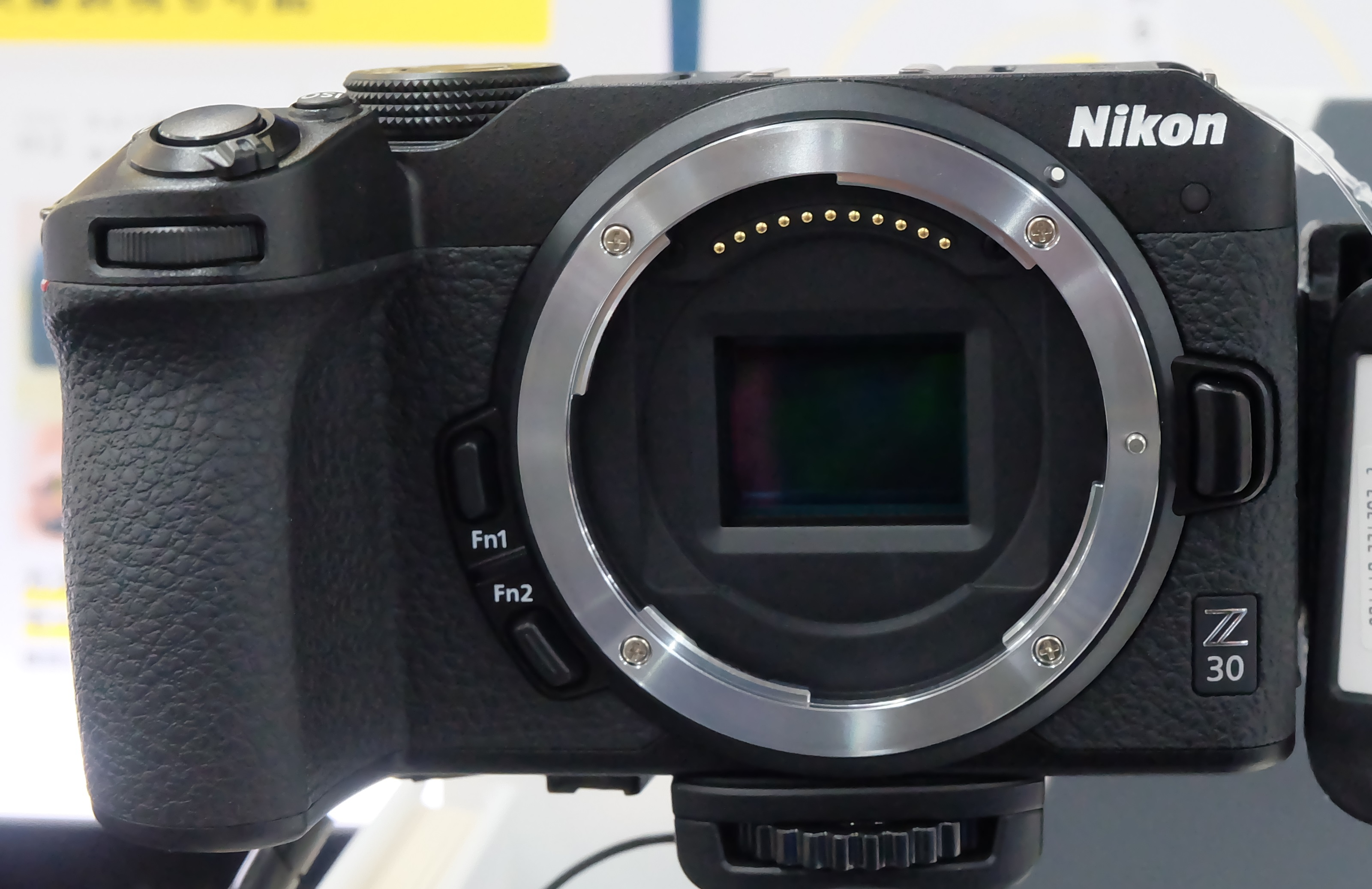

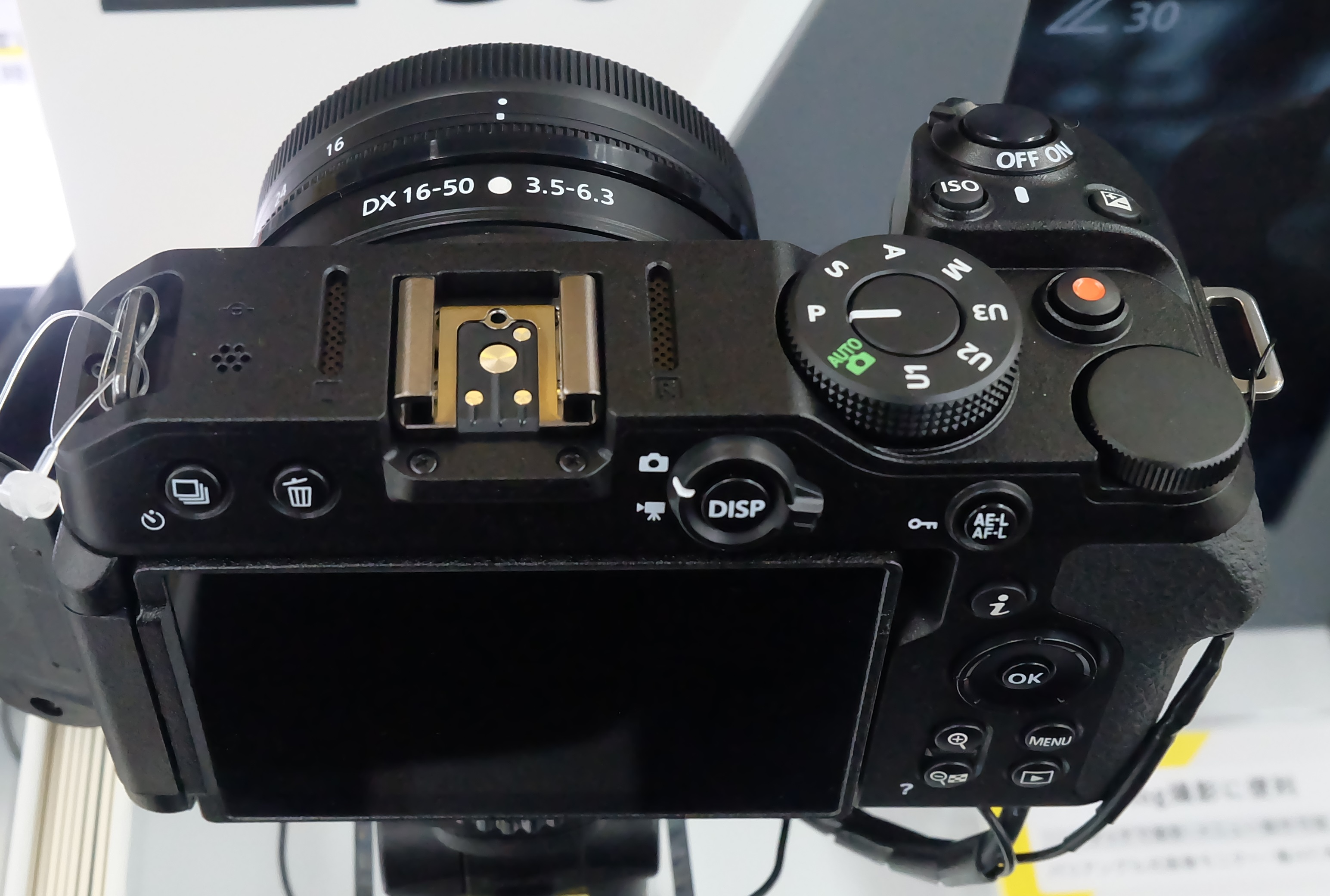

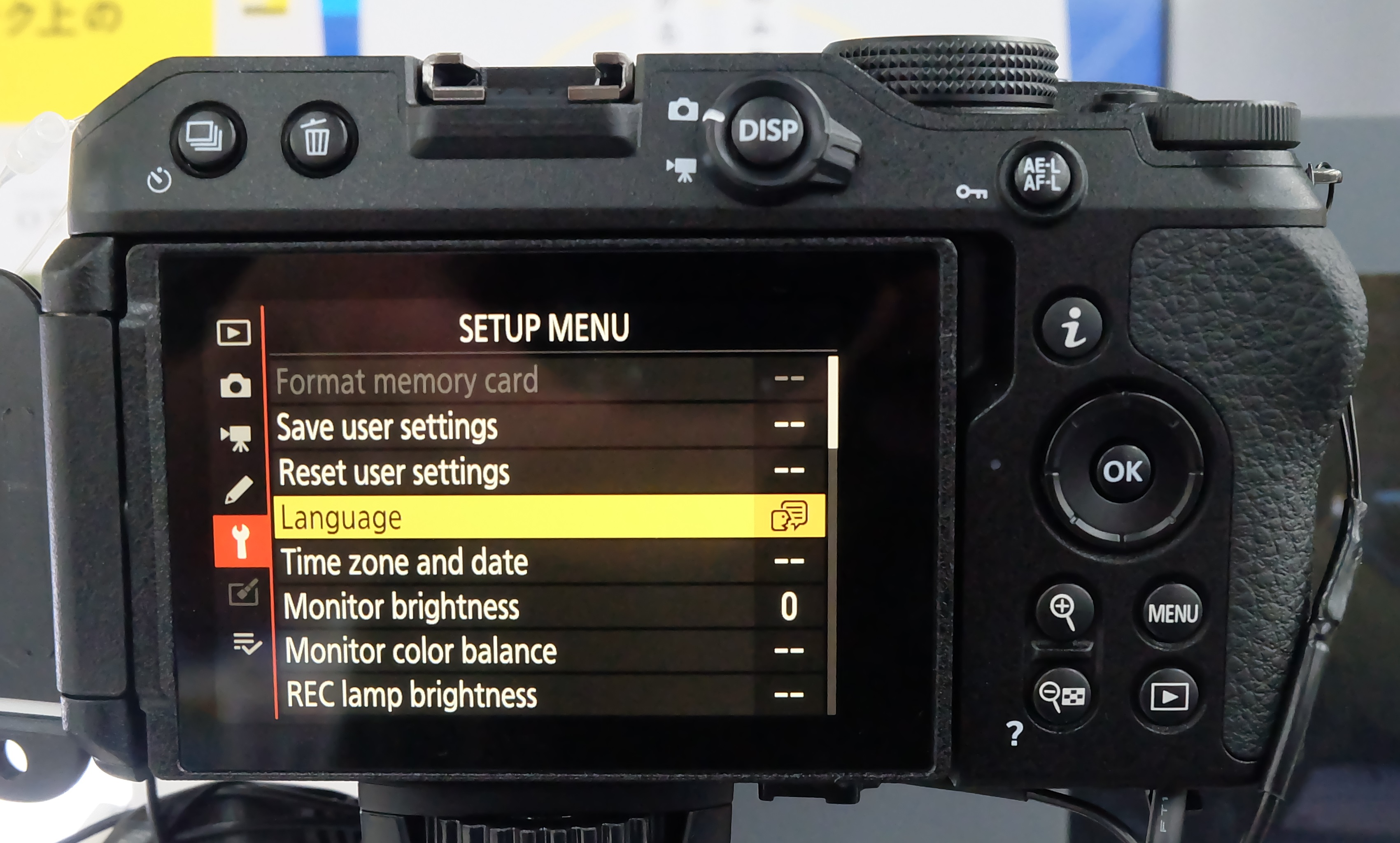

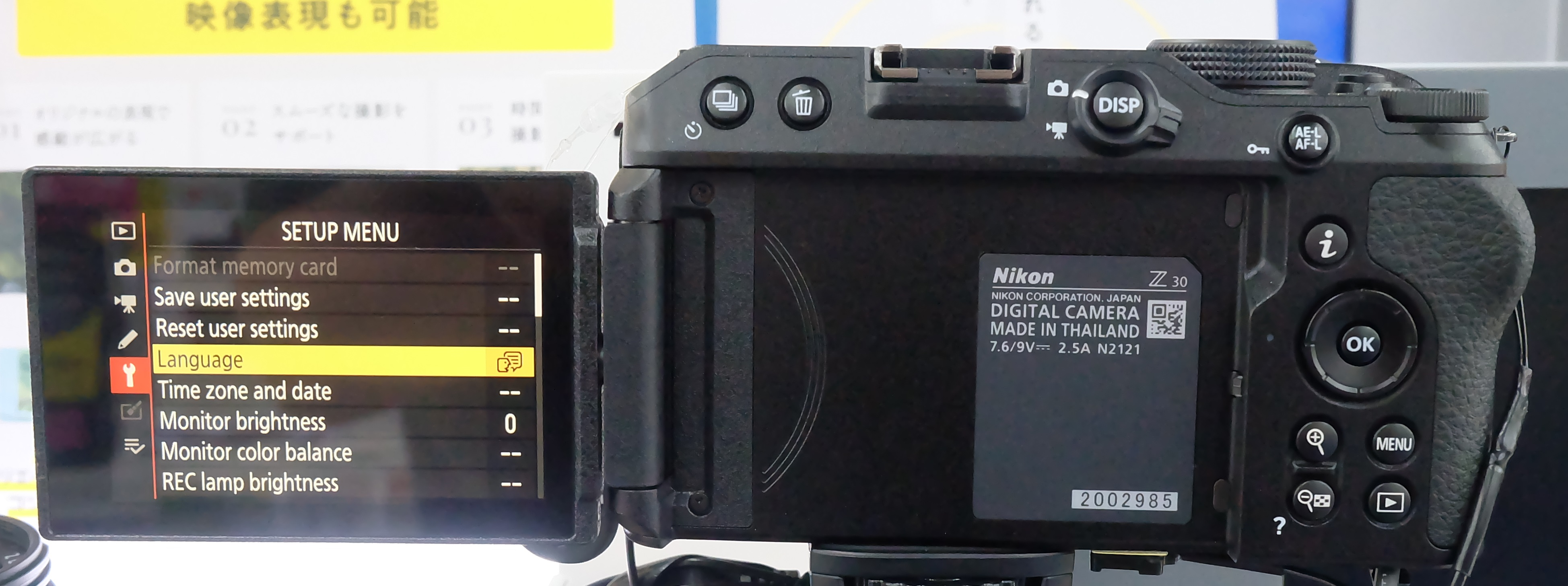

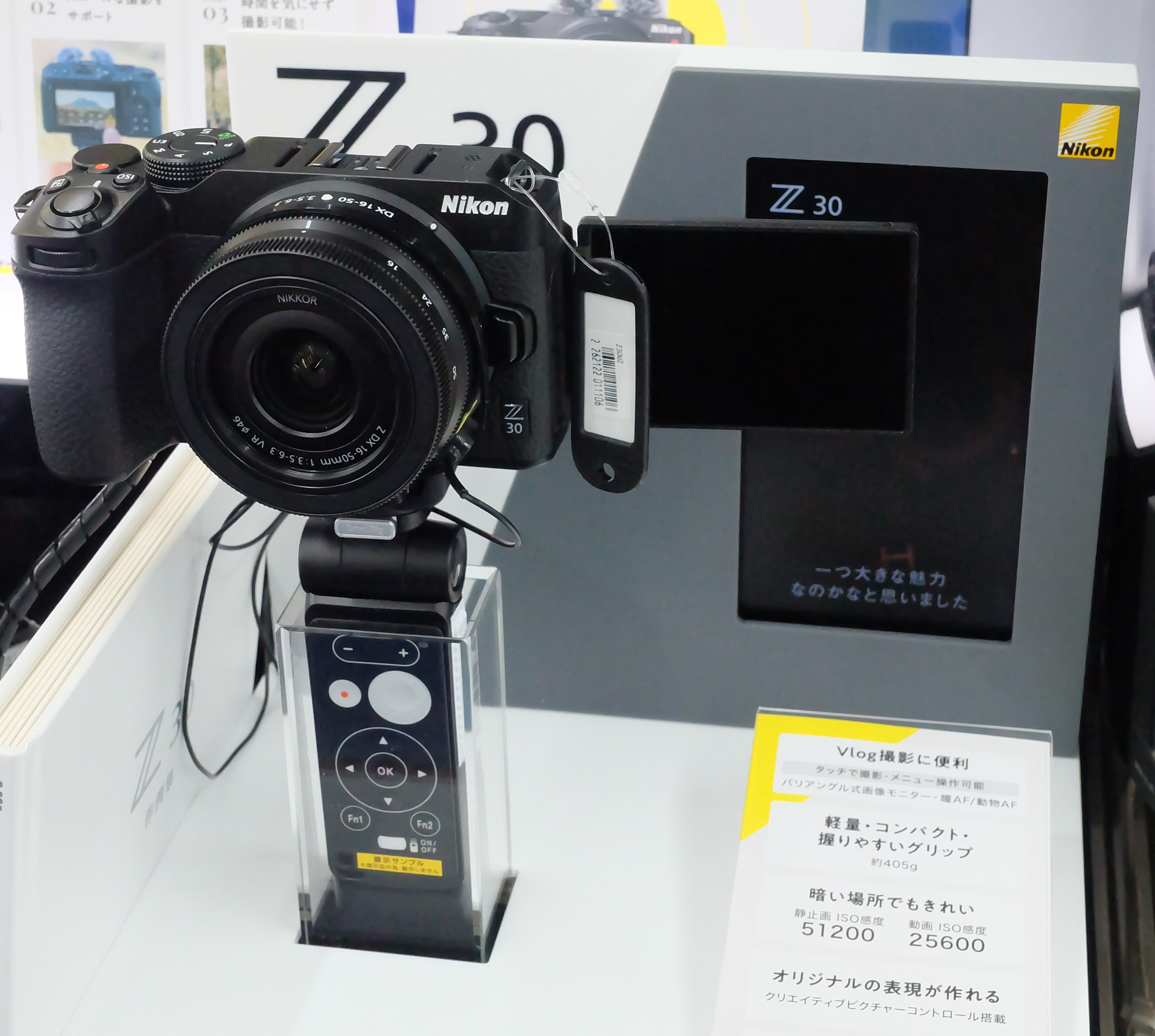

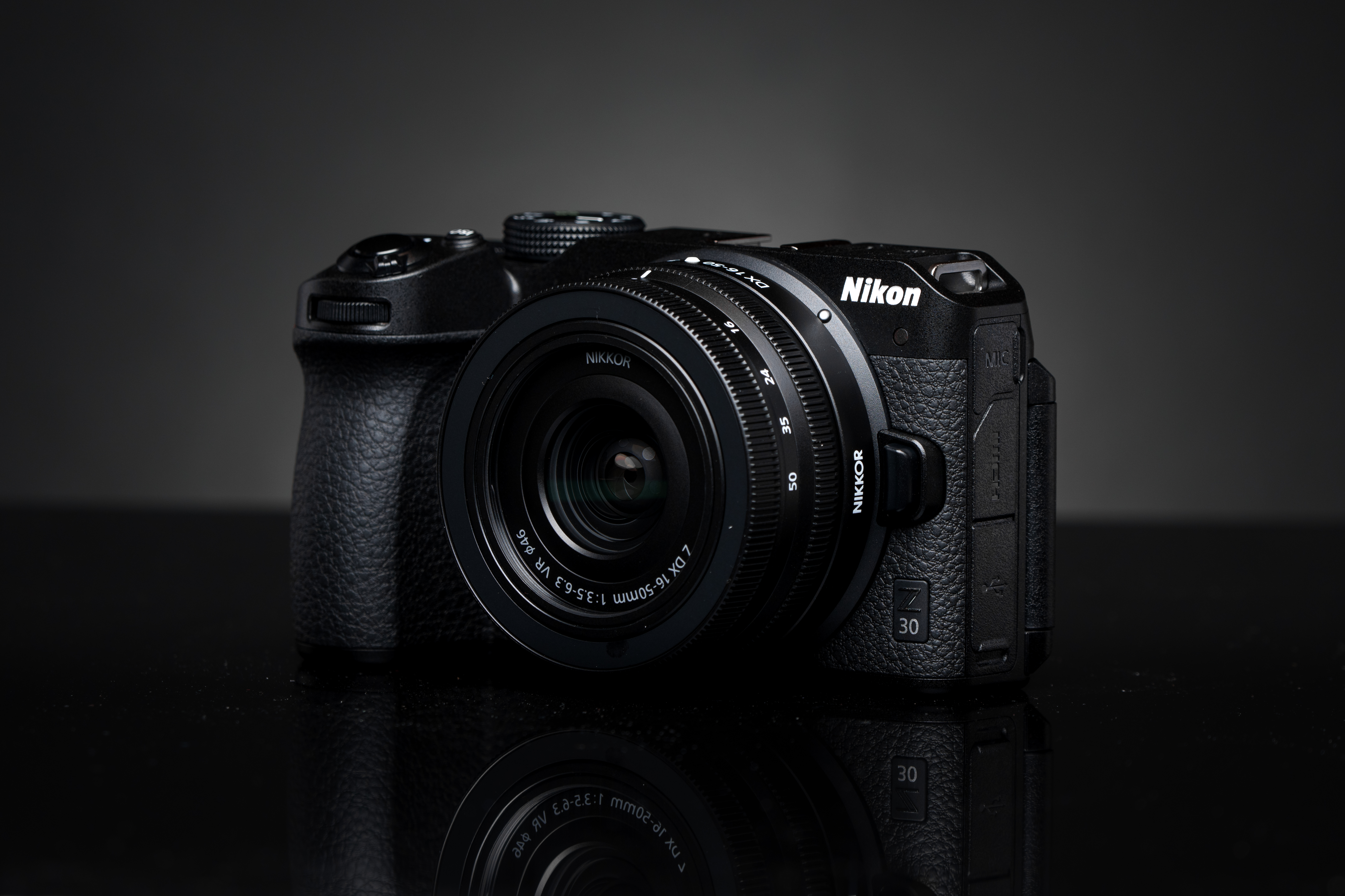

== Awards ==
The Z30 was awarded with:

- the TIPA World Awards 2023 for "BEST APS-C VLOGGER CAMERA"
- the Red Dot Award for Product Design 2023
- the iF Design Award 2023, for its outstanding product design.

== Marketing slogans ==
When the Z30 was launched, Nikon used the following marketing slogans:

- English: “Creator Ready.”,
- Japanese: “本気であそぼう。”. ("Let's play seriously")

Sensor	Class	2018	2019	2020	2021	2022	2023	2024	2025	2026
FX (Full-frame)	Flagship					^{8K} Z9 ^{S}				
FX (Full-frame)	Flagship							^{8K} Z8 ^{S}		
FX (Full-frame)	Professional		^{4K} Z7 ^{S}		^{4K} Z7Ⅱ ^{S}					
FX (Full-frame)	Professional		^{4K} Z6 ^{S}		^{4K} Z6Ⅱ ^{S}				^{6K} Z6Ⅲ ^{S}	
FX (Full-frame)	Cinema									^{6K} ZR ^{S}
FX (Full-frame)	Enthusiast							^{4K} Zf ^{S}		
FX (Full-frame)	Enthusiast				^{4K} Z5 ^{S}					^{4K} Z5Ⅱ ^{S}
FX (Full-frame)	Entry-level									^{4K} Z5ⅡC ^{S}
DX (APS-C)	Enthusiast								^{4K} Z50Ⅱ	
DX (APS-C)	Enthusiast					^{4K} Zfc				
DX (APS-C)	Prosumer			^{4K} Z50						
DX (APS-C)	Entry-level						^{4K} Z30			
Sensor	Class									
Sensor	Class	2018	2019	2020	2021	2022	2023	2024	2025	2026
