= Jitter (disambiguation) =

Jitter is the deviation in frequency of a signal.

Jitter(s) may also refer to:

- Jitter (optics), the oscillatory motion of the image with respect to the detector, which blurs the recorded image
- Delay jitter, in packet switched networks
- Fixation (visual) or retinal jitter, the maintaining of the visual gaze on a single location
- Jittered, a method of supersampling
- Jitters (band), a Belarusian band from the 1990s and the 2000s
- The Jitters, a Canadian band from the 1980s
- Jitter, a package included in the Max visual programming language
- Jitter (comics), a Marvel Comics character
- "Jitters" (Smallville), a 2001 TV episode
- Jitters, a 1997 film directed by Bob Saget
