= Smear (optics) =

In optics, smear is used to refer to motion that has low temporal frequency relative to the integration/exposure time. This typically results from a relative rate of the image with respect to the detector (e.g., caused by movement in the scene). Smear is typically differentiated from jitter, which has a higher frequency relative to the integration time. Whereas smear refers to a relatively constant rate during the integration/exposure time, jitter refers to a relatively sinusoidal motion during the integration/exposure time.

The equation for the optical modulation transfer function associated with smear is the standard sinc function associated with an extended sample

$$\mathrm{MTF}_\mathrm{smear}(u) = \frac {\sin(\pi \alpha u)} {\pi \alpha u}$$

where u is the spatial frequency and $\alpha$ is the amplitude of the smear in pixels.
