= Image-stabilized binoculars =

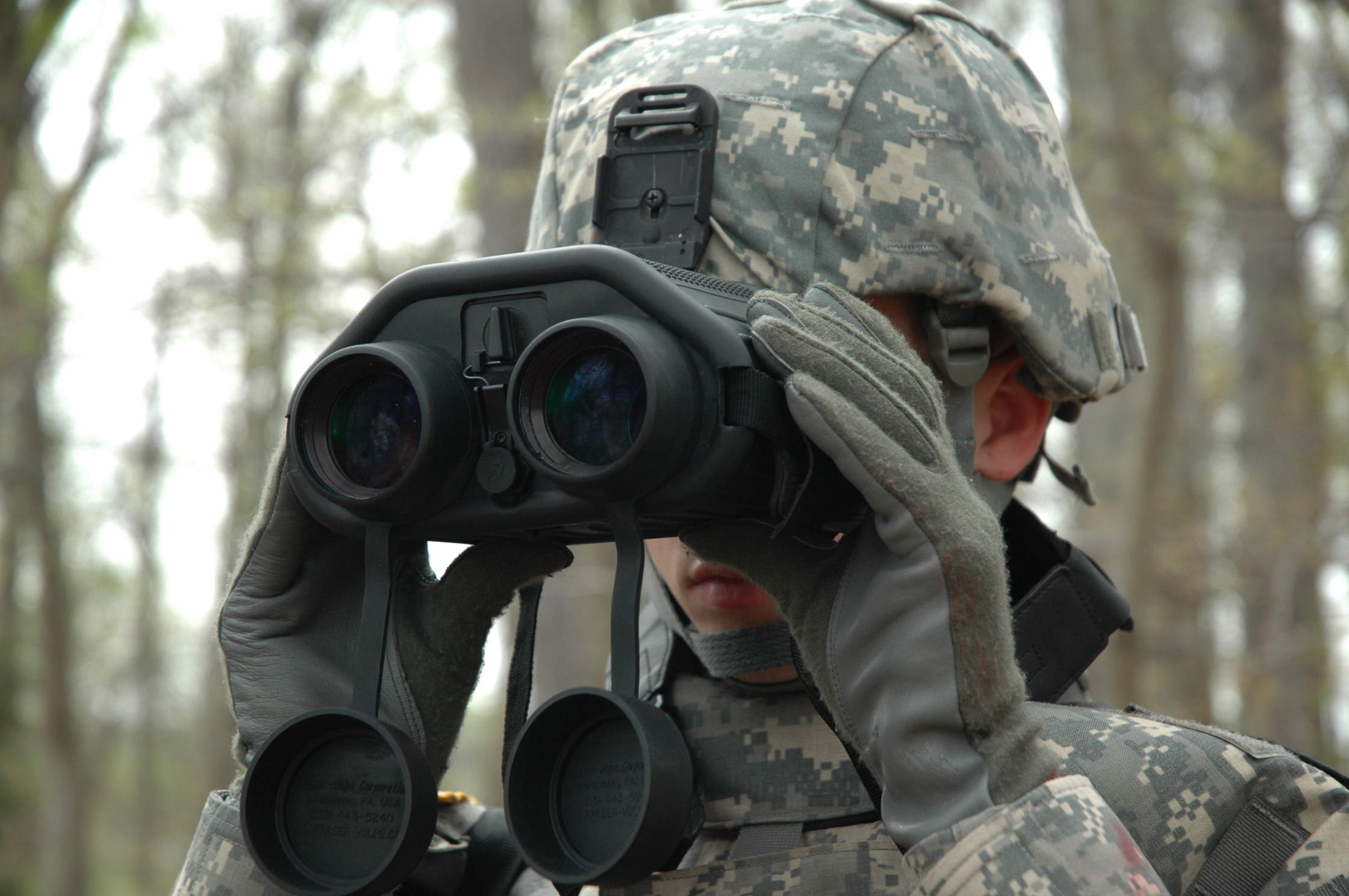
A U.S. Army soldier uses M25 stabilized binoculars.

Image-stabilized binoculars are binoculars that have a mechanism for decreasing the apparent motion of the view due to binocular movement. Such binoculars are designed to minimize image shaking in hand-held applications. Higher-power binoculars magnify the image more, but the image shift is also increased. This means that even minor hand movements can cause huge image shifts. Image stabilization technology in binoculars ensures instant adjustment of the image to compensate for the motion. Major brands making image stabilized binoculars include Canon, Fujinon, Nikon, Carl Zeiss, and Bushnell.

Several different mechanisms have been used for image stabilization.

== Active systems ==
In these systems the change in attitude of the binoculars is sensed electronically, and some part of the system is changed to correct this offset. A lens group may be shifted, or the angle of a fluid filled prism may be changed.

== Passive systems ==
In these systems there is no feedback from a sensor to the corrective element. The whole binocular may be stabilized by use of a gyroscope, or the binocular prisms may be disengaged from the housings, allowing them to be unaffected by binocular movement.

== Use ==
Image-stabilized binoculars are frequently used when viewing from a moving object such as a boat or plane. They are also very helpful with high powered binoculars. Image stabilized binoculars have become popular with amateur astronomers.

== Other image-stabilized optics ==
Image stabilization is also used in video and camera lenses.

== See also ==
- Monocular
- Motion blur
- Telescope
- Spotting scope
