= Nocticron =

Panasonic Leica DG Nocticron 1:1.2/42.5 Aspheric / Power O.I.S.
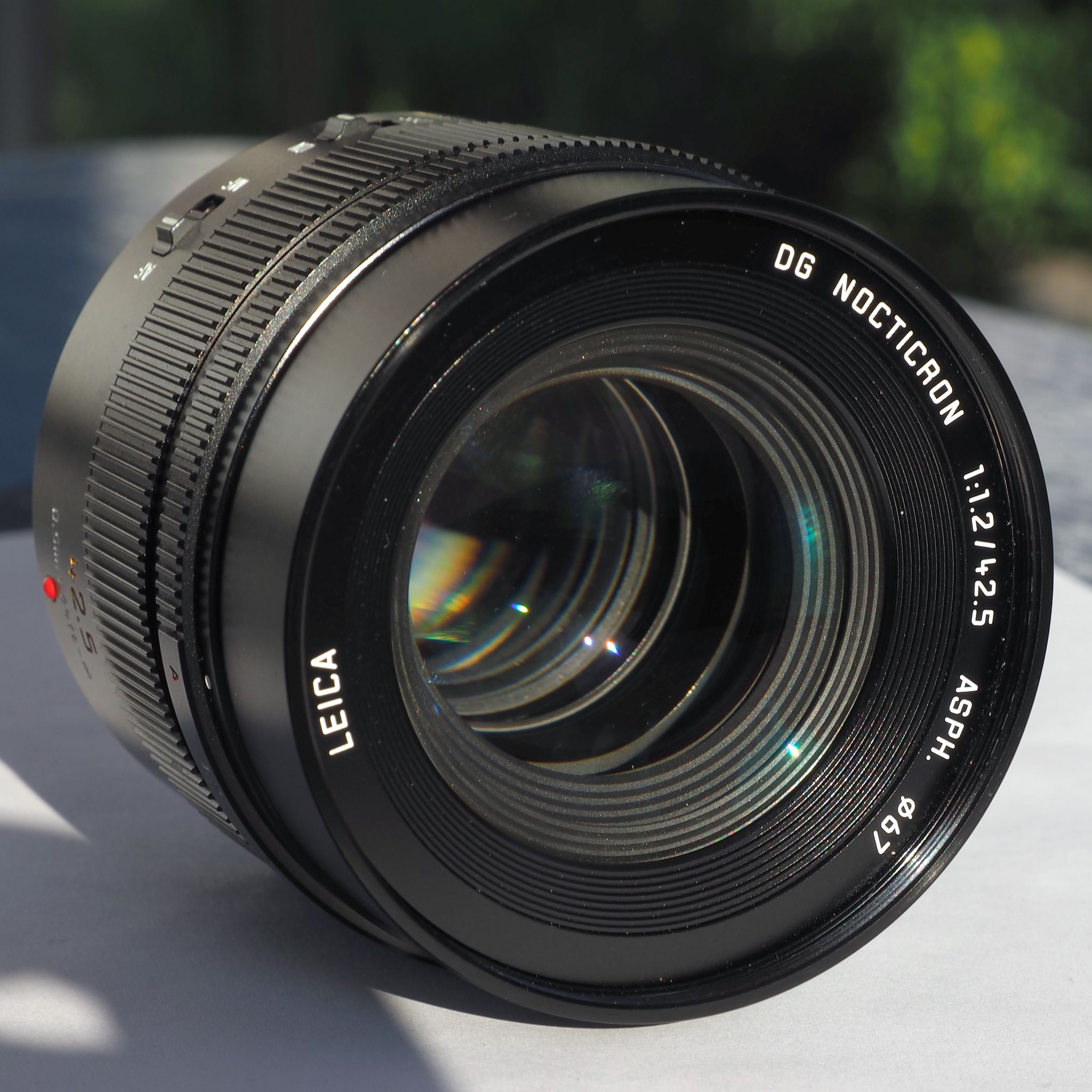
- Maker: Panasonic
- Lens mount: Micro Four Thirds

Technical data
- Type: tele prime
- Focus drive: stepper
- Focal length: 42.5 mm
- Focal length (35mm equiv.): 85 mm
- Crop factor: 2
- Aperture (max/min): f/1.2 / f/16
- Close focus distance: 0.5 m
- Max. magnification: 0.1
- Diaphragm blades: 9, circular
- Construction: 14 elements in 11 groups

Features
- Ultrasonic motor: Yes Yes
- Weather-sealing: No No
- Lens-based stabilization: Yes Yes
- Macro capable: No No
- Unique features: aspheric / dual image stabilisation
- Application: portrait / night shots

Physical
- Max. length: 77 mm
- Diameter: 74 mm
- Weight: 425 g
- Filter diameter: 67 mm

Accessories
- Lens hood: included
- Case: included

History
- Introduction: 2014

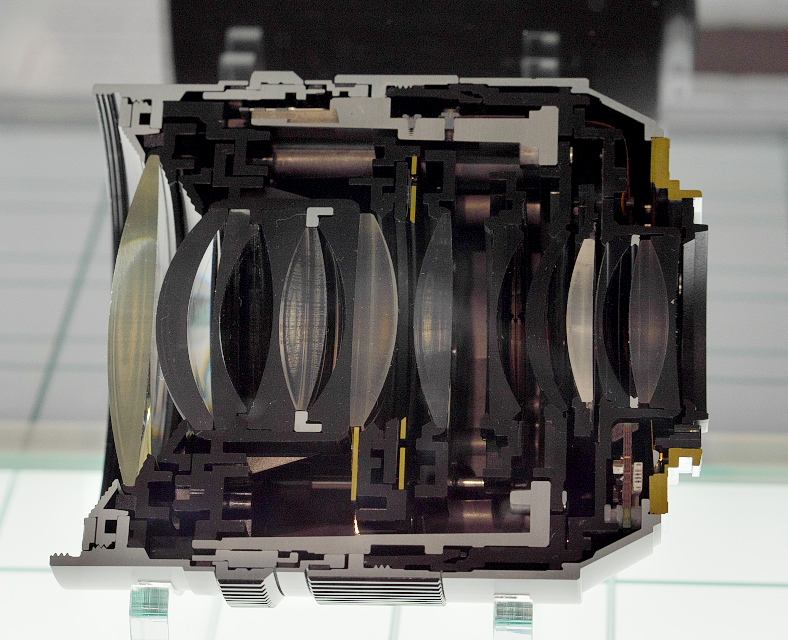
Cutaway of a Leica Nocticron 42,5 mm f/1.2

Nocticron ("Night-time" from Latin nox, noctis "night" and ancient Greek kronos "time") is the brand name of Leica lenses with an extreme speed of f/1.2. Because of the large aperture size and its image stabilisation system it is possible to take images with relatively short exposure time especially in available light situations. Together with the high number of nine diaphragm blades the lens creates a strong and pleasant bokeh.

== Market position ==
Nocticron lenses are slower than Noctilux lenses (f/0,95 or f/1,0) and faster than the Leica-lenses with the brand name Summilux (f/1,4), Summicron (f/2,0) and Elmarit (f/2,8).

== Description ==
Nocticron prime lenses are offered as exchangeable lenses for the Micro Four Thirds system (MFT). At photokina 2012 the model Lumix Leica DG Nocticron 1:1,2/42.5 mm ASPH was announced, and it is available since 2014.

Leica lenses with the model name attribute DG are made by Panasonic under license.

The lens has a smooth focusing ring as well as a clicked aperture ring. It is relatively large and heavy, and is not water or dust proof.

The anti-reflective coating of the telephoto lens with 1.7 times normal focal length has 14 lenses in 11 groups, two of them aspheric and another with extremely low dispersion. The front lens is made of extremely high refracting glass. The Nocticron has an excellent image quality.

The Nocticron lenses allow a fast lens-body communication for autofocusing with its rather silent stepper motor, due to the large aperture size also at low light conditions.

Minimum and maximum aperture

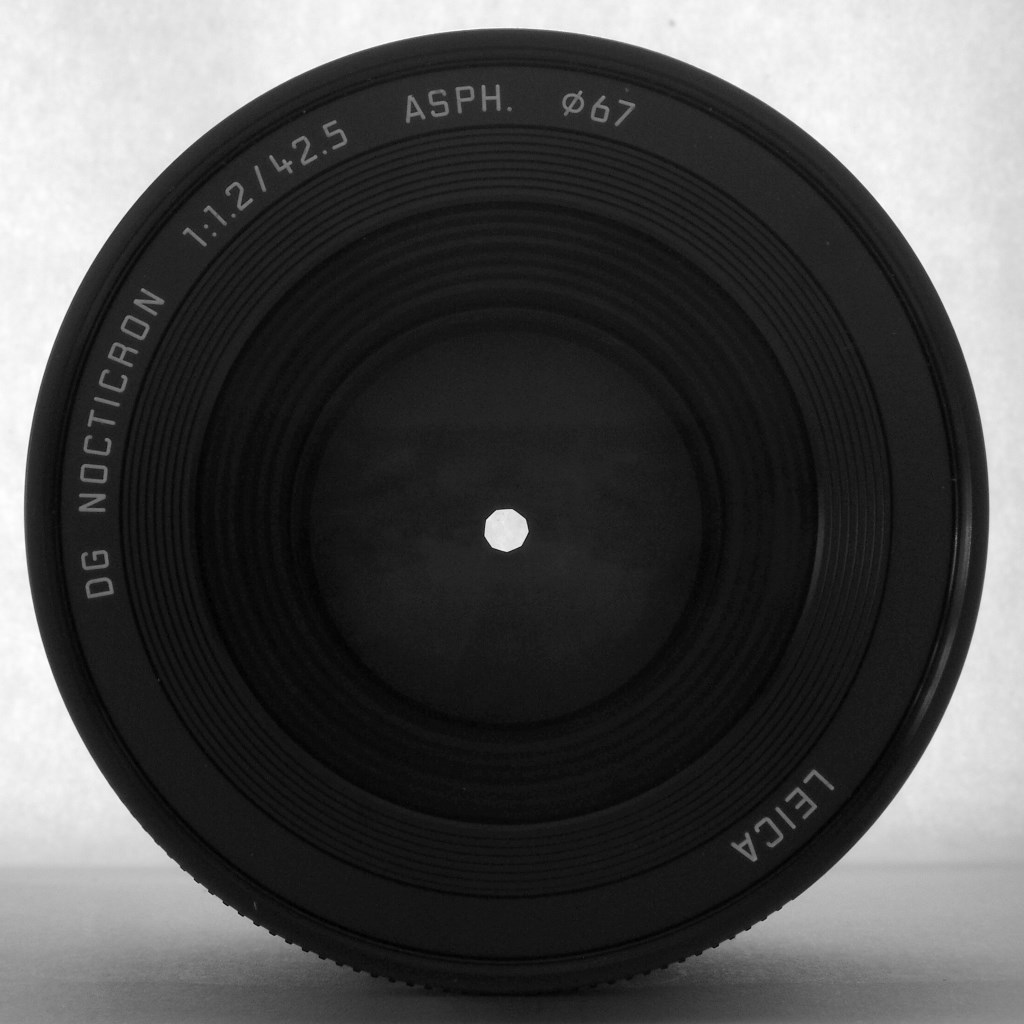
Minimum aperture of the Noctricron 42.5 mm (F-number 16)

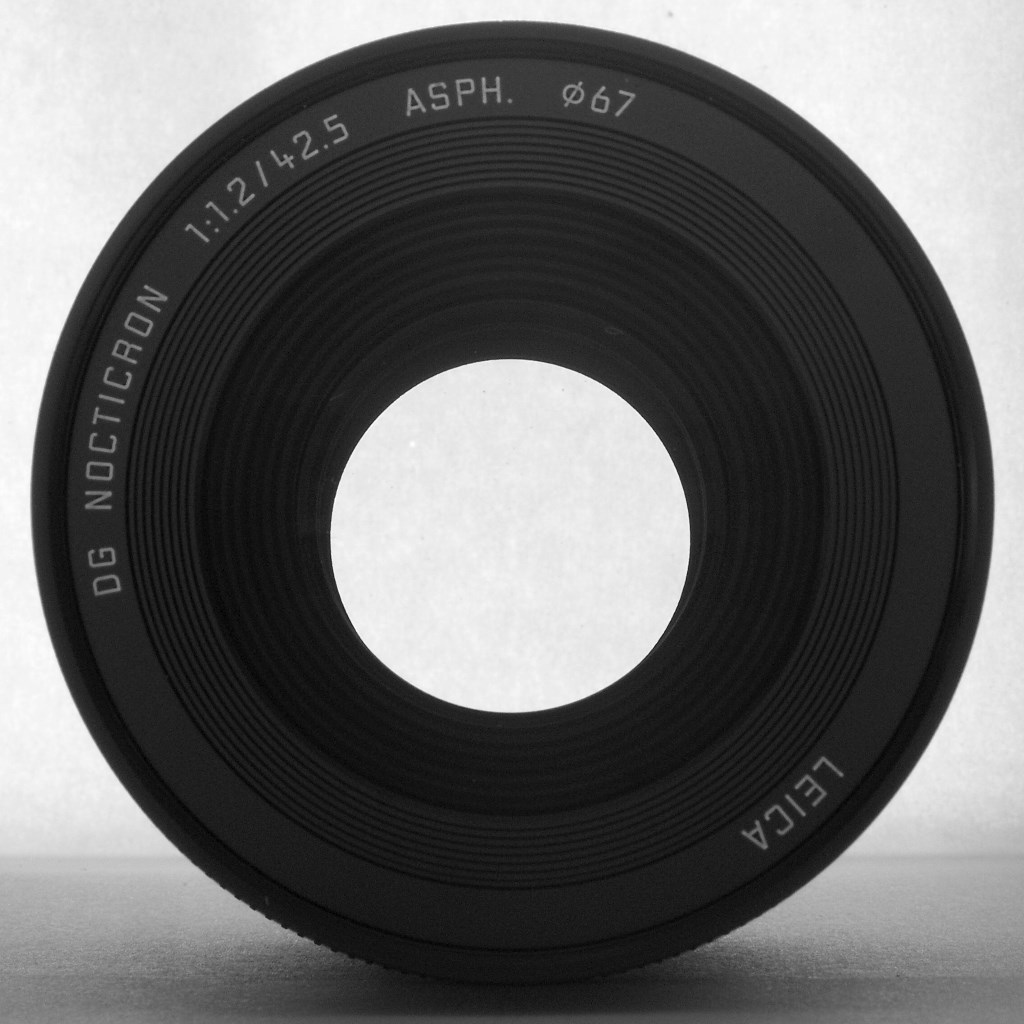
Maximum aperture of the Noctricron 42.5 mm (F-number 1,2)

=== Image stabilisation ===
As of March 2023, while there are other f/1.2 autofocus lenses, it is still the fastest lens with both image stabilisation and autofocus.

The optical image stabilisation of the lens can even be combined with the opto-mechanical image stabilisation systems of some camera bodies of the system (Dual Image Stabilisation = Dual I.S.). The ‘’Dual I.S.’’ mode can be used only if the firmware of the Nocticron has version 1.2 or higher.

== Gallery ==
The following images show some extraordinary capabilities of the Nocticron such as at low light, at high speed, for strong bokeh or with image stabilisation.

Images taken with a Nocticron, focal length = 42.5 mm, F-number = 1.2

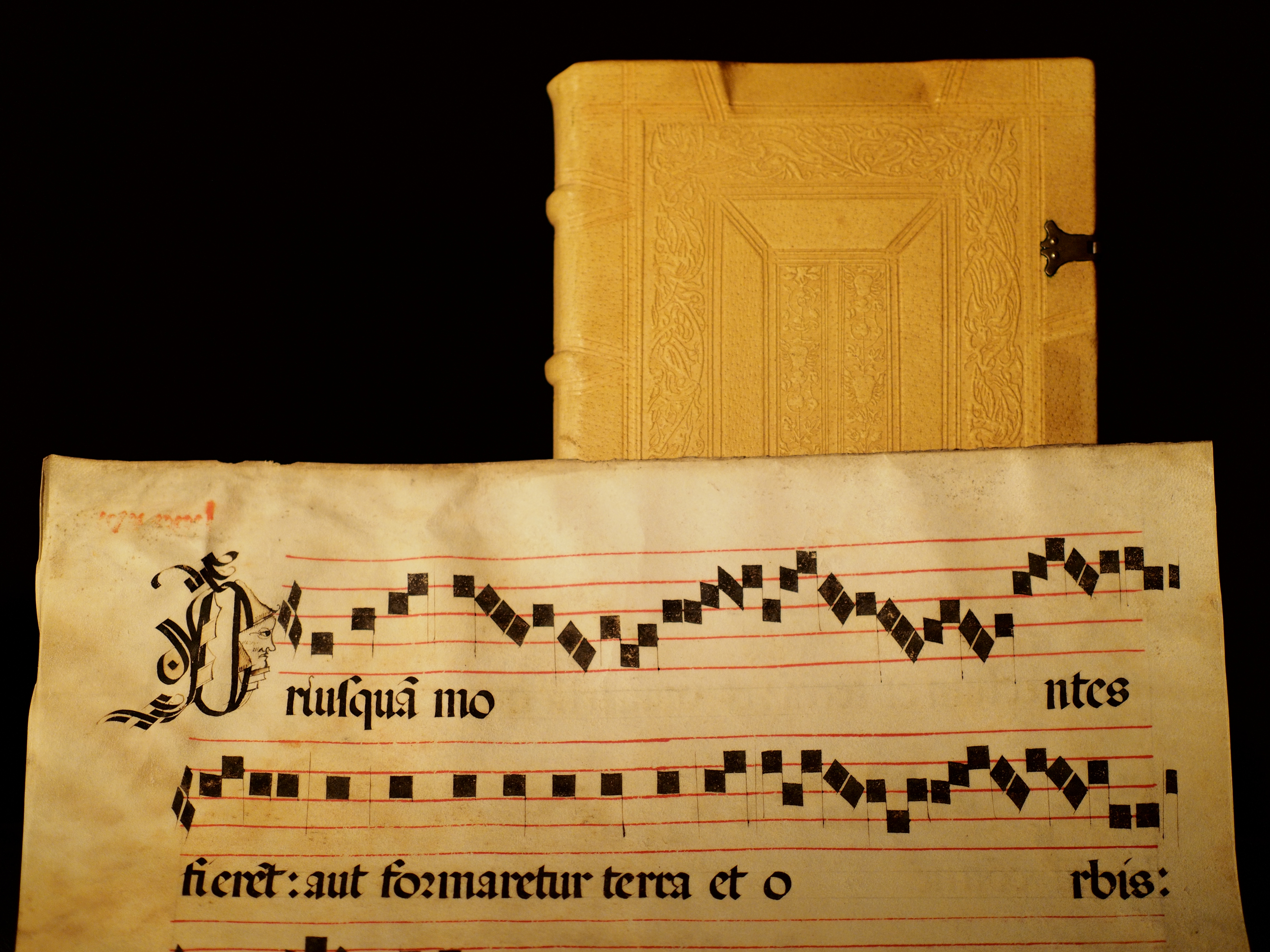
Still life with parchment and book in candle light, ISO speed = 200, exposure time = 1.3 s, exposure value = -1. The illuminance level on the parchment was below 1 lux.

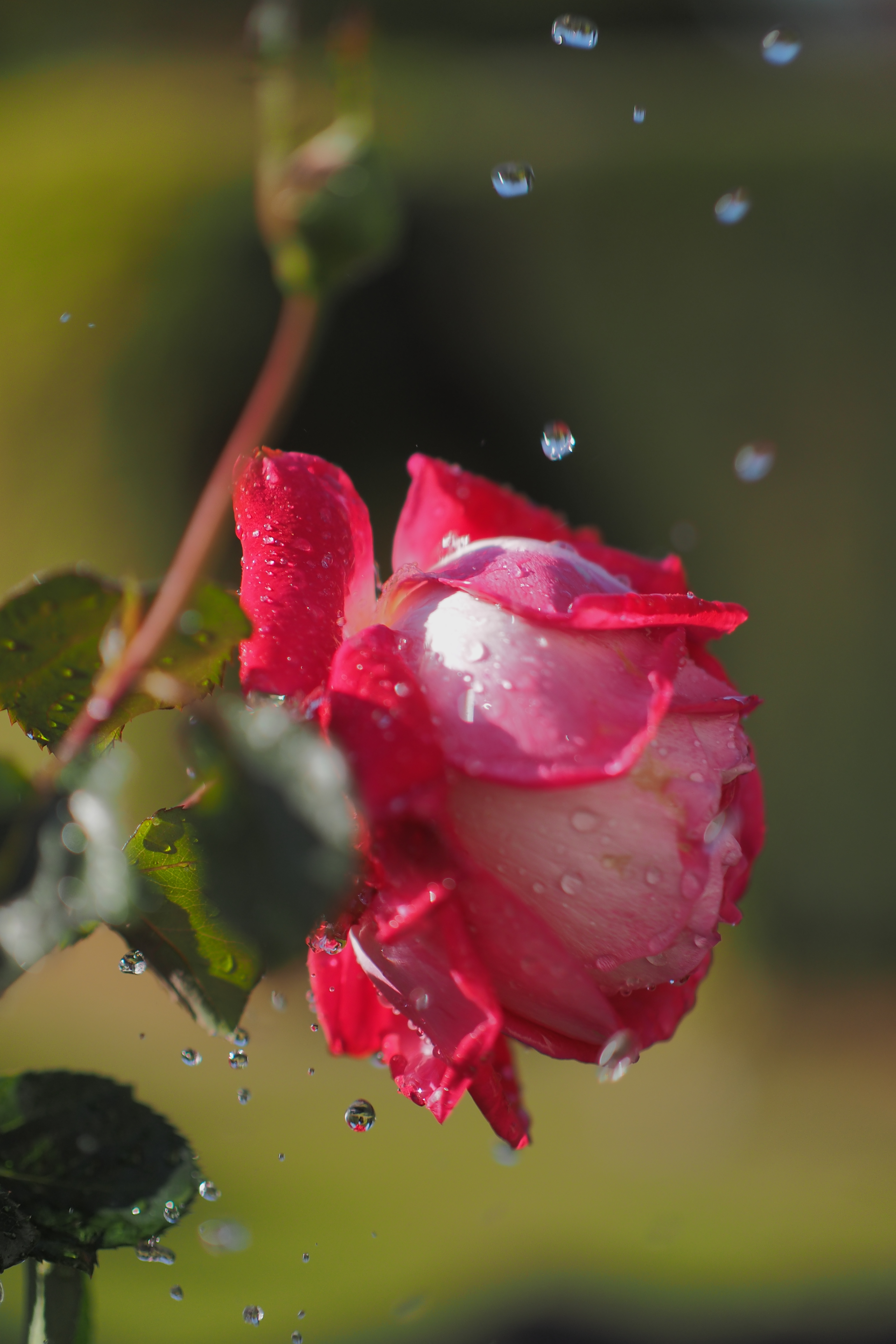
Rose with water drops in sun light, ISO speed = 200, exposure time = 1/8000 s, exposure value = 12.5.

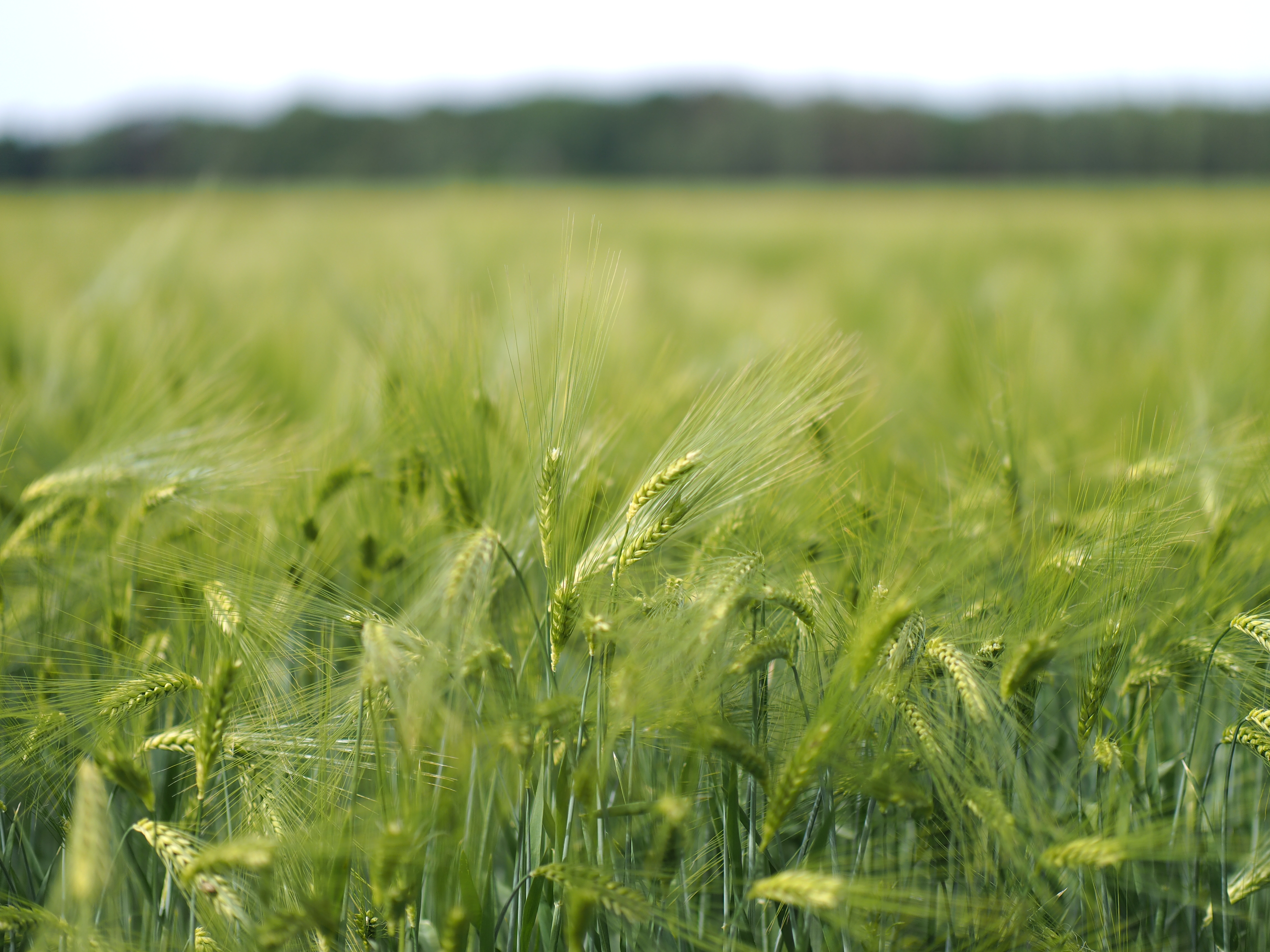
Wheat field in strong wind with bokeh, ISO speed = 200, exposure time = 1/4000 s, exposure value = 11.5.

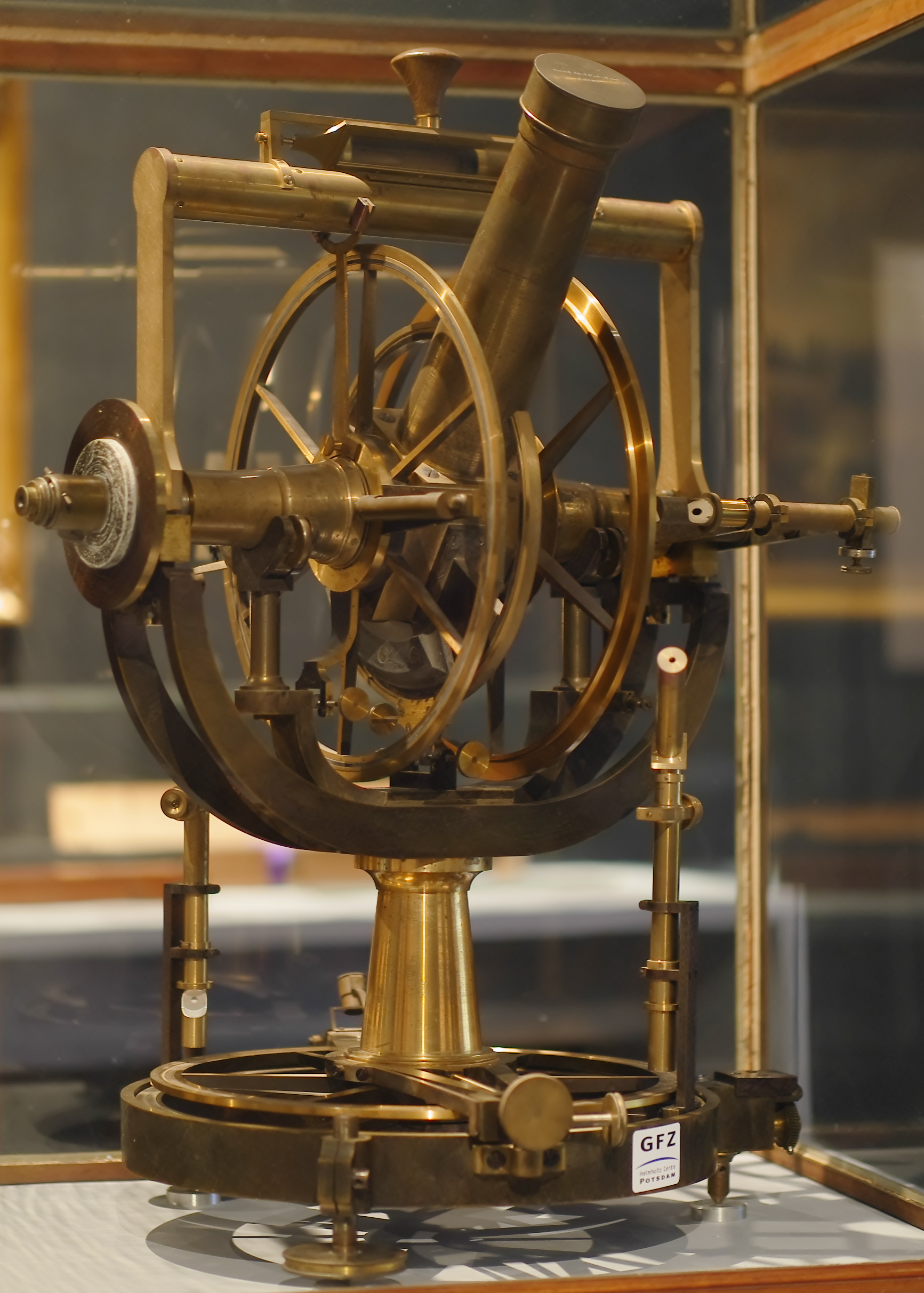
Free-hand taken museum shot of a historic universal theodolite in a display case with transparent glass taken with a polarizing filter, ISO speed = 800, exposure time = 1/8 s, exposure value = 0.5.

== Comparison ==
Compared to other camera systems with differing normal focal lengths, and therefore different image sensor sizes, the following equivalent values apply to lenses with appropriate properties as the Nocticron 42,5 mm 1,2 within the Micro-Four-Thirds system (MFT). With the parameters given in the table in all camera systems the photographer will get the same angle of view, depth of field, diffraction limitation and motion blur:

Image sensor format	Focal lengths at the same angle of view (diagonal angle ≈ 29°)	F-number at the same depth of field and diffraction limitation	ISO speed at the same exposure time
Nikon CX	31 mm	0.85	100
MFT	42.5 mm	1.2	200
APS-C	57 mm	1.6	360
Full frame	85 mm	2.4	800
