= Panasonic Lumix DMC-TZ18 =

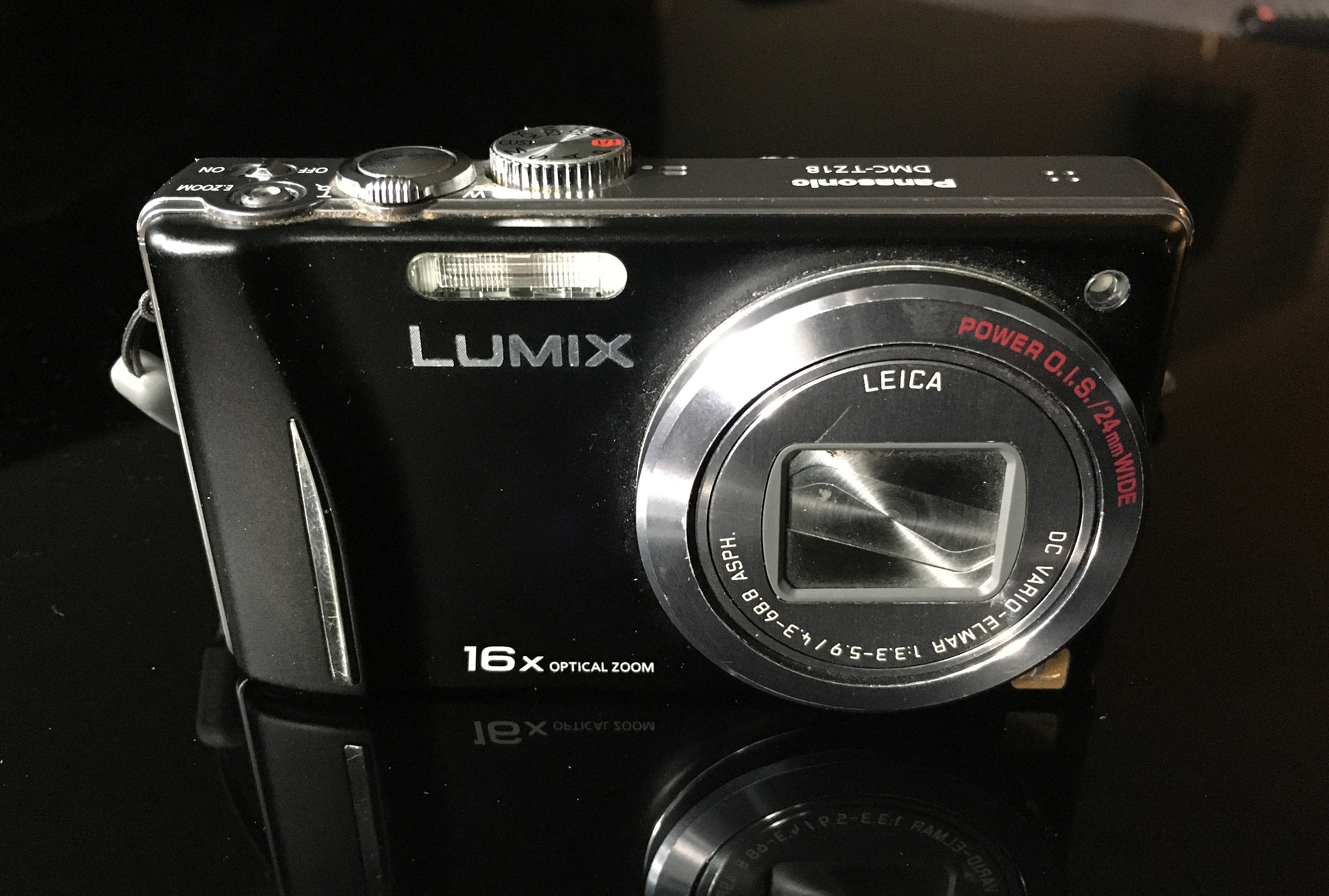

Overview
- Maker: Panasonic Lumix
- Type: Compact

Lens
- Lens mount: LEICA DC VARIO-ELMAR
- F-numbers: 3.3 - 5.9

Sensor/medium
- Sensor type: CCD
- Sensor size: 14.1 megapixels
- Storage media: SD, SDHC, SDXC

Focusing
- Focus modes: Normal / AF Macro, Zoom Macro, Quick AF, AF Tracking / AF Continuous (only movies)
- Focus areas: Normal: 50 cm - infinity / 200 cm - infinity / Macro / Intelligent AUTO / movies: 3 cm - infinity / 100 cm - infinity

Flash
- Flash: built-in

Shutter
- Frame rate: 10
- Shutter speeds: 60 - 1/4000

General
- LCD screen: 3.0" TFT Screen LCD
- Battery: Li-ion Battery Pack ID-Security (3,6 V, 895 mAh)
- Dimensions: 104,9 x 57,6 x 33,4 mm
- Weight: 210 g (7 oz) with Battery and SD Memory Card

Panasonic Lumix DMC-TZ18 (or DMC-ZS8 in North America) is a digital camera by Panasonic Lumix from the year 2010. The highest-resolution pictures it records is 14.1 megapixels, through its 24mm Ultra Wide-Angle Leica DC VARIO-ELMAR zoom lens. The range of the focal length of the zoom lens from German company Leica Camera is from a strong wide angle with 24 mm (calculated equivalent to 35 mm film) up to the sixteenfold which is 384 mm, which amounts to a strongly magnifying telephoto lens.

== Property ==
- 24 mm LEICA DC
- 16x optical zoom
- 20x intelligent zoom
- iA (Intelligent Auto) mode
- HD movies

== Gallery ==
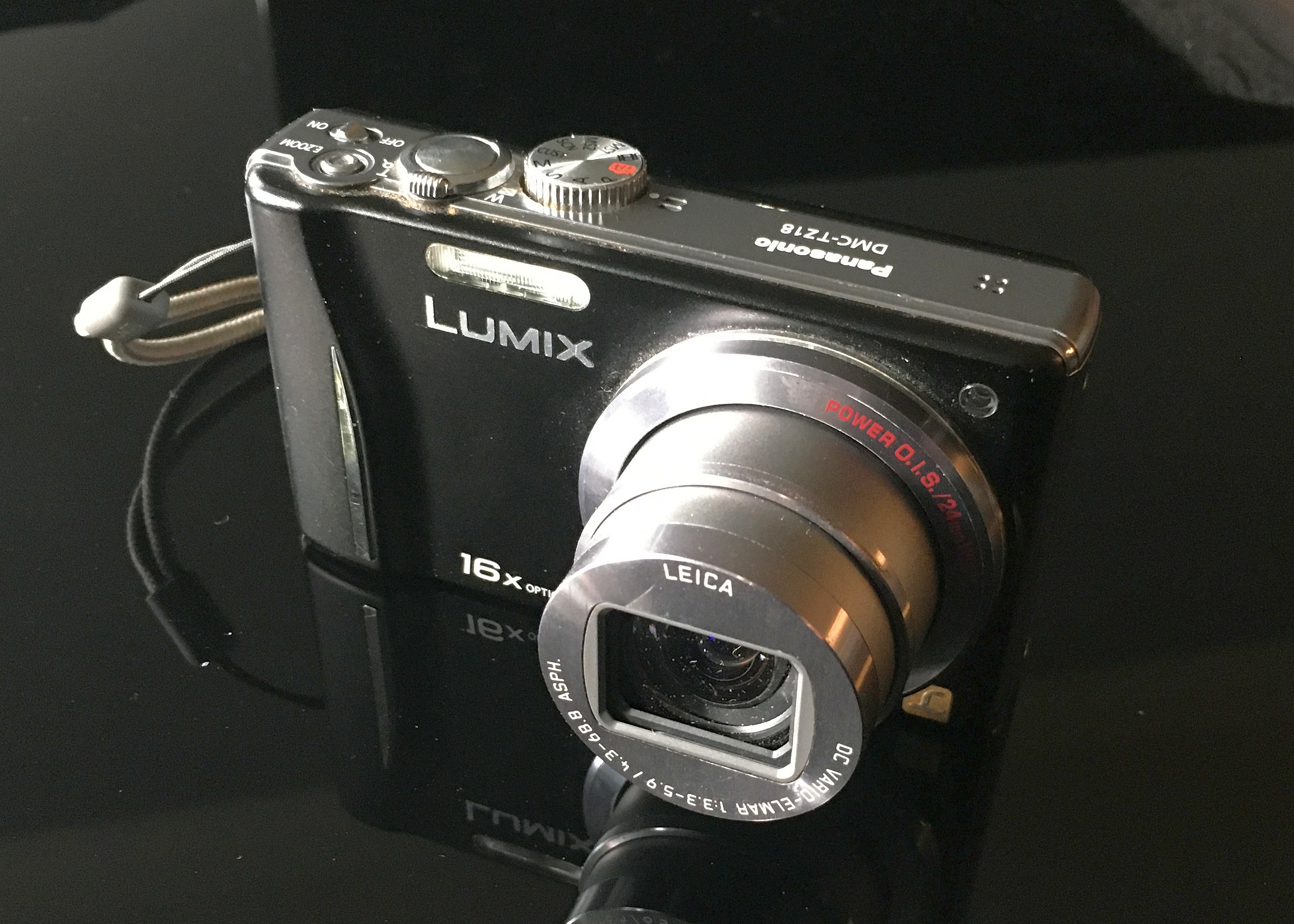
appearance after switching on in photography mode

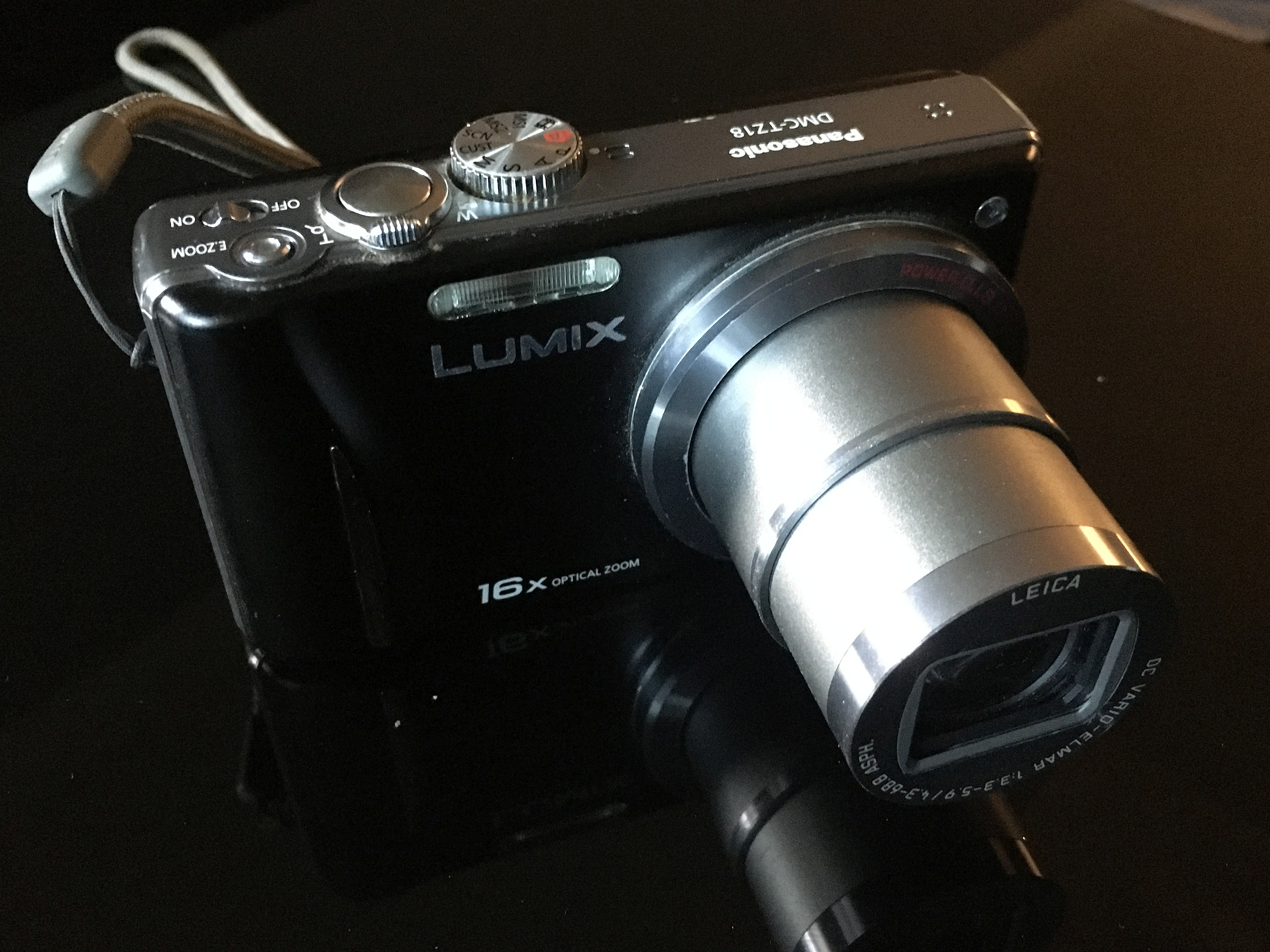
Zoom lens set to the maximum focal length of 384 mm (super tele)

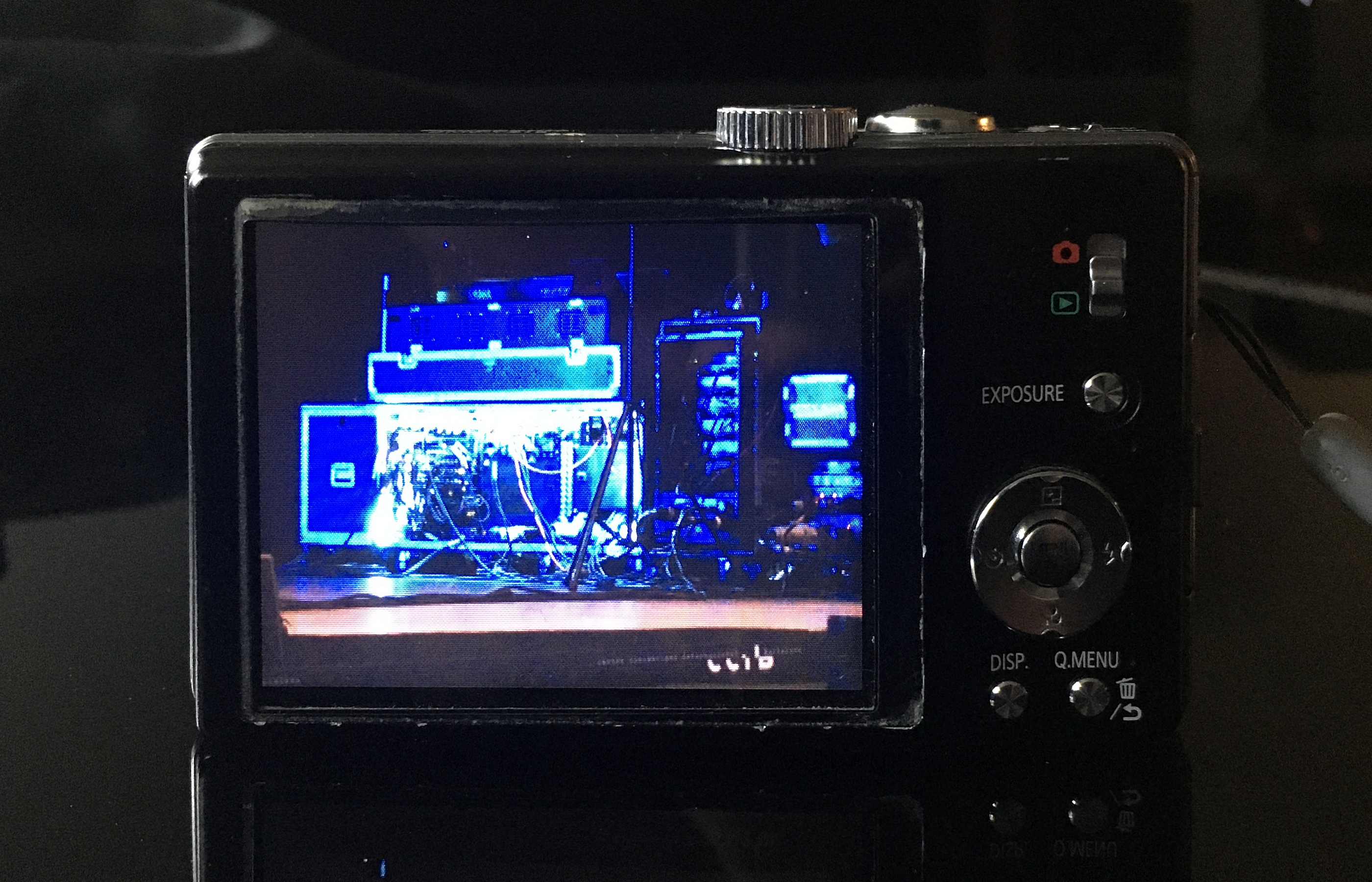
3.0 inch LCD screen showing an image stored on the SD card

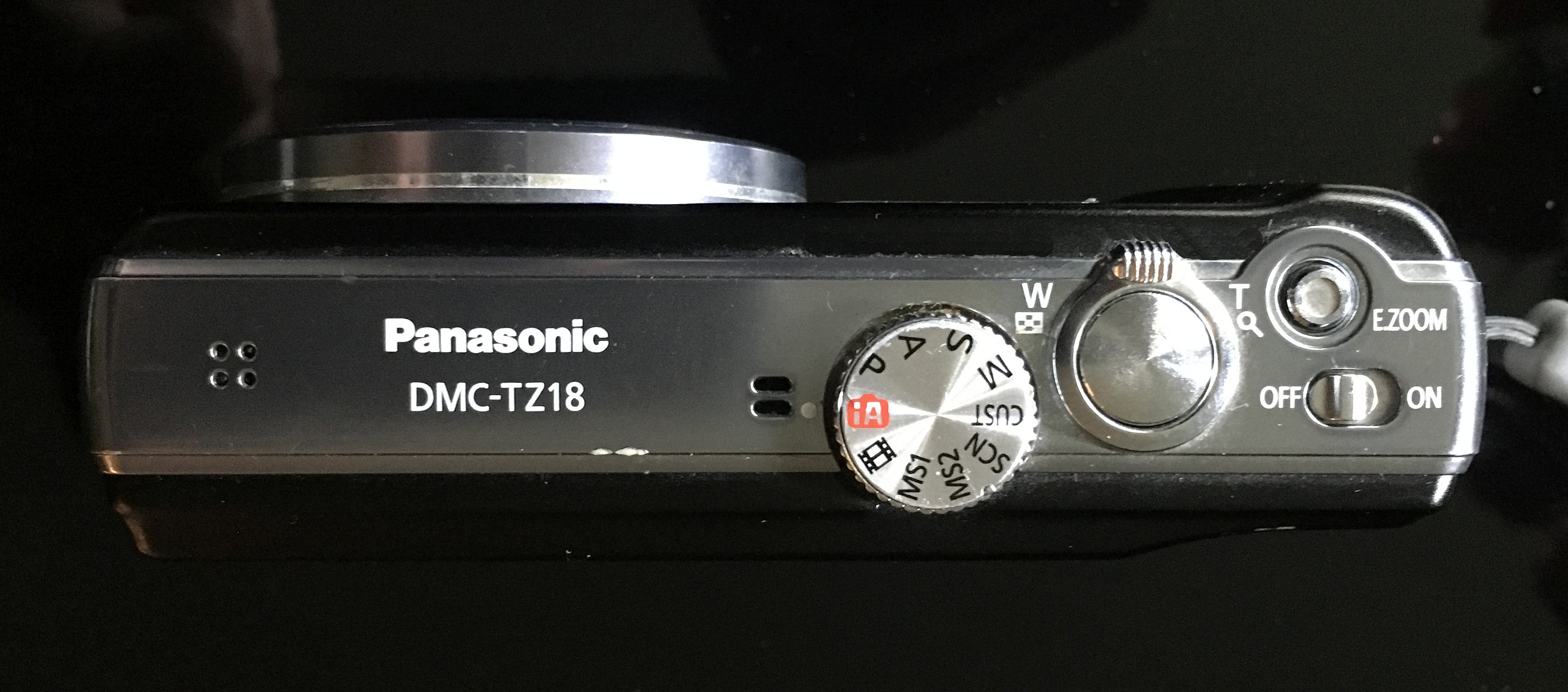
top view showing switches and knobs

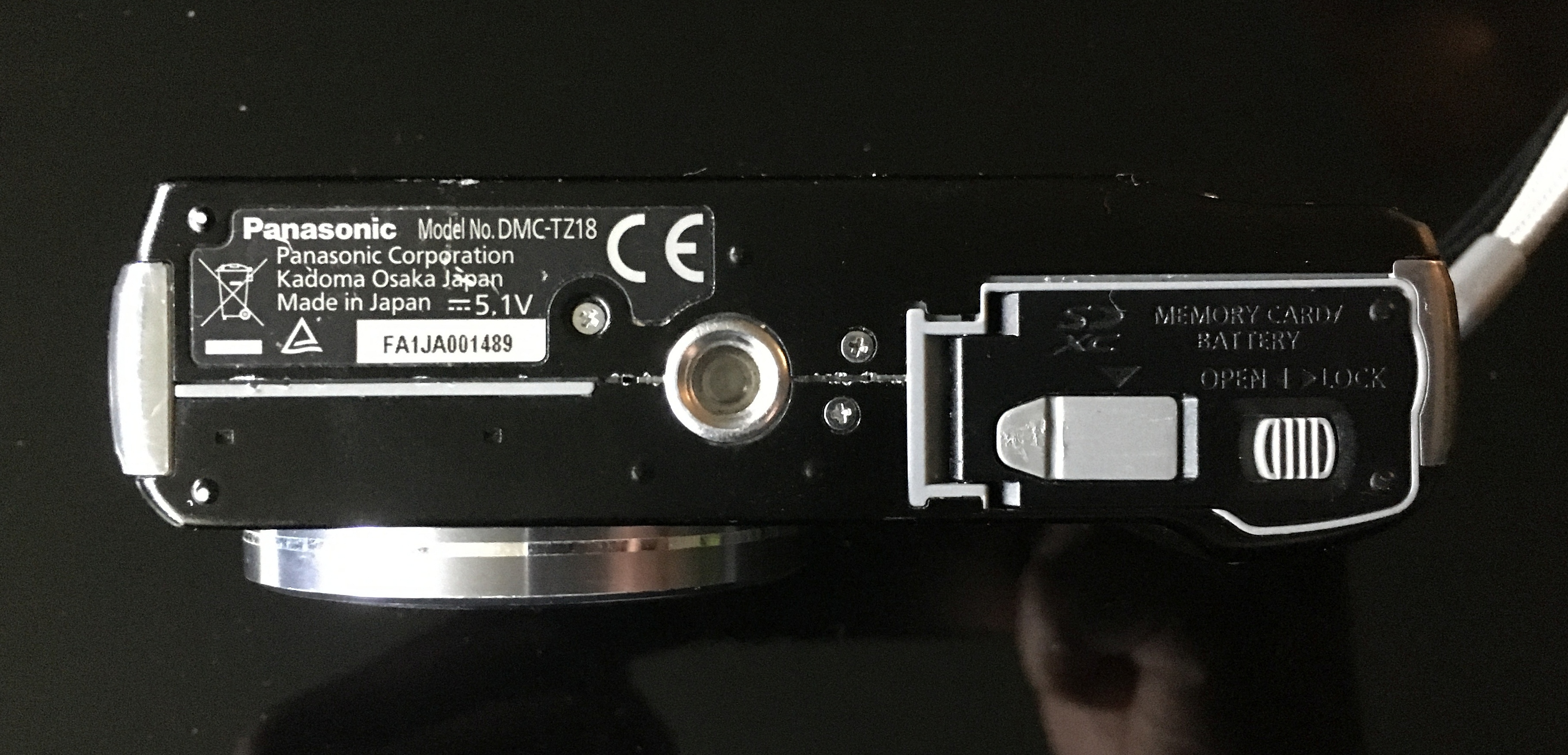
bottom view

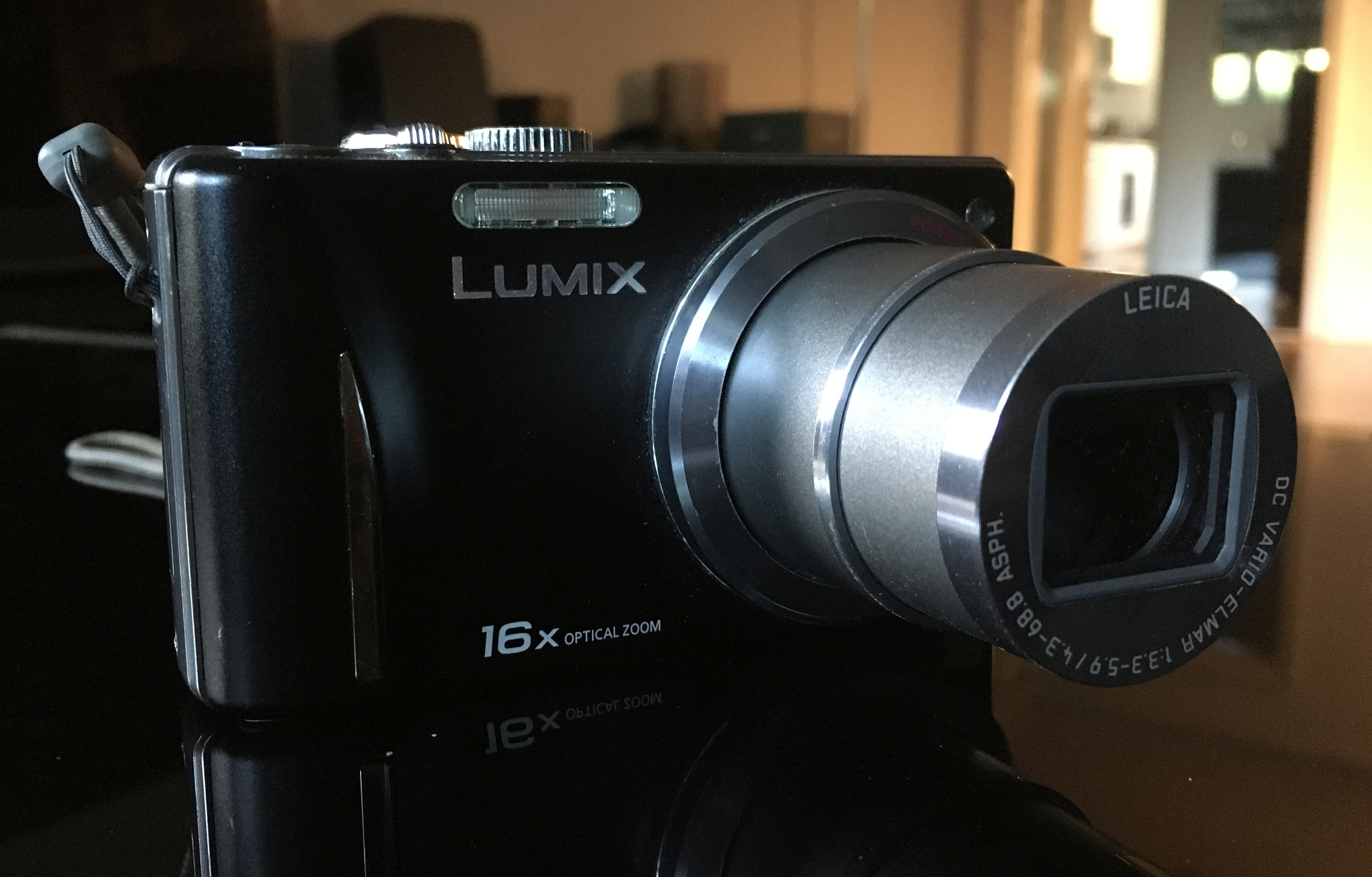
Maximum tele position of the adjustable lens

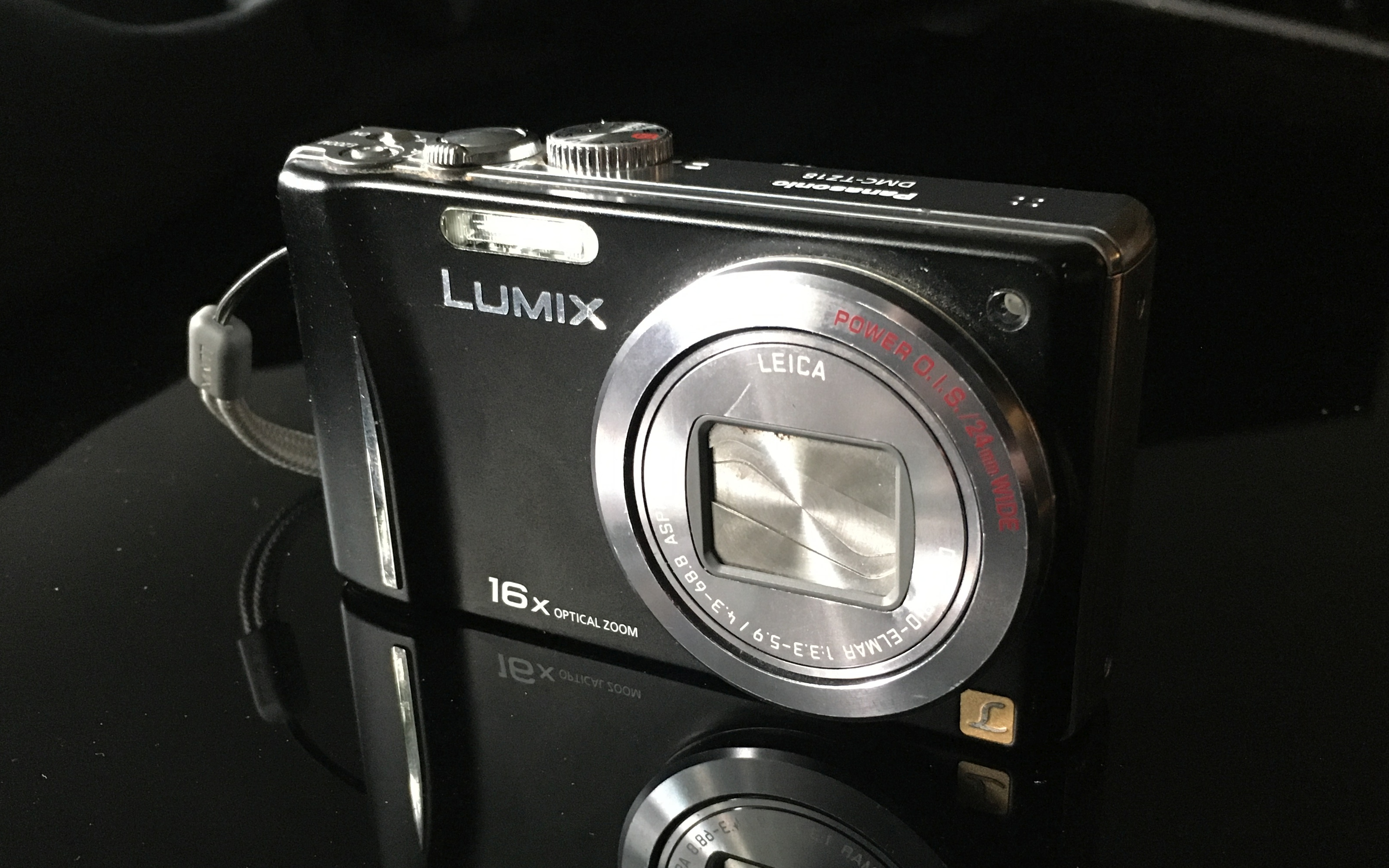

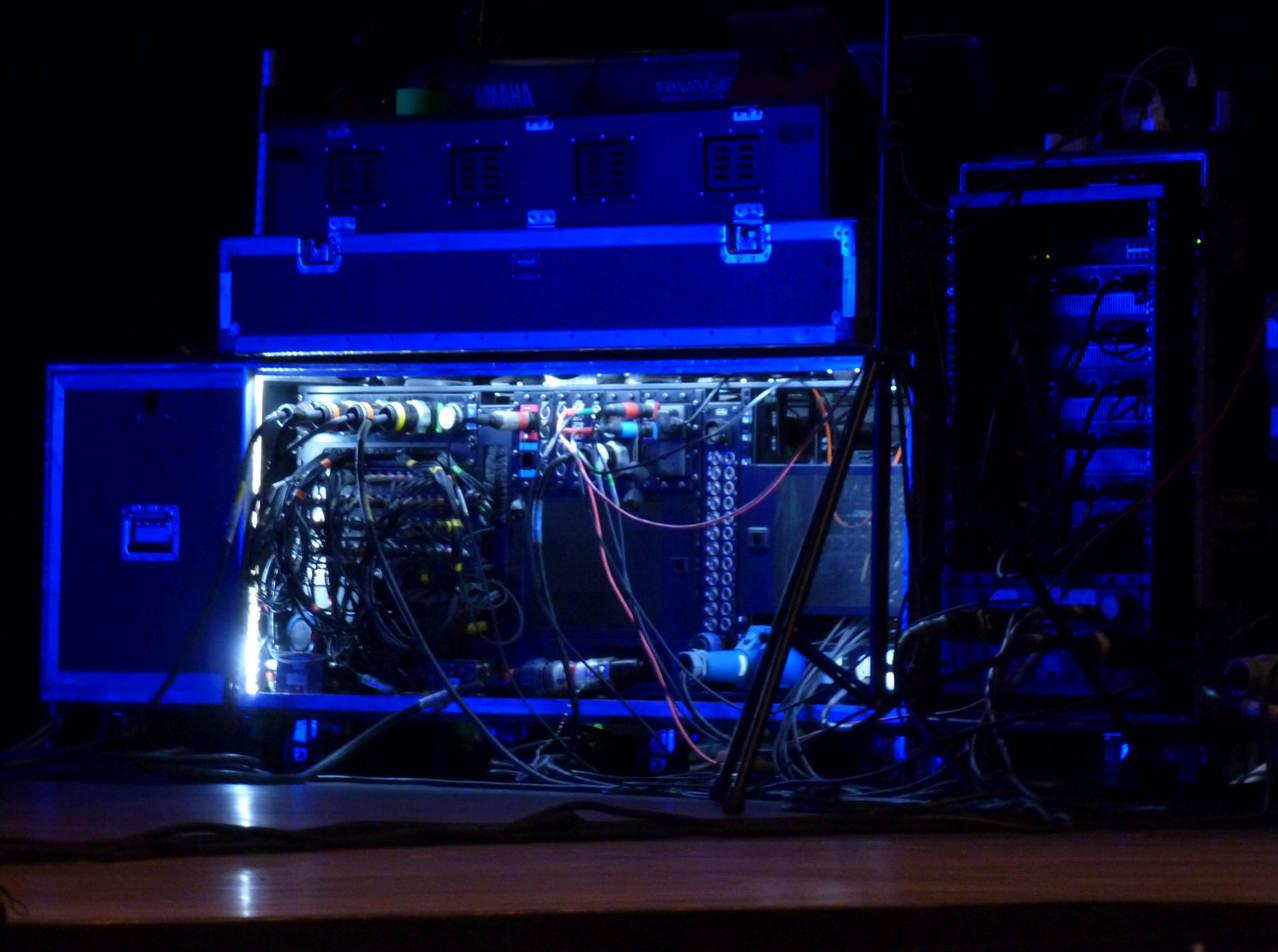
Image taken at a pop concert with 182 mm focal length at 1/4 second exposure time. Due to the activated image stabilizer, the picture is in focus.
