= Jitter (optics) =

In optics, jitter is used to refer to motion that has high temporal frequency relative to the integration/exposure time. This may result from vibration in an assembly or the unstable hand of a photographer. Jitter is typically differentiated from smear, which has a lower frequency relative to the integration time. Whereas smear refers to a relatively constant rate during the integration/exposure time, jitter refers to a relatively sinusoidal motion during the integration/exposure time.

The equation for the optical Modulation transfer function associated with jitter is

$$MTF_{jitter}(k) =e^{-\frac {1} {2} k^2\sigma^2}$$

where k is the spatial frequency and $\sigma$ is the amplitude of the jitter. Note that this frequency is in radians of phase per cycle. The equivalent expression in Hz is

$$MTF_{jitter}(u) =e^{-2 \pi^2 u^2\sigma^2}$$

where u is the spatial frequency and $\sigma$ is again the amplitude of the jitter (note that as the jitter approaches infinity, the value of the function tends towards zero).

For spacecraft, operation in a vacuum often means low mechanical damping. Meanwhile, spacecraft are compact and rigid, to withstand high launch loads. Jitter, then, is transmitted easily and often a limiting factor for high-resolution optics.
