= Integration time =

Concept in astronomy

Star trail images like this one taken by the ISS are taken with a long integration time, making the stars appear to move due to Earth's rotation

In astronomy, integration time or exposure time is the duration for which photons from a source are collected. A longer integration time means that more photons are collected in total. It is analogous to the term shutter speed in photography; however, astronomical observations generally require a much longer integration time than traditional photography, and the total integration time may be segmented into multiple different observations. Higher integration time results in a higher signal-to-noise ratio for an observation. Integration time is particularly relevant in radio astronomy, where the signal may be much smaller than the background noise for a short observation.

Integration time can also refer to the duration of time for which the photons for each pixel of an image are collected in the case of radio telescopes and charge-coupled devices, which only collect information for one pixel at a time.

Integration time can be a challenge for astronomers trying to collect data. Often times, getting an adequate signal-to-noise ratio or level of precision in a measurement can take up to tens of thousands of hours. Additionally, a long integration time can smooth out signals that vary with time and result in loss of information, particularly in contexts where a changing signal may be relevant, such as in the detection of exoplanets. For some types of cameras, such as EMCCDs, increasing integration time may not necessarily lead to a higher signal-to-noise ratio.
