= Nikon Nikkor Z 28 mm f/2.8 =

Nikkor Z 28 mm f/2.8
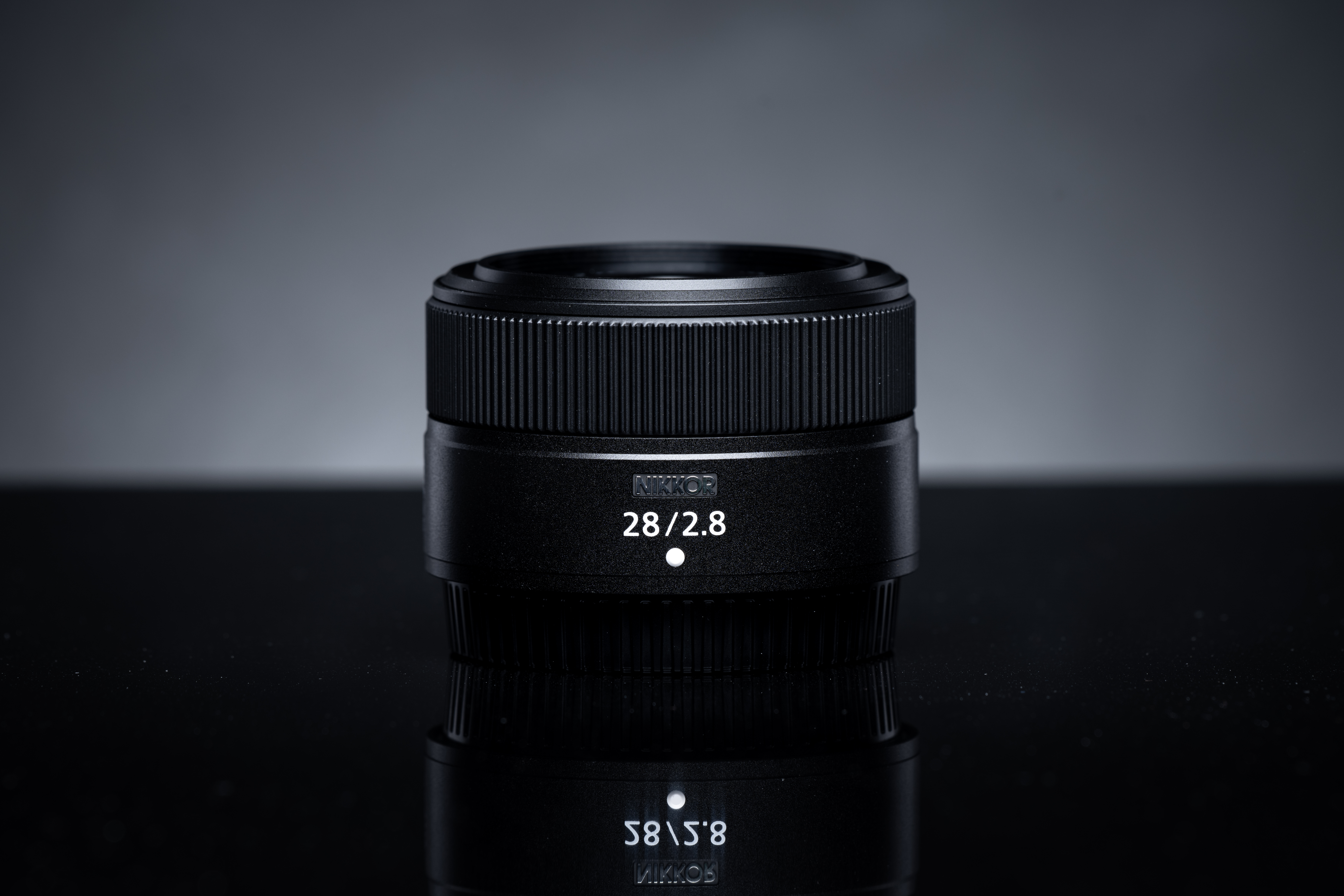
- Maker: Nikon
- Lens mount: Z-mount

Technical data
- Type: Prime
- Focus drive: 2 × stepping motors
- Focal length: 28 mm
- Image format: FX (full frame)
- Aperture (max/min): f/2.8–16
- Close focus distance: 0.19 m
- Max. magnification: 1:5
- Diaphragm blades: 7 (rounded)
- Construction: 9 elements in 8 groups

Features
- Lens-based stabilization: No No
- Macro capable: No No
- Application: Wide-angle Lens

Physical
- Max. length: 43 mm
- Diameter: 70 mm 71.5 mm (SE)
- Weight: 155 g 160 g (SE)
- Filter diameter: 52 mm

Software
- Latest firmware: 1.10 (as of 20 August 2024)
- User flashable: Yes Yes
- Lens ID: 29 (non-SE) unknown (SE)

Angle of view
- Diagonal: 75° (FX); 53° (DX)

History
- Introduction: June 2021 (SE); November 2021 (non-SE)

Retail info
- MSRP: 299.95 USD (as of 2021)

The Nikon Nikkor Z 28 mm f/2.8 is a full-frame, wide-angle prime lens manufactured by Nikon for use on Nikon Z-mount mirrorless cameras.

== Introduction ==
On June 2, 2021, Nikon announced the development of the lens (along with the development of Nikkor Z 40 mm f/2).

First, a Special Edition (SE) version of the lens was released on June 29, 2021. According to Nikon, this SE lens resembles a design from the classic Nikkor lenses released around the same time as the Nikon FM2 film SLR camera. The lens matches the design of the Nikkor Z 40 mm f/2 SE. On November 18, 2021, Nikon released the regularly styled, non-SE version of the lens. Both versions share the same firmware.

The two versions are optically identical, differing only cosmetically (also in weight and maximum diameter of lens dimensions). The lenses do not come with a lens hood.

Philipreeve.net called the lens a solid performer with a very small size and quite reasonable price, an optimal choice for "light and compact travel wide angle lens for landscape or candid street photography". They highlighted very good to excellent sharpness, controlled focus breathing, while for the cons they noted a bigger gap between this lens and the S-line lenses in terms of vignetting, chromatic aberrations and flare resistance. Spencer Cox of Photography Life also concluded that the lens is a solid performer, that is very small and reasonably priced. He praised the excellent autofocus speed and accuracy, smooth bokeh, light weight and small size, while criticizing higher-than-ideal vignetting, distortion and chromatic aberration and lack of controls, buttons on the lens.

== Features ==
- 28 mm focal length (approximately equivalent field of view of a 42 mm lens when used on a DX format camera)
- Autofocus using dual stepping motors (STM), focus-by-wire manual focusing
- 9 elements in 8 groups (including 2 aspherical lens elements)
- 7-blade rounded diaphragm
- Internal focusing (IF lens)
- One customizable control ring (manual focusing by default, aperture, ISO and exposure compensation functions can be assigned to it)
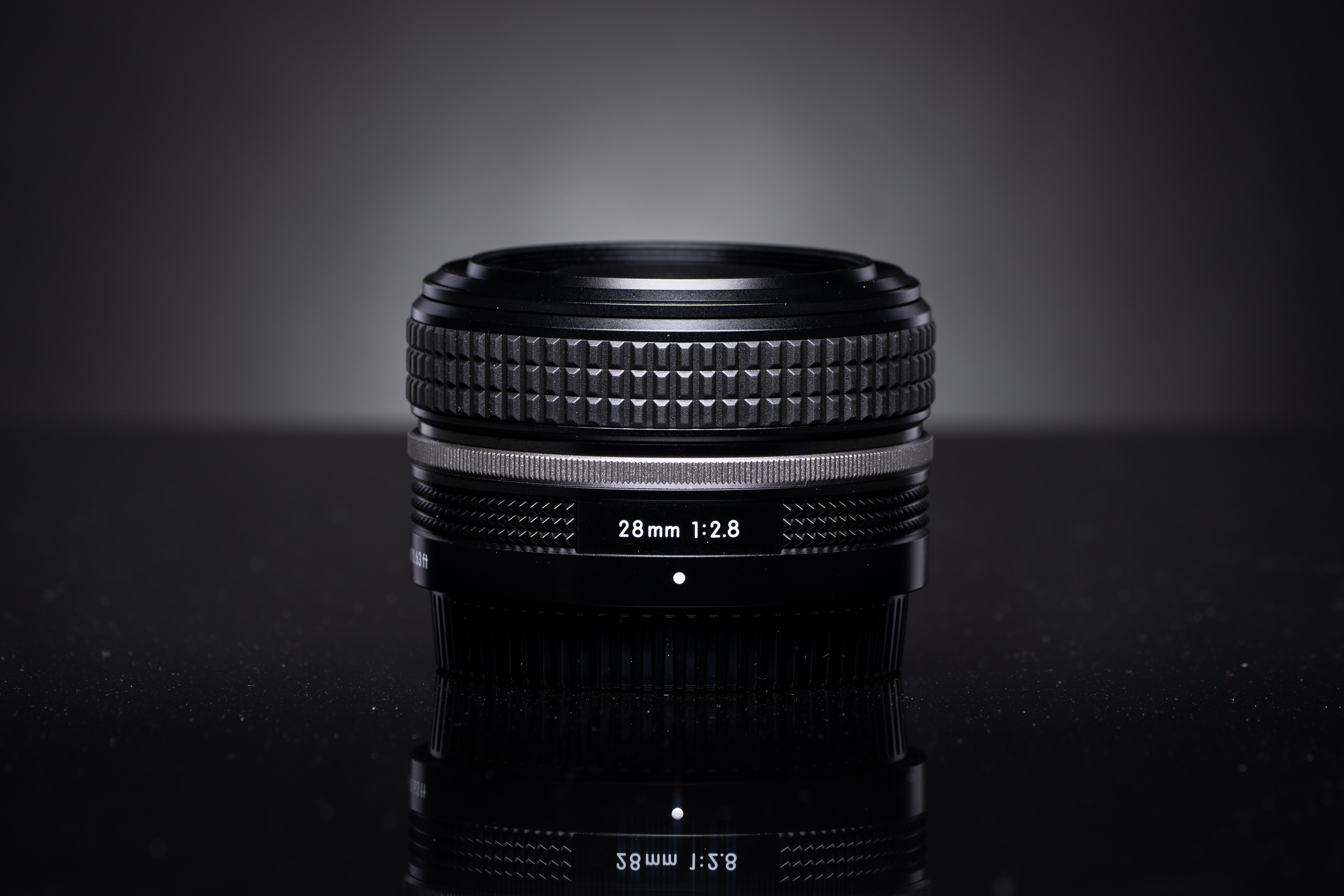
SE version (Special Edition)

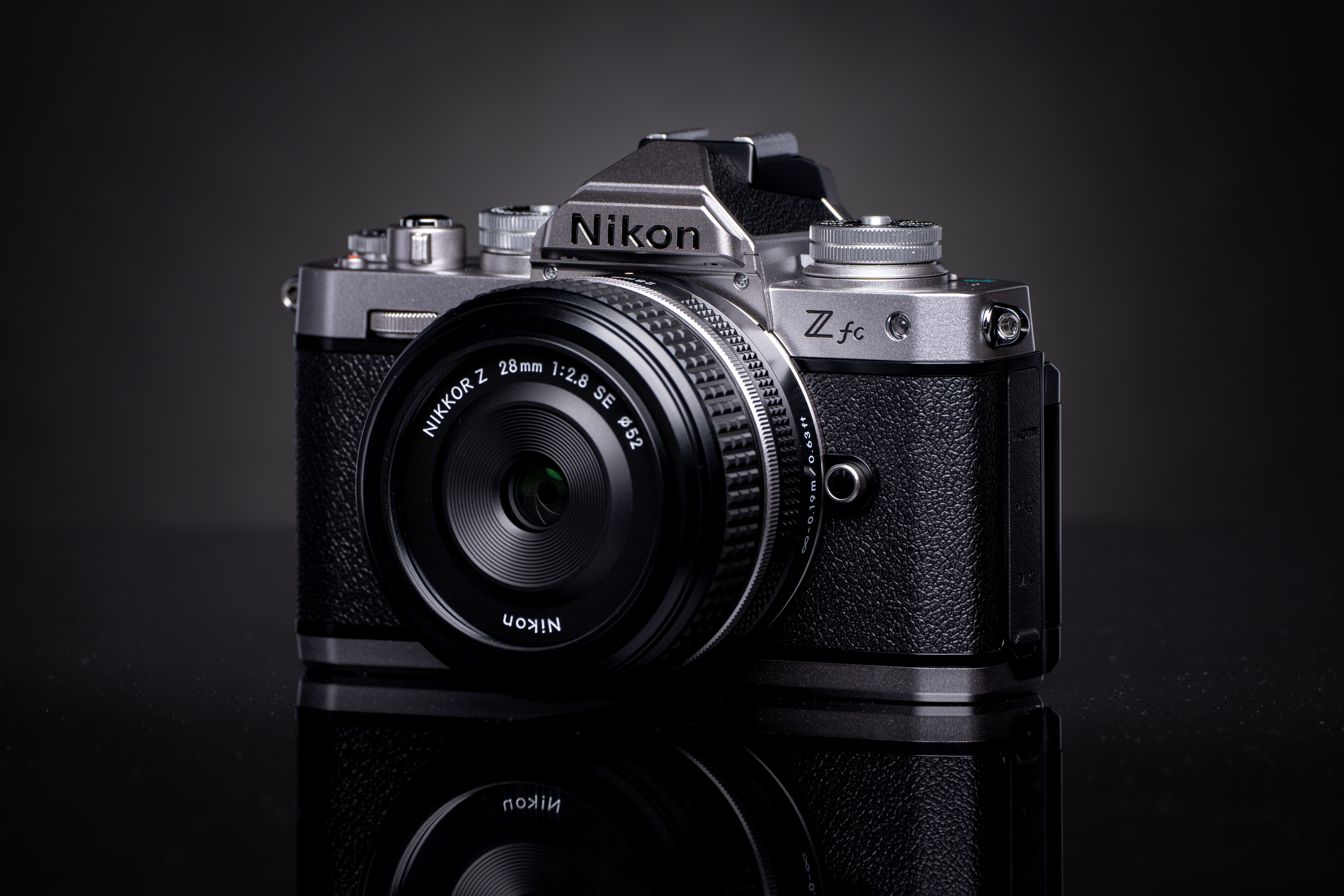
SE version on a Nikon Zfc

== Sample images ==
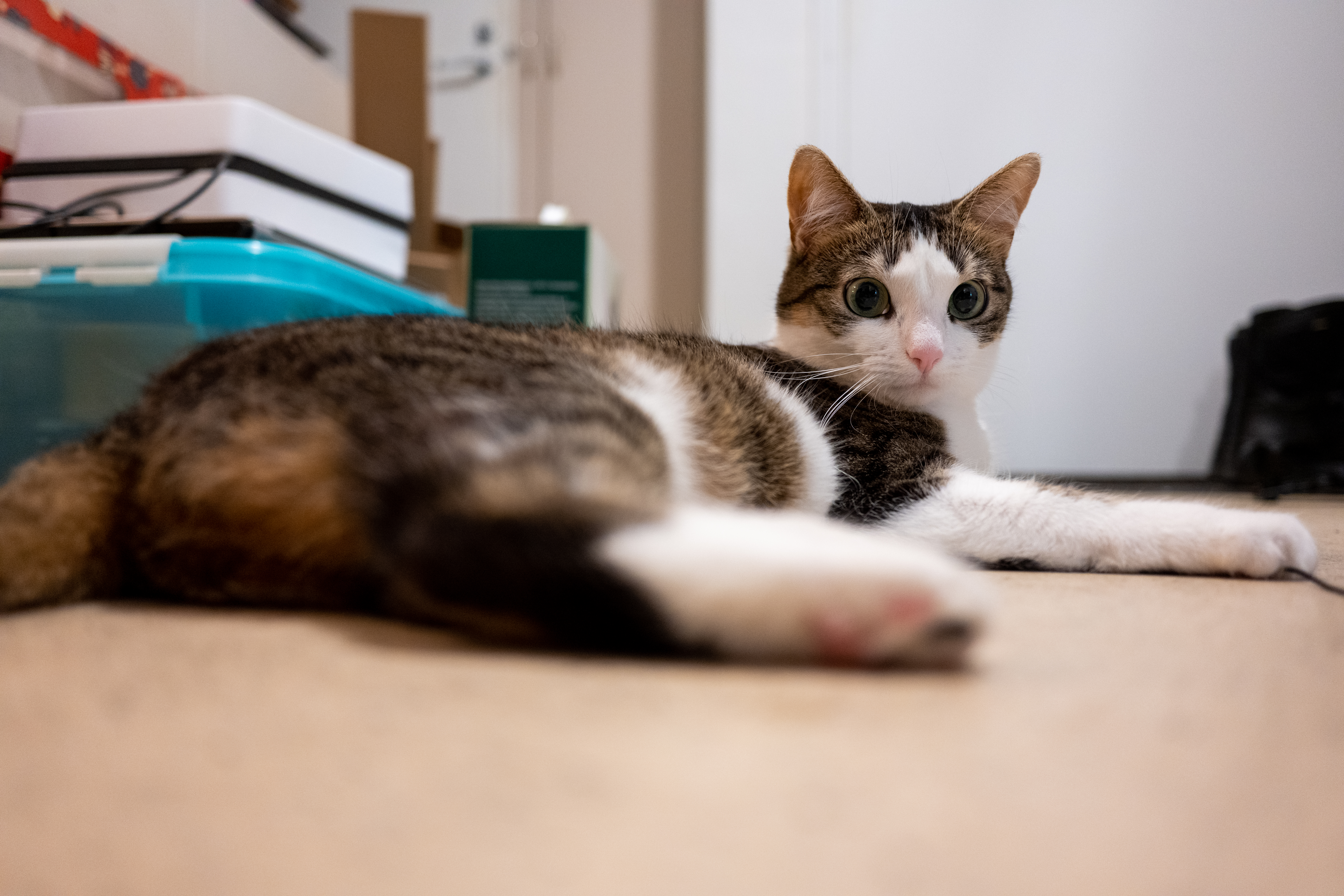
At f/2.8

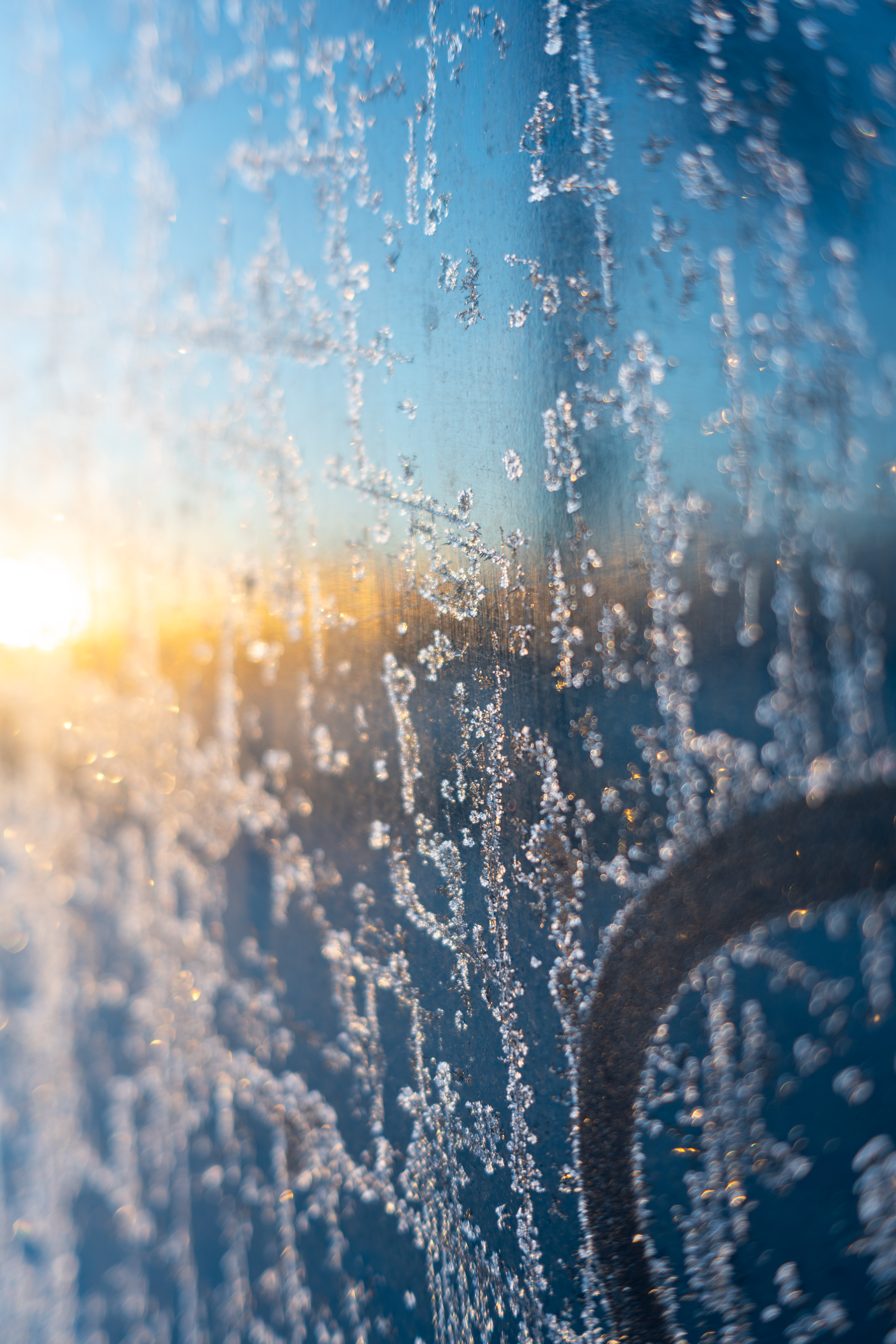
At f/2.8

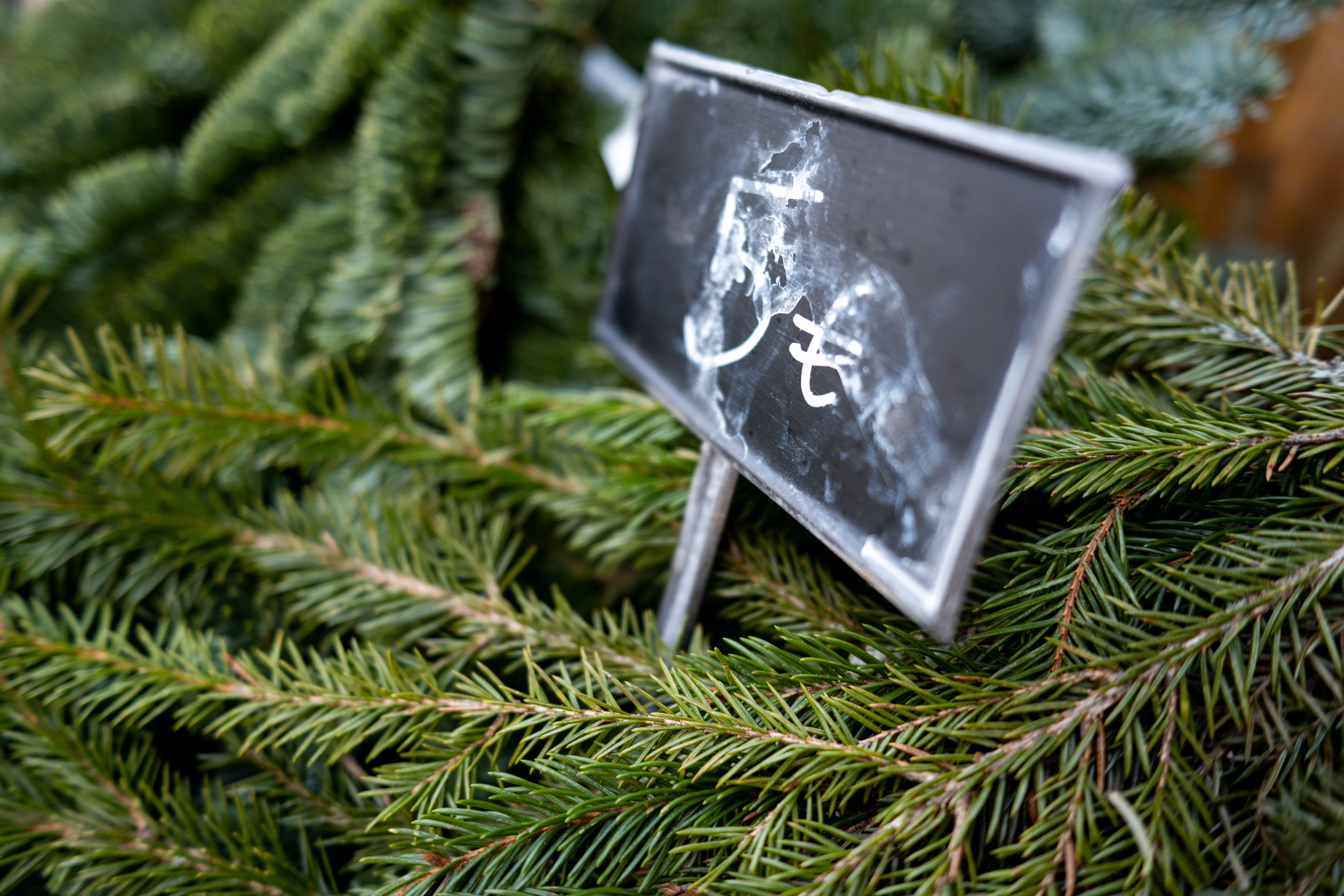
At f/2.8

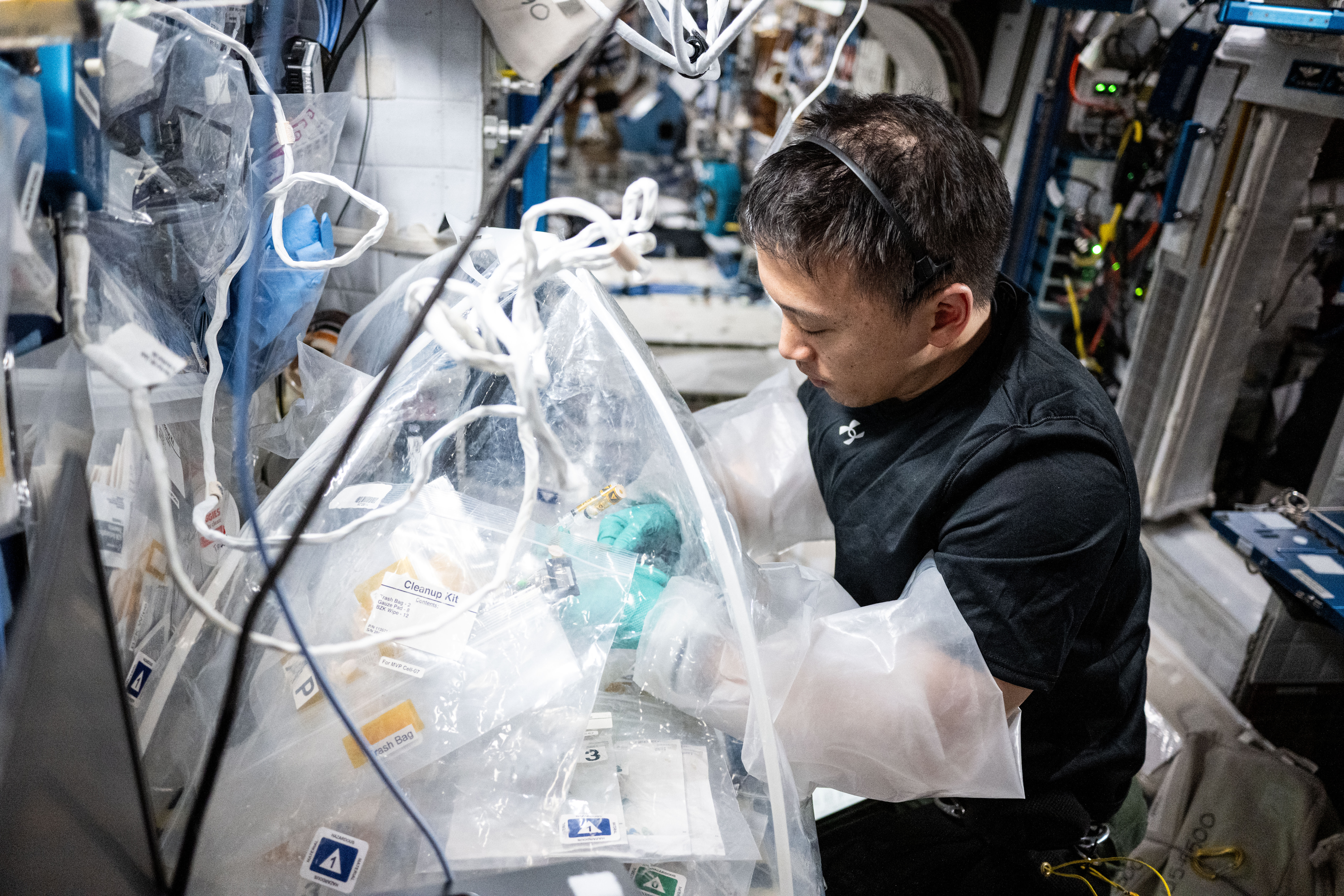
At f/2.8

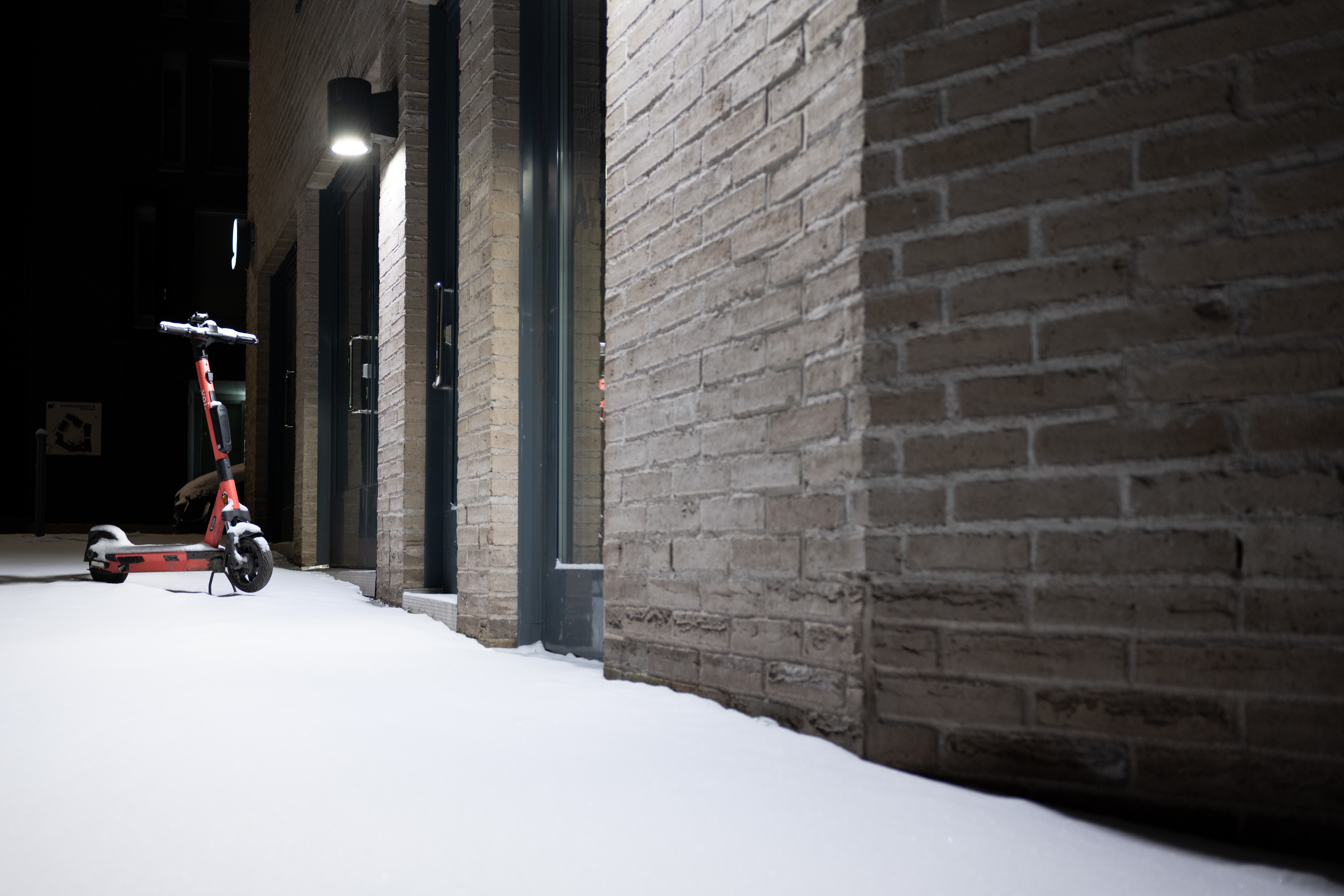
At f/2.8

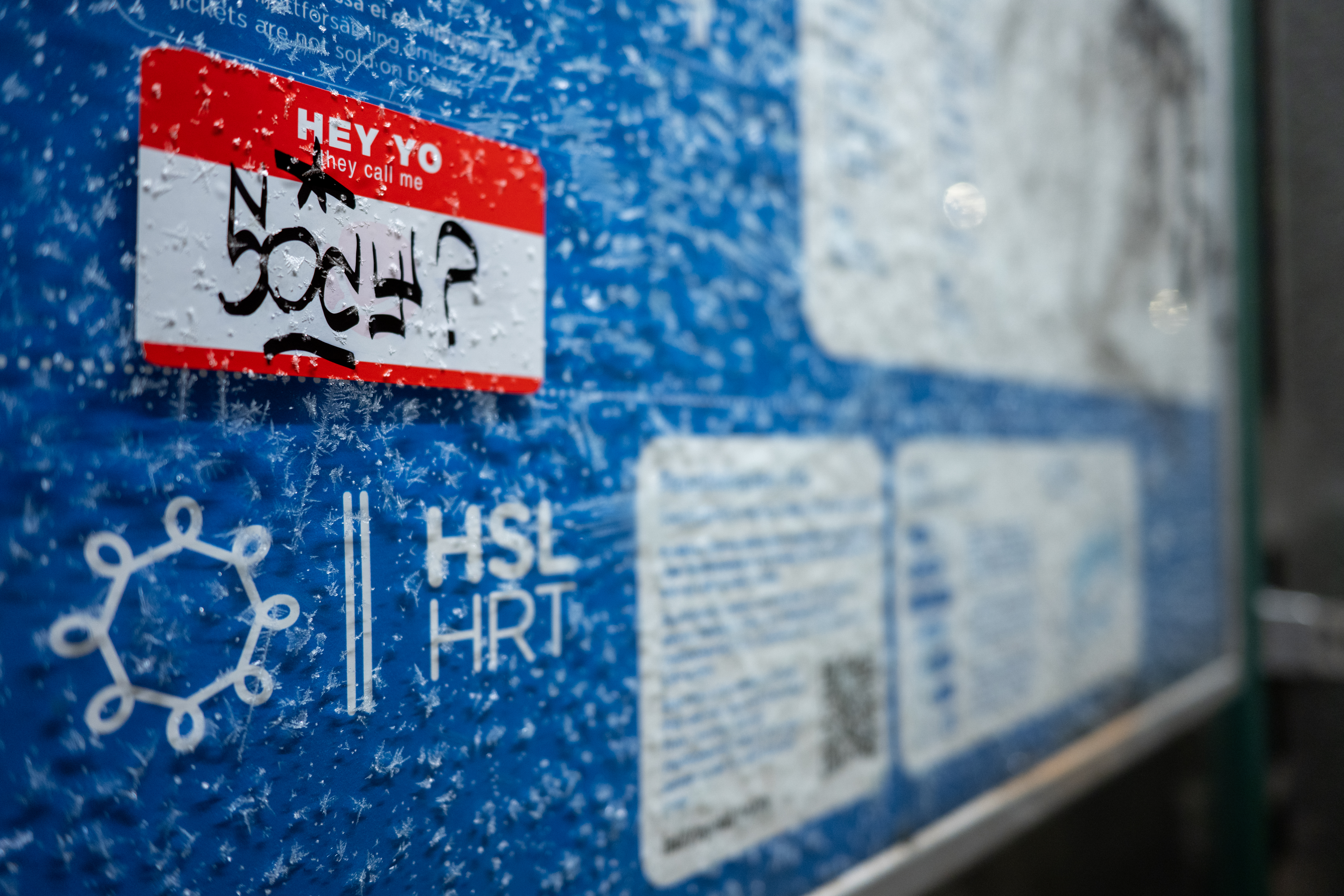
At f/2.8

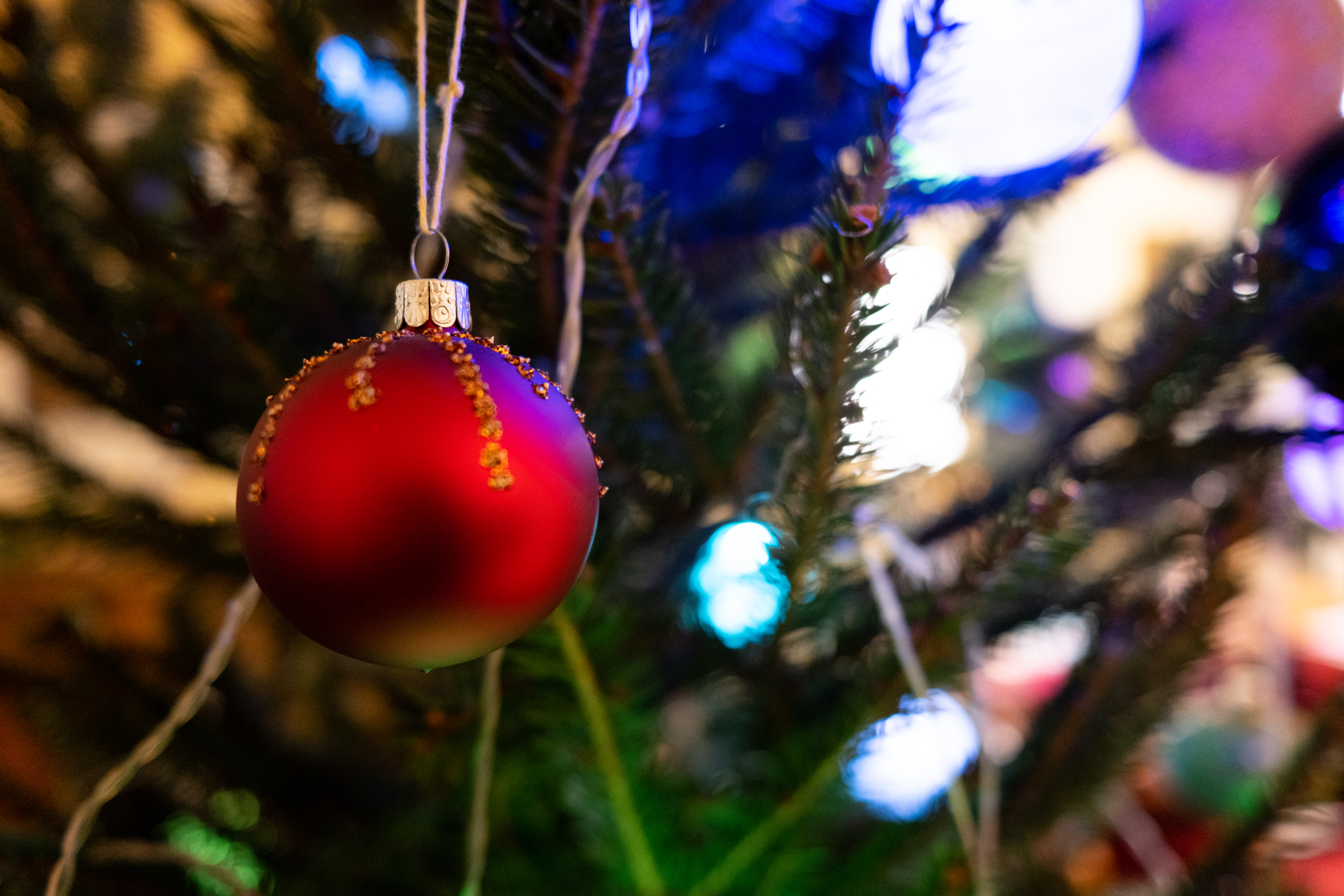
At f/2.8

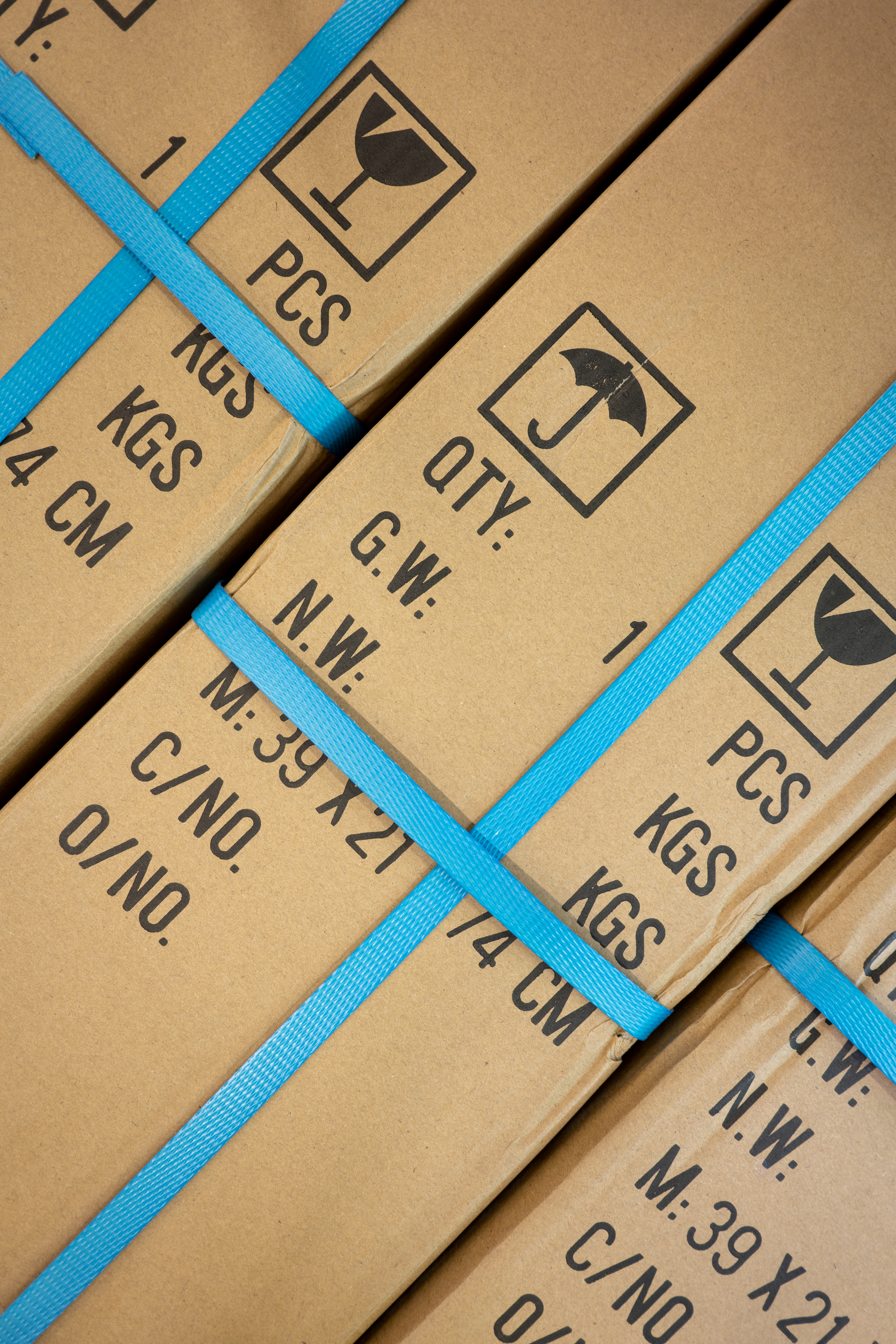
At f/2.8

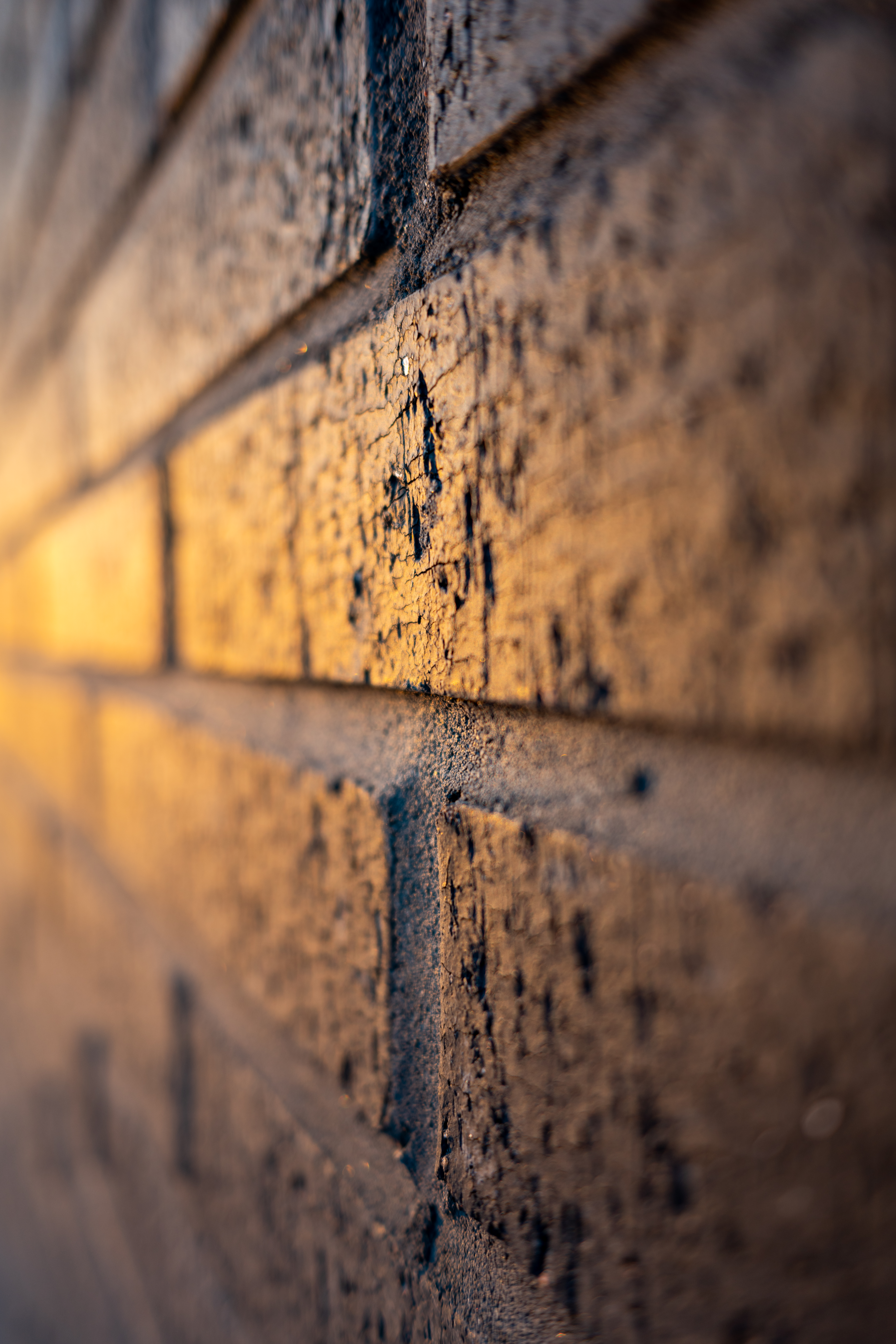
At f/2.8

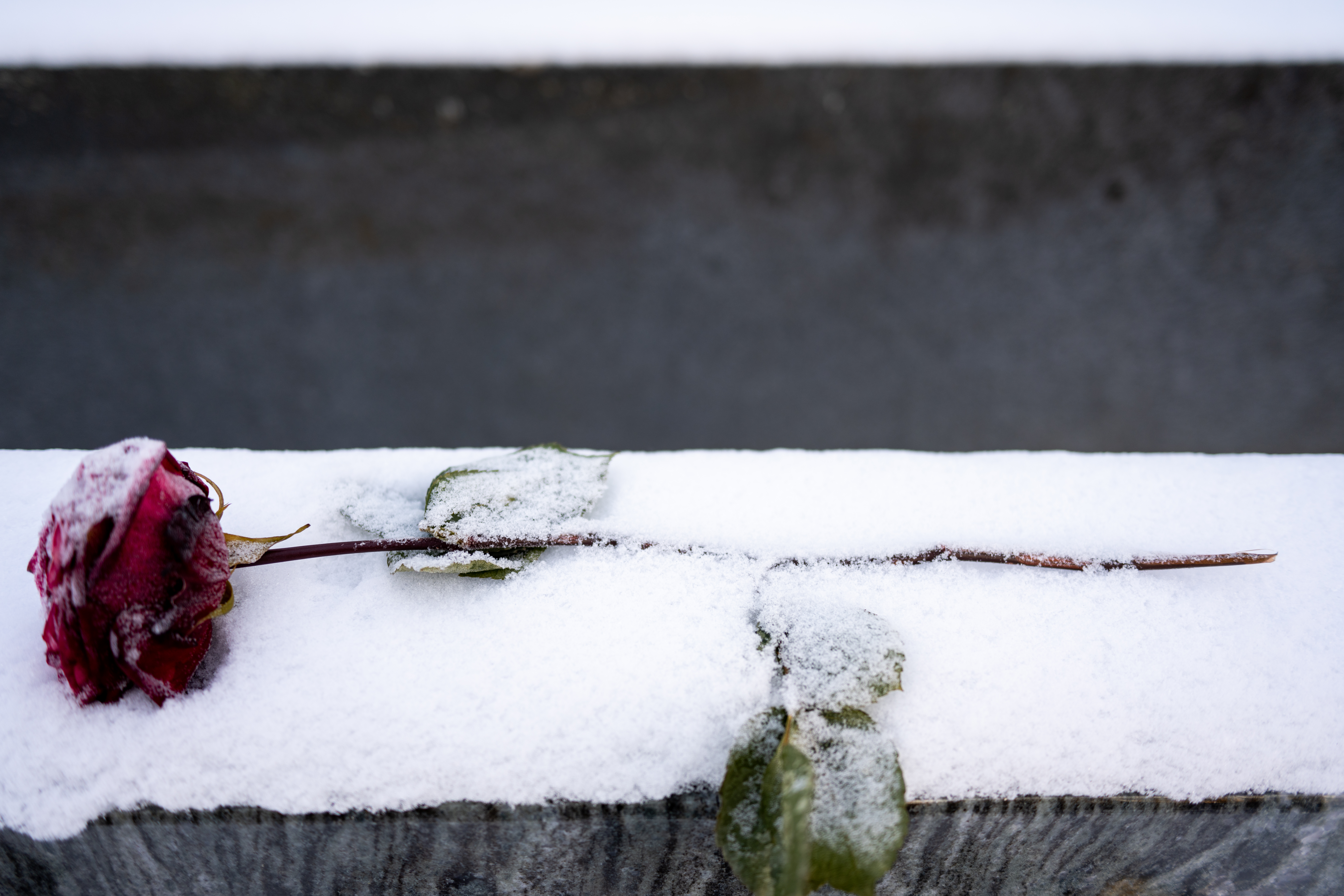
At f/2.8

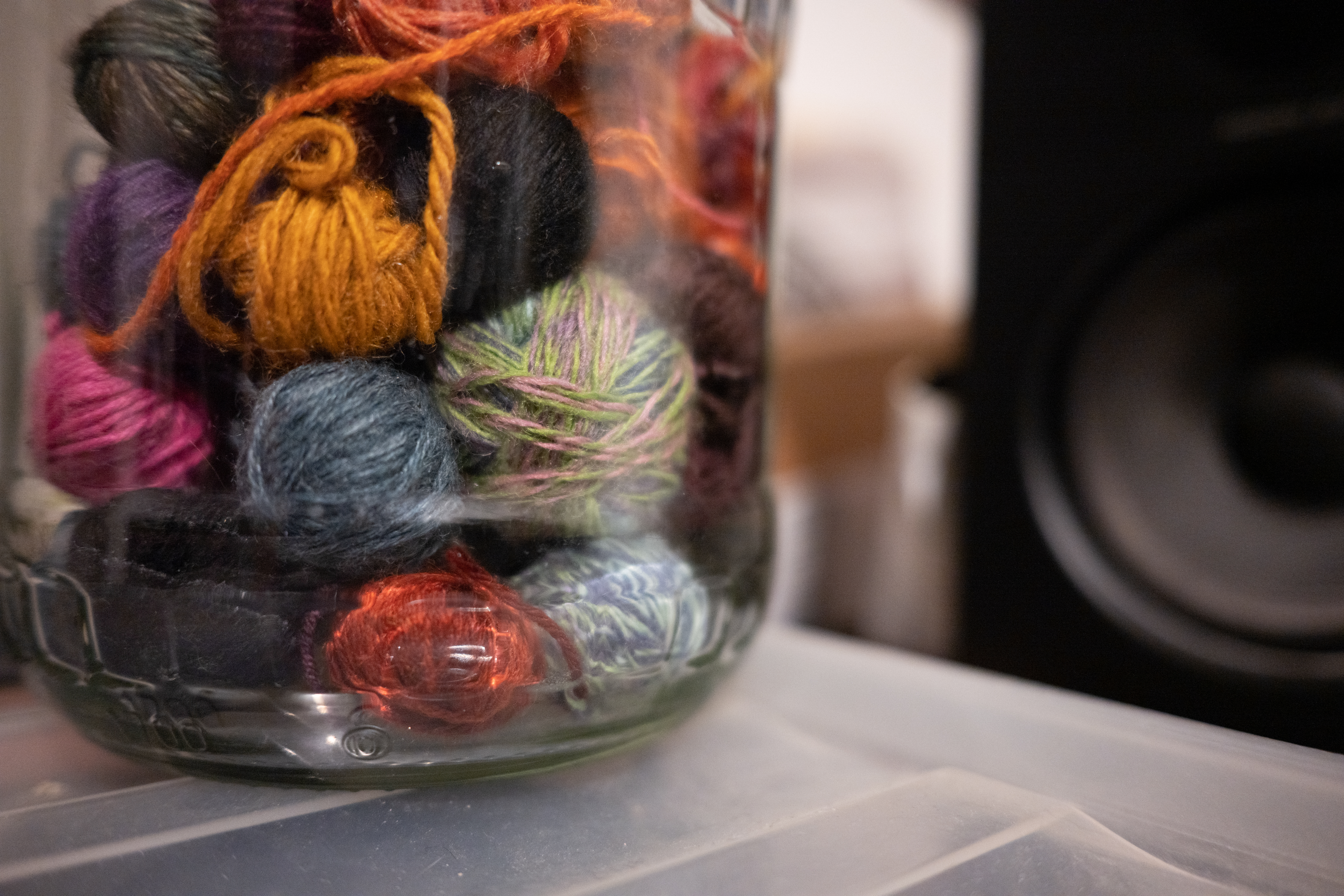
At f/2.8

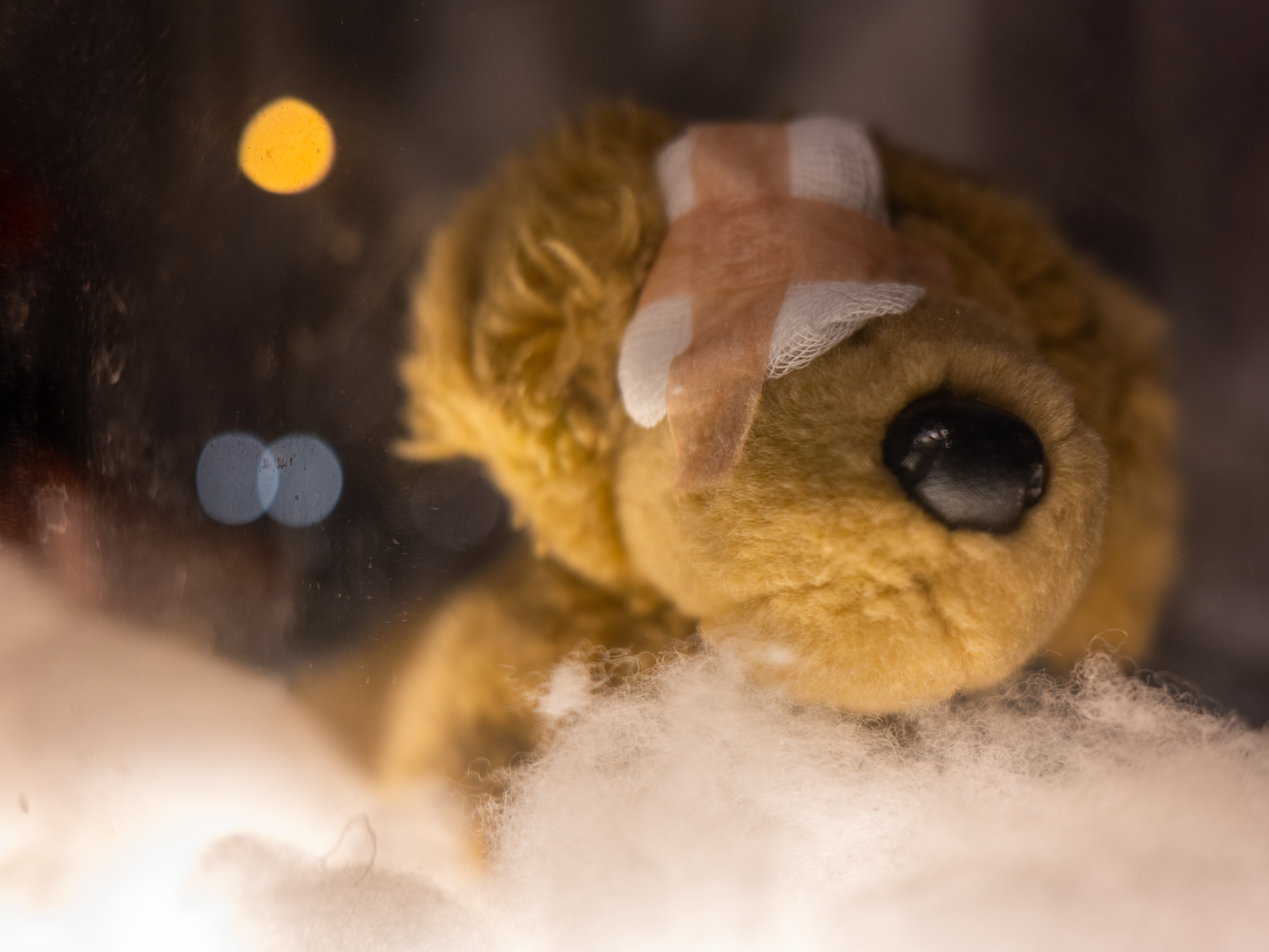
At f/2.8

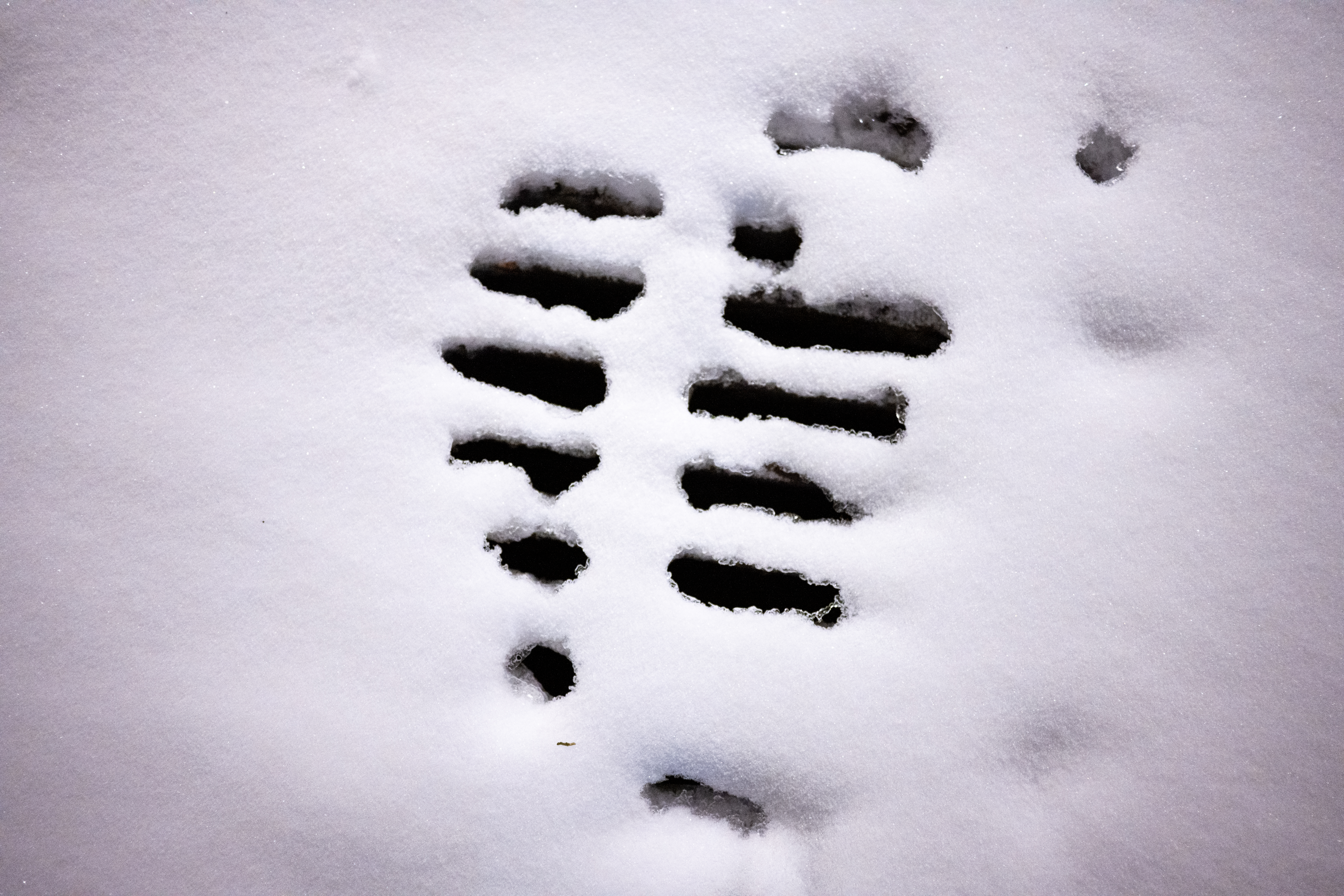
At f/2.8

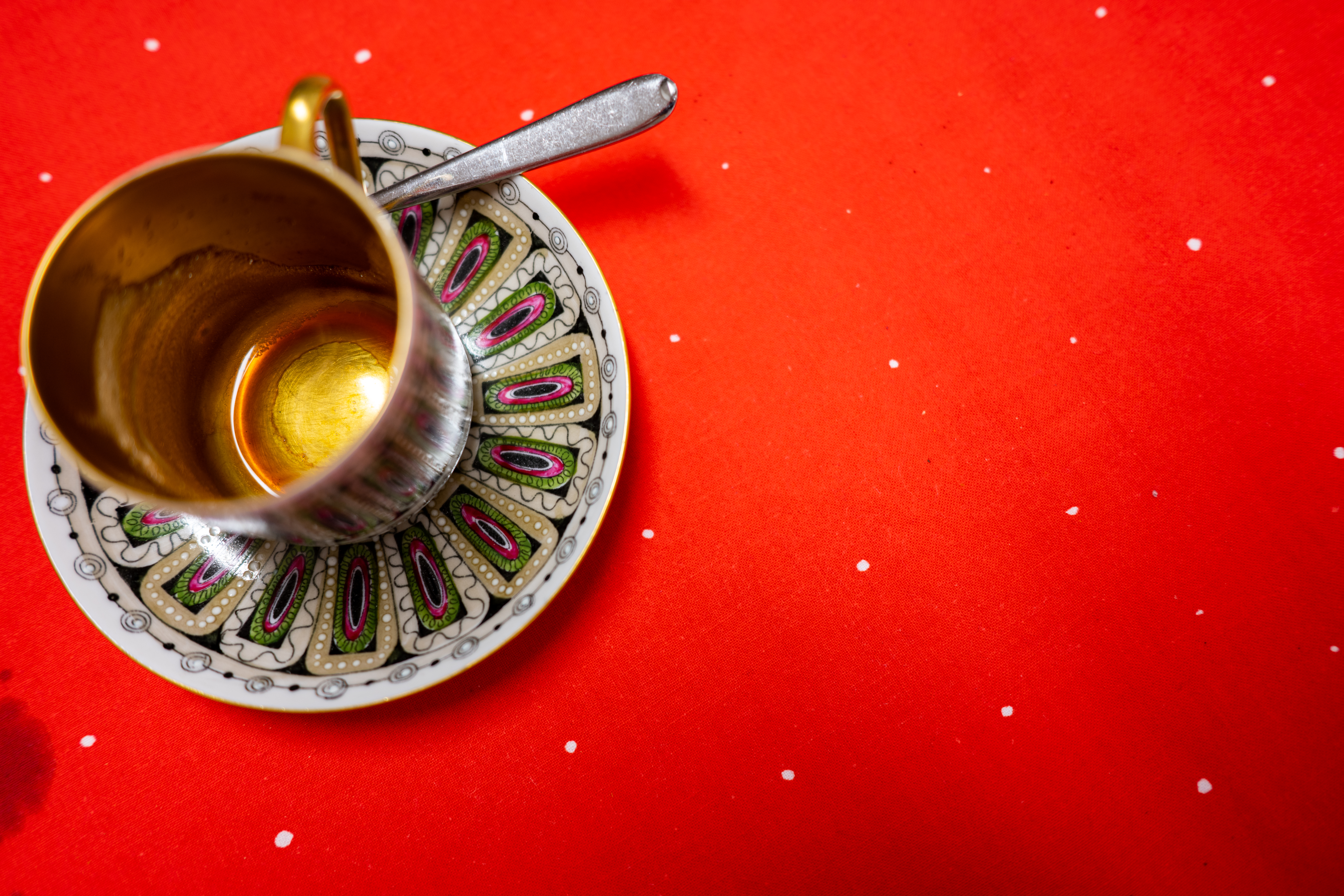
At f/2.8

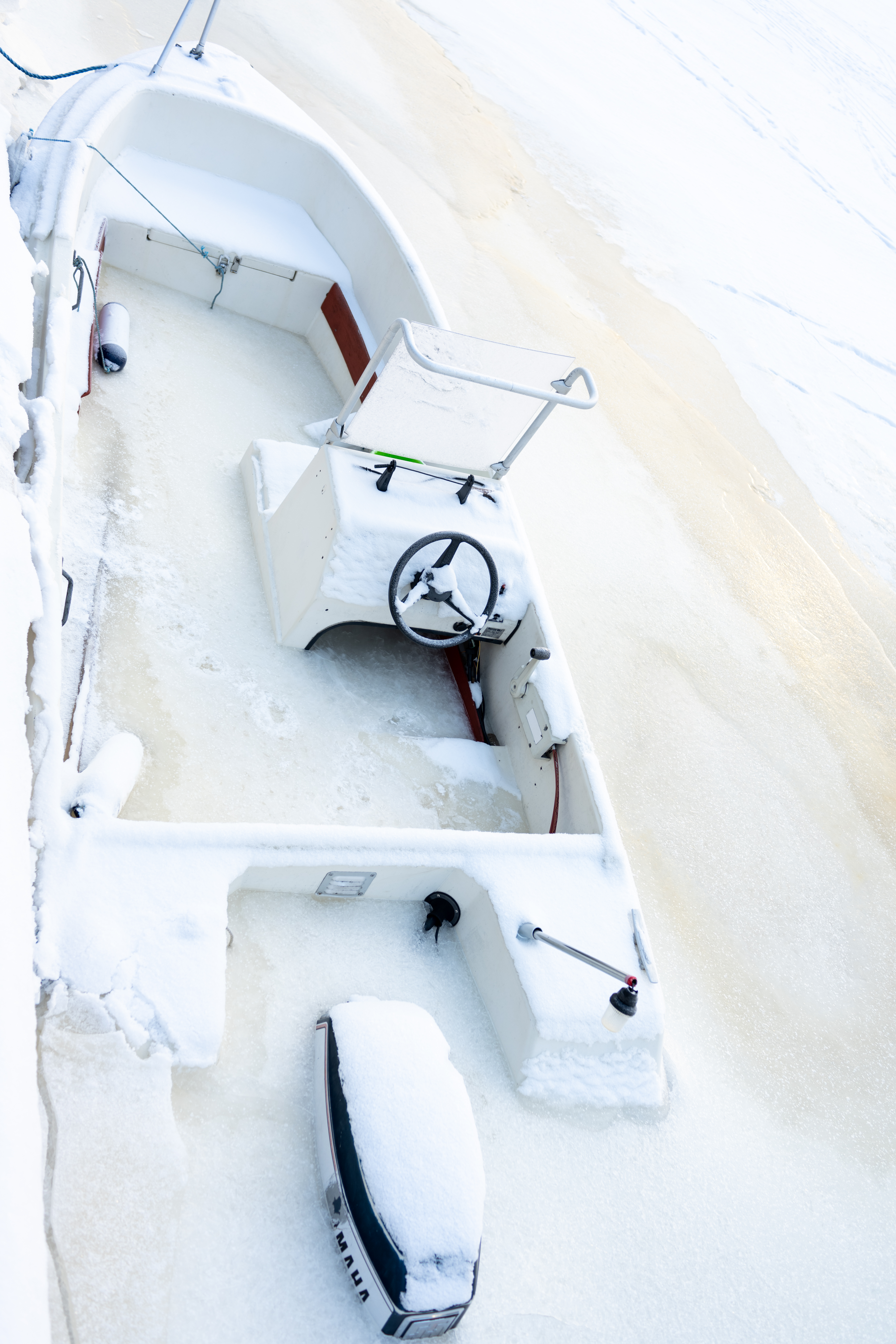
At f/4

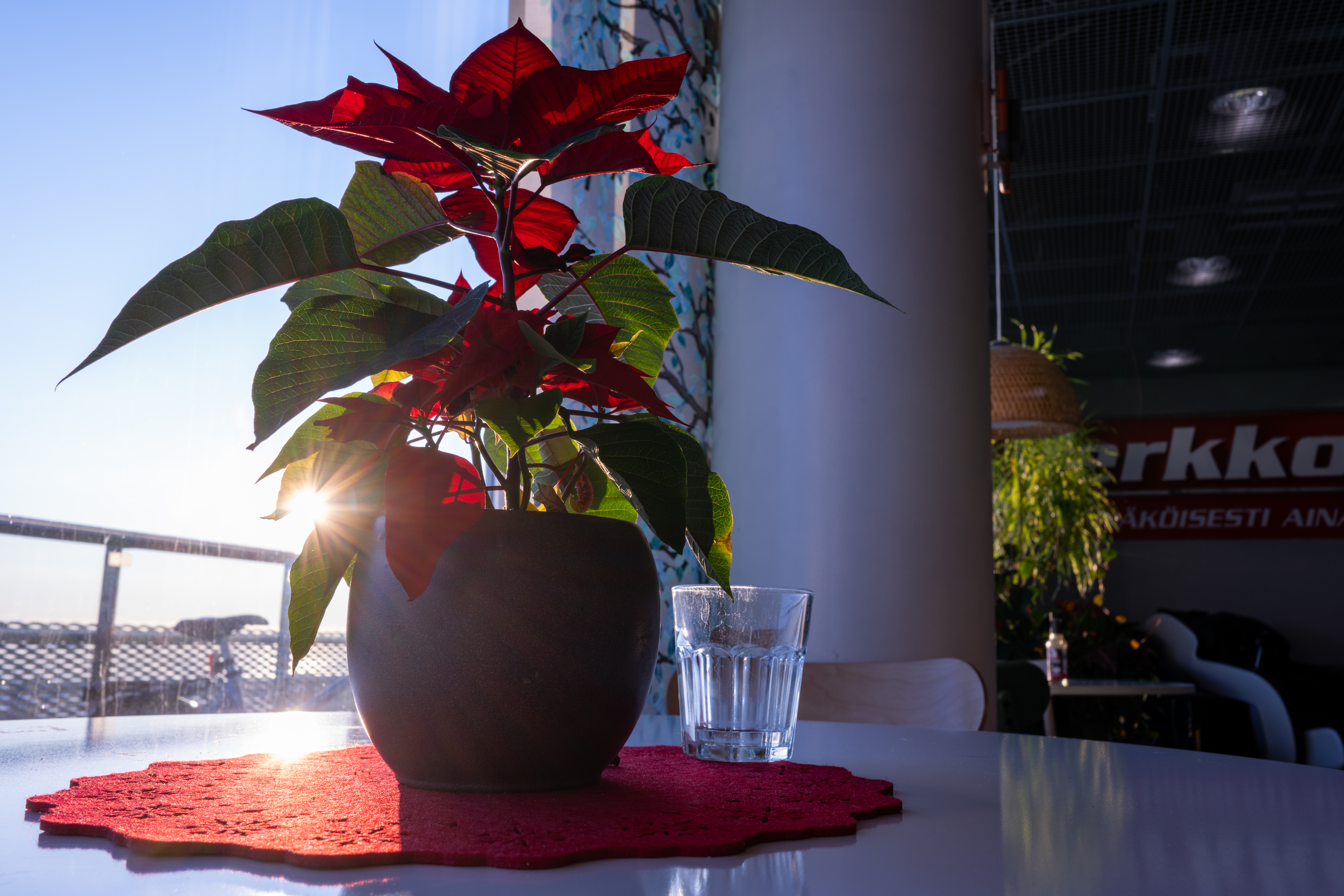
At f/11

== See also ==
- Nikon Z-mount
