= 2014 in France =

- Decades: 1990s; 2000s; 2010s; 2020s; 2030s
- See also: History of France; Timeline of French history; List of years in France

The following is a list of events from the year 2014 in France.

== Incumbents ==
- President – François Hollande (Socialist)
- Prime Minister – Jean-Marc Ayrault (Socialist) (until March 31), Manuel Valls (Socialist) (starting April 1)

== Events ==
=== January ===
- 6 January – Workers at a Goodyear tyre factory in Amiens hold two executives hostage after it was announced that Goodyear was to close the plant with a loss of more than 1,000 jobs. The executives are released the following afternoon.
- 10 January
  - Closer magazine runs a story alleging that François Hollande is having an affair with actress Julie Gayet. In a statement, Hollande says he "deeply deplores the attacks on the principle of respect for privacy, to which he, like every citizen, has a right". The story is later removed from the magazine's website.
  - François Hollande's partner, Valérie Trierweiler, is admitted to hospital for "rest and a few tests" following the affair allegations. She remains hospitalised until 18 January.
- 16 January – A protester calling for a political upheaval unloads a large mound of manure outside the Palais Bourbon from a lorry before being detained by police.
- 19 January – High levels of rainfall cause flooding in Var, killing two people and leaving 4,000 homes without power.
- 25 January – François Hollande confirms he has separated from his partner Valérie Trierweiler.

=== February ===
- 2 February – Over 500,000 people in Paris protest against same-sex marriages.
- 7 February – A severe windstorm hits the north-west of France, causing floods in Brittany and power losses to homes and businesses in Brittany, Pays de la Loire, Normandy and Île-de-France.
- 8 February – A train derails in the French Alps after being struck by a falling boulder, killing two and injuring nine.
- 10 February – Taxi drivers stage a one-day strike against the proliferation of unlicensed and unregulated cabs in the country. Their efforts in blocking motorways paralyses rush hour traffic in Paris and Marseille.
- 12 February – French President François Hollande is hosted by US President Barack Obama at a White House state dinner, during a visit by Hollande to the US aimed at renewing the partnership between the two countries.
- 14 February
  - France announces it will increase the number of its soldiers deployed in the Central African Republic as sectarian violence worsens.
  - Figures released by INSEE show the economy grew by 0.0% and 0.3% in the third and fourth quarters of 2013 respectively.
- 18 February – French police arrest a man in relation to a killing of a British family in the French Alps.
- 23 February – Six police officers are injured when protests against the construction of a new airport in Nantes turns violent.

=== March ===
- 6 March – Le Monde runs a story claiming that the phone of former President Nicolas Sarkozy had been tapped by judges investigating alleged financial links between him and the former Libyan dictator Muammar Gaddafi. It is also alleged that the taps contain evidence of Sarkozy attempting to interfere with judicial inquiries.
- 11 March – Fourteen Caribbean nations file a lawsuit against the United Kingdom, France, and the Netherlands for damages caused during the Atlantic slave trade.
- 14 March – Several days of calm weather conditions cause a large buildup of airborne pollutants across much of France, leading to health alert warnings being declared in almost 75% of the country. In a bid to cut further air pollution, transport authorities in Paris, Caen, Grenoble, Reims and Rouen respond by offering free public transport over the weekend.
- 17 March – With air pollution exceeding safe levels for five consecutive days, authorities in Paris begin restricting the private use of cars and motorcycles to alternate days only. The measure polarises opinion and thousands of fines are handed out to drivers breaking the restriction before it is lifted the following day.
- 23 March – The first round of the 2014 municipal elections takes place, with support for the governing Socialist Party declining and support for the right-wing National Front increasing. A BVA poll reports UMP leading with 48% of the vote, ahead of the Socialists on 43% and National Front on 7%.
- 26 March – Figures released by the Ministry of Labour show a 0.9% rise in unemployment in February. The total jobless count in mainland France now stands at 3.347 million.
- 30 March – The second round of the municipal elections takes place:
  - Substantial gains are made by the parties of the right, with UMP taking control in at least 140 towns and National Front winning power in 11 towns, while the Socialists suffer heavy losses, most prominently at Limoges which they had held since 1912. The election is marked by a low turnout, with 38% of voters abstaining from voting.
  - Anne Hidalgo of the Socialist Party is elected Mayor of Paris, becoming the first woman to hold the position.
  - One week after winning more than 75% of the vote in the first round, the mayor-elect of the southwestern town of Vibrac, Philipe Sauty, commits suicide before taking office.
- 31 March – Jean-Marc Ayrault resigns as Prime Minister following the disappointing municipal election results for the Socialists. The Interior Minister Manuel Valls is announced as his replacement.

=== April ===
- 7 April – A magnitude 5 earthquake is felt in parts of southeastern France, close to the Italian border. No injuries or damage is reported.
- 12 April – An estimated 25,000 people on the far-left turn out to protest in Paris against the austerity measures imposed by the Hollande government. A recent poll places Hollande's popularity at its lowest to date, with just 18% approving of his role as president.
- 14 April – Following the rape of a 16-year-old girl at a private Catholic school in La Rochelle the previous September, police begin a mass DNA test of the school's 527 male pupils and staff to attempt to identify the perpetrator.
- 24 April – Shares in engineering company Alstom climb 11% following a report of a $13bn takeover bid by American company General Electric. The following week Alstom's board of directors approve of a $12.4bn offer, despite the government's successful attempt at persuading Siemens to offer a counter-bid.
- 25 April – The Corsican Assembly passes a law restricting the purchase of homes to only those who have maintained residence on the island for a minimum of five years.

=== May ===
- 5 May – The Senate approves a ban on the cultivation of MON810, a type of genetically modified corn developed by American agribusiness firm Monsanto.
- 6 May – The $12.4bn takeover bid of Alstom by General Electric is rejected by François Hollande, citing "national interest" grounds.
- 7 May – Paris St. Germain secure the Ligue 1 title for the second consecutive season.
- 13 May – The International Organisation of Vine and Wine announces that the United States has overtaken France as the world's largest consumer of wine. France however remains the leader on consumption per capita.
- 17 May – Leaders of West African nations gather in Paris for discussions on the threat posed by the Nigerian militant group Boko Haram. The summit follows the Chibok schoolgirl kidnapping orchestrated by Boko Haram in northern Nigeria the previous month.
- 21 May – A new specification of train designed by SNCF is revealed to be too wide for some 1,300 stations across France. Modifying the affected station platforms is estimated to cost €40 million.
- 24–25 May – The European Parliament elections take place, with National Front winning 25% of the votes, taking 24 of France's 74 seats, the UMP polling second with 20%, landing 19 seats, and the Socialists third on 14%, securing 13 seats. Front National party president Marine Le Pen declares the result a "massive rejection of the European Union", with Prime Minister Manuel Valls calling it "more than another warning; it's a shock, an earthquake".

=== June ===
- 2 June – Plans are announced to reduce the number of regions in Metropolitan France from 22 to 14 in an effort to cut regional bureaucracy and spending.
- 6 June – Ceremonies commemorating the 70th anniversary of the D-Day landings are held in Normandy.

=== July ===
- 17 July – A train collides into another train near Denguin, Pyrénées-Atlantiques, injuring 40 people.
- 24 July – 54 French citizens are killed after Air Algérie Flight 5017 crashes in Mali en route from Ouagadougou, Burkina Faso to Algiers, Algeria, with a total of 118 fatalities. Flags are flown at half-mast in France for three days of official mourning.

=== August ===
- 4 August – Three members of the Thomas family are murdered in Grande-Synthe.

=== November ===
- 25 November – Rémy Cordonnier, librarian at Saint-Omer, announces his discovery of a previously unknown copy of a First Folio of Shakespeare (1623).

=== December ===
- 20 December – 2014 Tours police station stabbing: Bertrand Nzohabonayo, a Burundi-born French citizen attacks and injures three police officers at Joué-lès-Tours before being shot and killed.

=== General ===
- Christophe Guilluy publishes La France périphérique: Comment on a sacrifié les classes populaires.
- The penetration rate of the mobile phone in French Republic is around 107–109%.
- Welcome Real Time software publisher is acquired by Collinson Group.

== Deaths ==
- 6 January – Marina Ginestà, 94, French-born Spanish veteran of the Spanish Civil War (b. 1919)
- 29 January – François Cavanna, 90, author and newspaper editor (b. 1923)
- 1 March – Alain Resnais, 91, film director (Hiroshima mon amour, Last Year at Marienbad) (b. 1922)
- 12 March – René Llense, 100, footballer (b. 1913)
- 1 April – Jacques Le Goff, 90, historian (b. 1924)
- 7 June – Jacques Herlin, 86, actor (b. 1927)
- 15 June – Jacques Bergerac, 87, actor and businessman (b. 1927)
- 23 June – Marie Jacq, 94, politician (b. 1919)
- 13 July – Lorin Maazel, 84, French-American conductor and violinist (b. 1930)
- 3 August – Yvette Giraud, 97, singer and actress (b. 1916)
- 26 October – Françoise Bertin, 89, actress (b. 1925)

== See also ==
- 2014 in French television
- List of French films of 2014
