= 2011 in France =

- Decades: 1990s; 2000s; 2010s; 2020s; 2030s
- See also: History of France; Timeline of French history; List of years in France

The events from the year 2011 in France are mentioned below:

== Incumbents ==
- President: Nicolas Sarkozy
- Prime Minister: François Fillon

== Events ==
=== January ===
- 30 January – France win the 2011 World Men's Handball Championship after defeating Denmark.

=== March ===
- 20 March and 27 March – 2011 French cantonal elections

=== June ===
- June – International Institute of Nuclear Energy is officially inaugurated.
- 4 June – Murder of Alexandre Junca

=== November ===
- 6 November – 7 November – about 7,500 homes in the departments of Var and Alpes-Maritimes lost internet or phone service due to floods in Europe.
- 29 November – France including its overseas territories switched off all of its analogue signals at the same time.

=== General ===
The penetration rate of the mobile phone in French Republic is from around 96-97% to 100-101%.

== Births ==
- 19 October – Giulia Sarkozy, daughter of Nicolas Sarkozy and Carla Bruni

== Deaths ==
- 17 January – Jean Dutourd, novelist (born 1920)
- 3 February
  - Maria Schneider, actress (born 1952)
  - Édouard Glissant, writer, poet and literary critic (born 1928)
- 6 February – Andrée Chedid, Egyptian-born poet and novelist (born 1920)
- 15 February – François Nourissier, journalist and writer (born 1927)
- 23 February – Jean Lartéguy, writer, journalist, and former soldier (born 1920)
- 28 February – Annie Girardot, actress (born 1931)
- 25 March – Jean Royer, politician, former Minister, and former Mayor of Tours (born 1920)
- 24 April – Marie-France Pisier, Indochinese-born actress (born 1944)
- 13 September – DJ Mehdi, hip hop and house producer (born 1977)
- 15 September – Georges Fillioud, politician (born 1929)
- 16 September – Jean Leclant, archaeologist and Egyptologist (born 1920)
- 17 September – Roger Agache, archaeologist (born 1926)
- 19 September – Bernard Collomb, racing driver (born 1930)
- 21 September – Paulette Dubost, actress (born 1910)
- 22 September – Danielle Mitterrand, activist and widow of François Mitterrand (born 1924)
- 27 September – Cizia Zykë, writer and adventurer (born 1949)
- 25 December – Christophe Laigneau, footballer (Stade Lavallois) (born 1965)
