= 2009 in France =

- Decades: 1980s; 1990s; 2000s; 2010s; 2020s
- See also: History of France; Timeline of French history; List of years in France

This article lists events from the year 2009 in France.

== Incumbents ==
- President – Nicolas Sarkozy
- Prime Minister – François Fillon

== Events ==
=== January ===
- 24 January – Klaus (storm) hit south-western France -Aquitaine, Poitou-Charentes, Midi-Pyrénées- and northern Spain, with wind speeds in excess of 193 kilometres per hour (120 mph). 12 people have died because of this storm in the country (28 in Europe).
- 29 January – Strike action by French public sector workers causes major disruption to services.

=== February ===
- General strikes in Guadeloupe and Martinique.
- At the beginning of February: A conflict ignites the French universities concerning the statute of the searchers-teachers. Many voices claim moreover the abrogation of law LRU on the autonomy of the universities. The second half of the universities' year is very disrupted.

=== March ===
- 20 March : Child abduction of 3-year-old Franco-Russian girl Elise, by her Russian mother in Arles (Bouches du Rhône).
- 29 March : Referendum on the departmentalization of island of Mayotte. The result is "Yes" with a crushing majority. Mayotte island will become the 101st French department.

=== April ===
- April : Do Not Look at the Sun literary magazine is launched.
- 3 and 4 April : Summit of NATO in Strasbourg. France joined the integrated command of NATO, a decision which is far from making unanimity in the French political community. During the summit, large incidents occur in certain districts of Strasbourg.
- 15 April : Coming into effect of the new plates of registrations on the new vehicles. New classification is allotted to life for each vehicle and comprises two letters, an indent, three digits, an indent and two letters. A number of department to the choice as well as the logo of the corresponding area is affixed on the line.

=== May ===
- 1 May : France's health minister confirms the first cases of swine flu detected within the country.

=== June ===
- 1 June : Air France Flight 447, a scheduled flight from Rio de Janeiro to Paris, crashes into the Atlantic Ocean, killing all 228 people on board.
- 9 June : European Election.

=== July ===
- 9 July : Youths protest in Firminy near Saint-Étienne, after an Algerian man, Mohamed Benmouna, dies in police custody. His parents reject the official verdict of suicide.
- 14 July : Bastille Day riots take place in a suburb of Paris. In the commune of Montreuil, Seine-Saint-Denis, an eastern suburb area of Paris, youths set fire to 317 cars, and thirteen police officers are injured.
- 26 July : The 2009 Tour de France concludes in Paris. Alberto Contador of Spain is the overall winner.

=== August ===
- 6 August: Marina Sabatier, an 8-year-old girl, was abused to death by her parents.

=== September ===
- 27 September – The 2009 Jeux de la Francophonie open in Beirut, Lebanon.

=== October ===
- 27 October – The 2009 French Super Series badminton competition opens in Paris.

=== November ===
- 9 November – Socialist politician Jack Lang, appointed by President Nicolas Sarkozy as special envoy to North Korea, travels to Pyongyang for a "listening mission".

20 November – Air France makes its first commercial flight of the Airbus A380

== Births ==
- 6 April - Valentina Tronel, singer and winner of the Junior Eurovision Song Contest 2020
- 7 March – Prince Umberto of Savoy
- 19 November – Prince Gaston of Orléans (2009–)

== Deaths ==
=== January ===
- 1 : Laurence Pernoud, writer
- 6 : Jean-Pierre Bakrim, soccer player
- 7 : Roger Besse, politician
- 8 : Gaston Lenôtre, pastry chef
- 10 : Georges Cravenne, producer, "César Award" creator
- 12 : Claude Berri, producer and filmmaker
- 14 : Nicolas Genka, writer
- 15 : René Coll, orchestra driver
- 22 : Marcel Schneider, writer
- 25 : Gérard Blanc, singer

=== February ===
- 26 : Paul Germain, scientist

=== March ===
- 2 : Alexandre Léontieff, French Polynesia president until 1991
- 14 : Alain Bashung, singer
- 29 : Maurice Jarre, composer

=== April ===
- 14 : Maurice Druon, writer

=== May ===
- 20 : Lucy Gordon, British actress

=== June ===
- 6 : Jean Dausset, immunologist
- 32: Saïd Bouziri, human rights and immigrant rights activist

=== July ===
- 6 : Mathieu Montcourt, tennis player

=== August ===
- 22 : Adrien Zeller, politician

=== September ===
- 6 : Sim, actor, comedian, writer
- 12 : Willy Ronis, photographer

=== October ===
- 14 : Francis Muguet, scientist

=== November ===
- 17 : José Aboulker, member of anti-Nazi resistance
- 19 : Daul Kim, South Korean model
