= Tiefencastel derailment =

Train crash

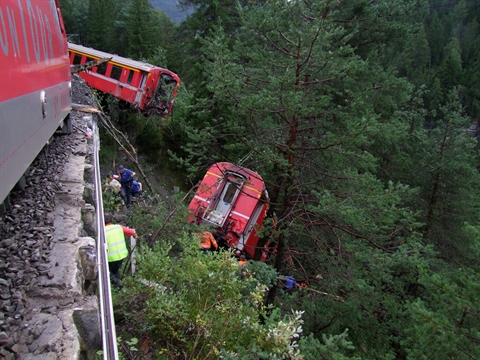
- The derailed carriages.

Details
- Date: 13 August 2014; 12:30 CEST
- Location: Tiefencastel, Graubünden
- Country: Switzerland
- Line: Albula Railway
- Operator: Rhaetian Railway
- Incident type: Derailment
- Cause: Landslide struck train

Statistics
- Trains: 1
- Passengers: 140
- Deaths: 1
- Injured: 10 (4 serious)

The Tiefencastel derailment occurred near the municipality of Tiefencastel, Switzerland, on 13 August 2014 when a passenger train travelling on the Albula Railway was struck by a landslide and derailed. Ten people were injured, four seriously, and 1 person died.

== Accident ==
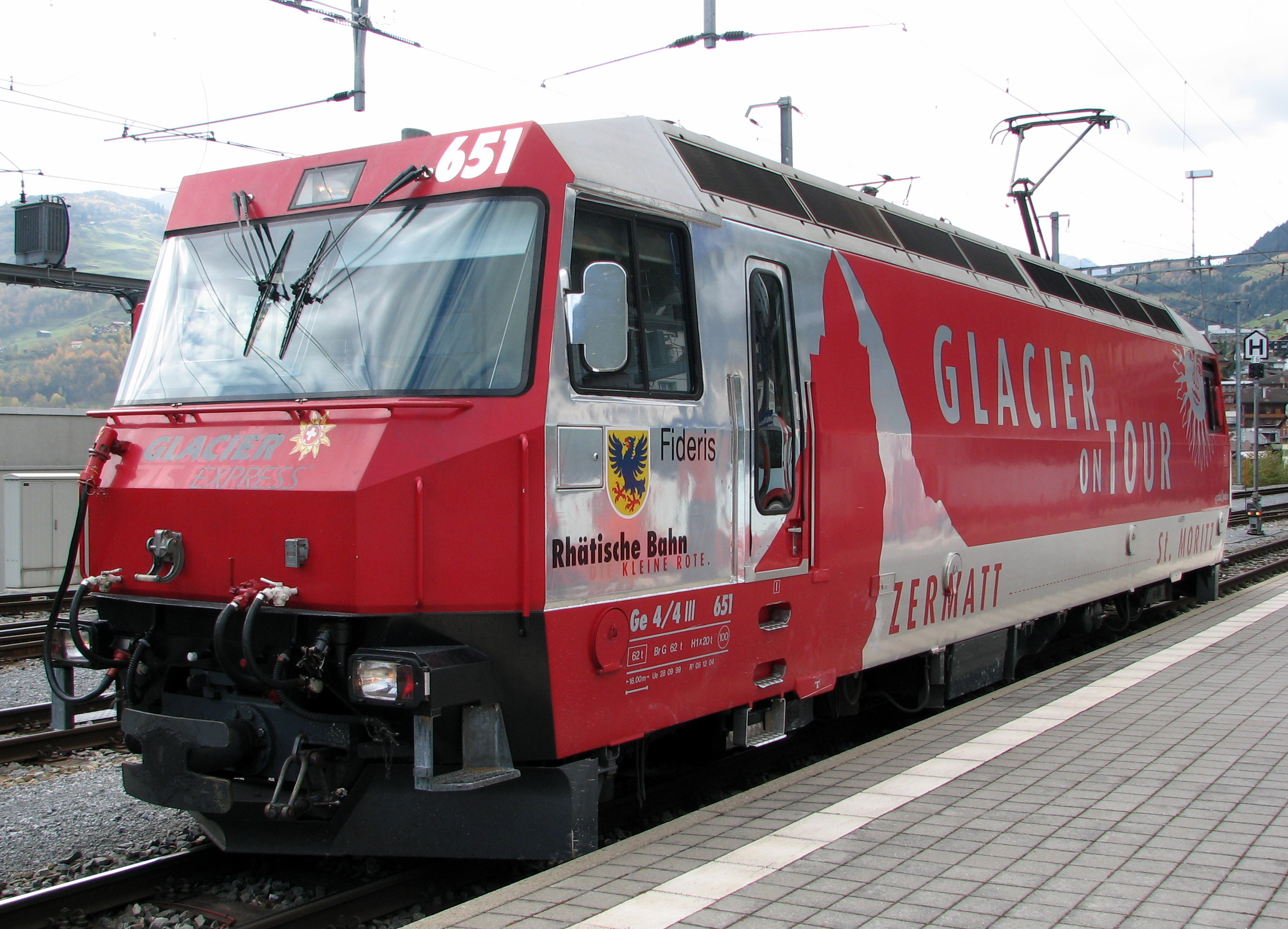
The train was hauled by this Ge 4-4 locomotive.

At 12:30 CEST (10:30 UTC) on 13 August 2014, a Rhaetian Railway passenger train on the Albula Railway was struck by a landslide and derailed. The train was travelling from St. Moritz to Chur. Of the seven-coach train, one carriage was left almost at right angles to the track down an embankment, and two others were derailed. Trees prevented the carriage from ending up in the Albula. Eleven people were injured, five seriously, and one of the seriously injured, an 85 year old man, later died. There were 140 passengers on the train. Two of the injured were Japanese and one was an Australian. The other eight victims were Swiss. In one of the derailed carriages, passengers moved to one side of the carriage in a bid to prevent it from plunging into a ravine. The train was hauled by Ge 4/4 III-class locomotive No. 651.

Four helicopters and eight ambulances assisted in the rescue operations. All the passengers had been evacuated within three hours of the accident. They were taken to Chur by bus to continue their journey by train. In a twelve-hour period before the accident, rainfall was recorded at a 50-60 litres per square metre, about half the average rainfall for the month of August in the area, according to a statement by MeteoSwiss. The railway reopened on 16 August. On that date, six people remained in hospital with injuries described as "non life threatening".

== Investigation ==
The Swiss Accident Investigation Board has opened an investigation into the accident. A separate investigation was opened by the Canton of Graubünden.

== Similar accidents ==
Other instances of trains actually being struck by falling rocks and being derailed include -

- 1 January 1883 - At Vriog (now Friog), Merionethshire, United Kingdom, the locomotive of a Cambrian Railways passenger train was struck by falling rocks and pushed into the Irish Sea. Both engine crew were killed. The first carriage was derailed, but there were no injuries amongst the passengers.
- 4 March 1933 - Also at Vriog, the locomotive of a Great Western Railway passenger train ran into falling rocks and was pushed into the Irish Sea. Both engine crew were killed.
- 8 February 2014 - At Annot, Alpes-de-Haute-Provence, France, a passenger train of the Chemins de Fer de Provence was struck by a landslide and derailed. Two people were killed and twenty were injured.
