= 2010 in France =

- Decades: 1990s; 2000s; 2010s; 2020s; 2030s
- See also: History of France; Timeline of French history; List of years in France

This article lists events from the year 2010 in France.

== Incumbents ==
- President – Nicolas Sarkozy
- Prime Minister – François Fillon

== Events ==
=== January ===
- 10 January – Referendum in Martinique and French Guiana.

=== February ===
- 12 to 28 February – During Olympic Games in Vancouver, the French team wins 11 medals:
  - Gold medals
    - Vincent Jay
    - Jason Lamy-Chappuis
  - Silver medals
    - Déborah Anthonioz
    - Martin Fourcade
    - biathlon women team (Marie-Laure Brunet, Sylvie Becaert, Marie Dorin and Sandrine Bailly)
  - Bronze medals
    - Marie Dorin
    - Tony Ramoin
    - Marie-Laure Brunet
    - Vincent Jay
    - Marion Josserand
    - Mathieu Bozzetto
- 28 February – The storm Xynthia kills at least 51 people, with 12 more said to be missing.

=== March ===
- 14 to 21 March – Regionales elections.
- 22 March - UMP suffers heavy defeat during Regionales elections.
- 12 to 21 March: In the 2010 Winter Paralympics France wins 6 medals.

=== June ===
- 6 June – The 2010 French Open tennis tournament concludes at Stade Roland Garros, with Rafael Nadal winning the Men's Singles and Francesca Schiavone the Women's.
- 12–13 June - The 24 Hours of Le Mans was held at the Circuit de la Sarthe, Audi Sport North America won in the LMP1 Class with the drivers (Mike Rockenfeller, Timo Bernhard, Romain Dumas); Strakka Racing won in the LMP2 Class with the drivers (Nick Leventis, Danny Watts, Jonny Kane); Team Felbermayr-Proton won in the LMGT2 Class with the drivers (Marc Lieb, Richard Lietz, Wolf Henzler), and Larbre Compétition won in the LMGT1 Class with the drivers (Roland Bervillé, Julien Canal, Gabriele Gardel)
- 14 June - President Nicolas Sarkozy announced €45 billion (US$55 billion) in budget cuts, the details were not announced at the time.
- 16 June - Mediapart published parts of secretly recorded conversation between Liliane Bettencourt and her financial advisors. They contains information regarding tax evasion and alleged ties to politicians, including President Nicolas Sarkozy
- 28 June - Finance Minister Christine Lagarde said that further announcements would be made regarding the budget cuts, after negotiations.

=== July ===
- 1 July - The start of the trial of François-Marie Banier was adjourned to allow police to investigate the secret recordings.
- 6 July - Former bookkeeper for Liliane Bettencourt alleged in a media interview that President Nicolas Sarkozy was receiving illegal campaign donations in cash from the Bettencourt's.
- 9 July – Carmaker PSA Peugeot Citroen finalises a venture with Chinese carmaker Changan Automotive, which will see Peugeot and Citroen both buildings cars in China in the near future.
- 12 July - Police searched the homes of François-Marie Banier and Liliane Bettencourt
- 13 July - Budget Minister and Treasurer of the UMP party, Éric Woerth, resigned as party treasurer amid mounting pressure.
- 15 July - Police detained four people close to Liliane Bettencourt for questioning, including François-Marie Banier, her wealth manager, tax lawyer, and the manager of a property in the Seychelles.
- Tour de France

=== August ===
- 19 August - The first charter flight carrying Roma deportees to Bucharest took off.
- 22 - August - The French government reported the dismantling of 88 Roma camps.
- 25 August – The new Renault Latitude is launched at the 2010 Moscow International Motor Show and is due on sale later this year for other markets. The European-spec Latitude will be launched at the 2010 Paris Motor Show.

=== September ===
- 7 September – The first of the 2010 French pension reform strikes takes place. The strikes, involving workers in both the public and private sectors, continue into October. The French government tried to raise the public pension age from 65 to 67 and the early pension age from 60 to 62.
- 29 September - The French Government showed the 2011 budget to parliament, which included €40 billion (US$54 billion) in spending cuts.

=== October ===
- 2010 French pension reform strikes continue.

=== November ===
- 1 November - My Chemical Romance on Tour Cigale
- 2 November - France concludes military and nuclear accord with UK. Under the terms of the new treaty, the two countries will cooperate in testing nuclear warheads.
- 4–13 November – Fencing World Championship in Paris
- 23 November - 2010 French pension reform strikes end.

=== December ===
- 6 December - Liliane Bettencourt and her daughter Françoise Bettencourt Meyers reconciled, leading to the abandonment of the initial legal proceedings related to the family dispute. However, investigations into criminal allegations of tax evasion and illegal political donations continued in Bordeaux.

== Births ==
- 28 May – Louis, Duke of Burgundy – elder son of Prince Louis, Duke of Anjou
- 29 April - Abigaël Sarah Ruth Menoni

== Deaths ==
- 7 January – Philippe Séguin – politician (born 1943)
- 10 January – Mano Solo – singer (born 1963)
- 11 January – Éric Rohmer – film director (born 1920)
- 23 January – Roger Pierre – actor (born 1923)
- 31 January – Pierre Vaneck – actor (born 1931)
- 3 February – Georges Wilson – actor and theater director (born 1921)
- 6 March – Roger Gicquel – television newsreader (born 1933)
- 7 March – Patrick Topaloff – singer and actor (born 1944)
- 8 March – Guy Lapébie – cyclist (born 1916)
- 13 March – Jean Ferrat – singer (born 1930)
- 11 April – Jean Boiteux, swimmer (born 1933).
- 31 August – Laurent Fignon, cyclist (born 1960)
- 12 September – Claude Chabrol, French film director (born 1930)
- 27 December – Bernard-Pierre Donnadieu, actor (born 1949)
