= 2013 in France =

- Decades: 1990s; 2000s; 2010s; 2020s; 2030s
- See also: History of France; Timeline of French history; List of years in France

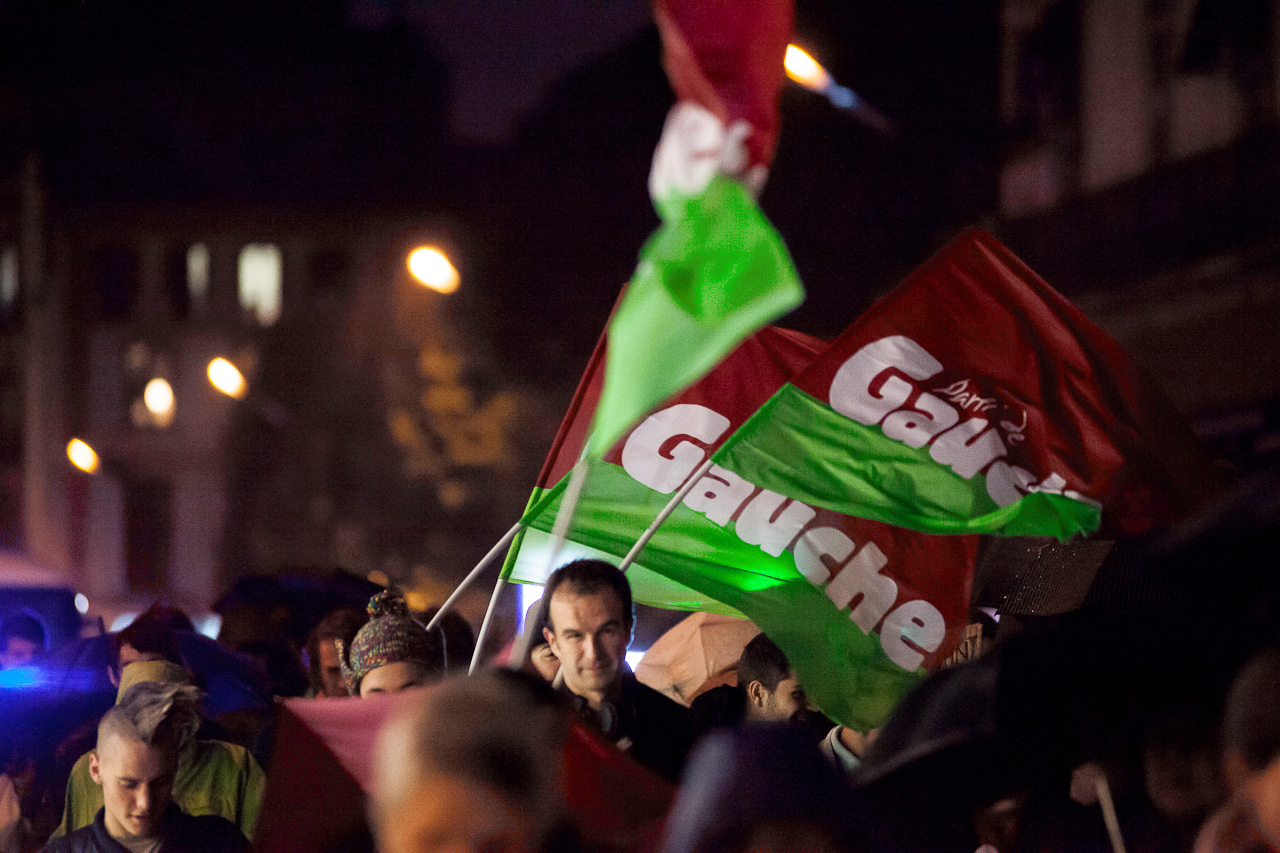
People march waving flags during a demonstration against expulsions of foreign students on November 5th, 2013 in Toulouse.

This article lists events from the year 2013 in France:

== Incumbents ==
- President – François Hollande (Socialist)
- Prime Minister – Jean-Marc Ayrault (Socialist)

== Events ==
=== January ===
- 2 January – A fire in an apartment block in the Paris suburb Gennevilliers kills 5 people and injures 18.
- 11 January
  - President François Hollande confirms French participation in operations in Mali against Islamist armed groups.
  - Two French soldiers and seventeen militants are killed in the town Bulo Marer, Mali, during a failed rescue attempt to free a French hostage known by the pseudonym "Denis Allex". Allex is also to have been reported to have been killed.
- 13 January – A mass rally is held in Paris protesting against government plans to legalise same-sex marriage.
- 17 January – Somalian militant group al Shabaab claim they have executed French hostage "Denis Allex". This contradicts the government's claim that Allex was killed during the failed hostage rescue attempt six days previously.
- 21 January – A gas leak at a Lubrizol chemical plant near Rouen prompts thousands of calls to emergency services complaining of foul smelling air across north-eastern France and parts of southern England. In a statement, the Ministry of the Interior reassures that the gas is not harmful at the quantities released.
- 28 January – Comments made by the employment minister Michel Sapin, who in a radio interview called the country "totally bankrupt", are rebuffed by the finance minister Pierre Moscovici as "inappropriate".

=== February ===
- 1 February – An agreement is signed between Google Inc. and François Hollande for the company to invest €60 million into a fund to help develop the French media's internet presence. In return, French publishers agree to drop their demand for the company to pay license fees for showing their headlines and article portions in search engine results.
- 10 February – Police investigating a series of sexual assaults in Marseille arrest a pair of twins after DNA evidence recovered from the scenes is unable to determine which one is to blame, if at all.
- 12 February – The National Assembly approves a bill extending rights to marry and adopt to homosexual couples by 329–229.
- 14 February – Meat processing firm Spanghero is accused by the government of knowingly labelling meat containing horsemeat as beef. As a result, the company's license to operate is suspended. The suspension is partially lifted four days later.
- 21 February – Minister for Industrial Renewal Arnaud Montebourg criticises comments made by the CEO of Titan Tire Corporation Maurice Taylor about the perceived poor work ethic of French employees, calling them "perfect ignorance".

=== March ===
- 2 March –
- 12 March
  - A cold snap causes exceptional snow and ice cover across north and north-western France. 27 départments declare an amber alert, and 200,000 people are reported to be without electricity.
  - François Hollande confirms that France will miss the 3% deficit target he pledged as part of his presidential campaign the previous year. The deficit for 2013 is projected to be 3.7% of GDP output.
- 16 March – Despite a 23–16 win over Scotland, France finishes last in the 2013 Six Nations Championship for the first time since 1999.
- 19 March – Jérôme Cahuzac, a junior minister at the Ministry of the Economy, Finances and Industry resigns amid allegations of tax fraud.
- 30 March – Separate building fires in Saint-Quentin and Aubervilliers claim the lives of 8 people, including 5 children.

=== April ===
- 2 April – After previously denying having secret foreign bank account to evade tax, Jérôme Cahuzac admits to hiding €600,000 in a Swiss account for more than 20 years.
- 9 April – French troops begin their withdrawal from Mali, almost four months after being deployed.
- 13 April – Convicted criminal Rédoine Faïd escapes from a prison in Sequedin. A European-wide arrest assault is subsequently issued against him.
- 23 April – The French Parliament passes a bill legalising same-sex marriage and adoption by same-sex couples.
- 25 April – New figures show that unemployment has reached 3.2 million, with the number of jobseekers at their highest since records began in January 1996.

=== May ===
- 5 May – Protests in Paris numbering in the tens of thousands mark François Hollande's first year in power, with many supporters of leftist parties expressing dissatisfaction over his handling of the economy.
- 12 May
  - Paris Saint-Germain secure their third Ligue 1 title, and their first since 1994, with a 1–0 victory over Lyon.
  - Five-year-old Fiona Chafoulais is reported missing in Clermont-Ferrand.
- 15 May – Official figures released today show that the economy has returned to recession, with the first quarter of 2013 showing a contraction of 0.2%.
- 18 May – François Hollande signs the bill legalising same-sex marriage and adoption by same-sex couple into law.
- 21 May – Amid debate on overturning the Toubon Law and extending the availability of courses run in the English language in universities, Libération expresses support for a repeal by running a front cover entirely in English, with the headline "Let's Do It".
- 25 May – A French soldier is wounded by an unknown assailant while on duty in La Défense. The attack is being treated as a terrorist incident and is seen as a possible copycat attack to that of Lee Rigby, who was murdered in Woolwich four days previously.
- 29 May – The first French same-sex marriage is officiated in the city of Montpellier by the mayor, Hélène Mandroux-Colas.

=== June ===
- 9 June – Protesters objecting to the legalisation of same-sex marriage are removed from the final of the 2013 French Open between Rafael Nadal and David Ferrer for disrupting play.
- 11 June – A three-day strike by air traffic controllers begins in protest against European Union plans to create a single European airspace.
- 20 June – Heavy rainfall in the Pyrenees causes flash floods, killing 3 people. The floods heavily affect pilgrimages to Lourdes, forcing the closure of the shrine and the evacuation of thousands of tourists from their hotels.
- 22–23 June – The 81st edition of the 24 Hours of Le Mans is held at the Circuit de la Sarthe and is won by Dane Tom Kristensen, Briton Allan McNish and Frenchman Loïc Duval. The race is however marred by the death of Allan Simonsen on lap 3, the first fatality at the event in 16 years.
- 29 June – The 100th edition of the Tour de France begins in Porto-Vecchio in Corsica.

=== July ===
- 2 July – François Hollande sacks environment minister Delphine Batho after she publicly criticises government budget cuts. Phillipe Martin is named as her replacement.
- 3 July – The plane carrying Bolivian President Evo Morales is denied permission to fly over French airspace due to the mistaken belief that American fugitive Edward Snowden is on board. The incident provokes harsh criticism from heads of government across South America, as well as demonstrations outside the French embassy in La Paz.
- 4 July – An investigation by Le Monde accuses the government of mass electronic surveillance of the French people, stating that data sent via "emails, SMSs, telephone calls, Facebook and Twitter posts" is collected and stored in Paris.
- 6 July – Marion Bartoli wins her first Wimbledon title, beating Germany's Sabine Lisicki in two sets. It is the first French win at Wimbledon since Amélie Mauresmo in 2006.
- 10 July – Three far-right groups are banned by the government following the killing of a left-wing activist student, Clement Maric, on 6 June. The groups deny involvement in Meric's death.
- 12 July – A train crash in Brétigny-sur-Orge kills 7 people and injures 20. François Hollande visits the scene within hours, calling the accident "a catastrophe". It is the worst train crash on French soil for 25 years.
- 28 July – High winds and strong currents off the Hérault coast cause the deaths of 7 men on 6 different beaches.

=== August ===
- 1 August – The former energy minister of Kazakhstan and former head of BTA Bank Mukhtar Ablyazov, accused of embezzling billions of dollars, is arrested in Cannes.
- 2 August – The government unveils a bill to revitalise France's deprived suburbs, which if passed, will see €5 billion invested into deprived areas to create employment and improve housing conditions.
- 8 August – Farmers in Brittany protest low egg prices and high production costs by smashing eggs in large quantities, vowing to destroy 100,000 eggs per day until 11 August.
- 30 August – François Hollande backs US plans for a military response to Syria's alleged chemical weapon usage one week earlier. Hollande's announcement comes one day after the United Kingdom's decision not to commit in a military capacity, leaving France as the only major country supporting the United States' position.

=== September ===
- 4 September – The President of Germany, Joachim Gauck, becomes the first German head of state to visit Oradour-sur-Glane, where 642 inhabitants of the village were massacred by German soldiers in 1944.
- 11 September – Police seize 1.3 tonnes of cocaine packed into 30 separate suitcases on an Air France flight at Charles de Gaulle Airport. The drugs, which arrived from Caracas, Venezuela, are estimated to be worth around €200 million.
- 14 September – Robert Lund, who was convicted of the murder of his wife Evelyn, is released from prison.
- 25 September – Human rights campaigners and the European Commission criticise Interior minister Manuel Valls for comments he made stating that "a majority" of Roma people should be expelled from the country because so few integrate into French society. Valls stands by his comments, stating that "My remarks only shock those who don't know the subject".

=== October ===
- 11 October – The Constitutional Council of France upholds the law banning hydraulic fracturing after a challenge by US-based firm Schuepbach Energy.
- 17 October – Thousands of pupils march in Paris protesting against the expulsion of two foreign teenage students from the country for violating immigration laws.
- 26 October – 3 are injured in Finistère when protests by agricultural workers over a new road tax on vehicles over 3.5 tonnes turns violent.
- 29 October – A BVA poll shows that François Hollande's approval rating stands at 26%, the lowest ever recorded for a French President.
- 30 October – 4 French hostages are freed in Niger, having been held captive since September 2010.

=== November ===
- 8 November – Standard & Poor's cuts France's credit rating from AA+ to AA, citing high unemployment and lack of government reforms in stimulating economic growth. It comes almost two years since France lost its top AAA rating.
- 16 November – Around 2000 freight trucks block major roads around Paris, Marseille, Lyon and other large cities in an organised protest against the proposed road tax on vehicles exceeding 3.5 tonnes.
- 18 November – A lone gunman fires shots at the headquarters of Libération and, 90 minutes later, at the headquarters of Societe Generale, seriously injuring 1 person.
- 21 November – Police arrest a suspect in connection with the shootings in Paris on 18 November. The suspect is named as Abdelhakim Dekhar. He is charged with attempted murder and kidnapping two days later.
- 28 November – A survey by the European Commission finds that consumer confidence fell sharply in November, with the French more pessimistic about the state of the national economy compared to other Eurozone countries.
- 29 November – MPs debate a bill that would introduce a fine of €1,500 to those caught paying for sex.

=== December ===
- 2 December – One thousand French soldiers arrive in the Central African Republic to help stem the rising tide of sectarian violence in the country.
- 4 December – The National Assembly passes the bill imposing fines on those being caught using prostitutes by a 268-138 margin.
- 5 December – The United Nations Security Council passes Resolution 2127, giving authorisation for French soldiers in the Central African Republic to use force to prevent civilian casualties.
- 10 December – Two French soldiers are killed in fighting in the Central African Republic capital of Bangui. They are the first French casualties of the conflict.
- 18 December – The world's first artificial heart transplant is performed by doctors at the Georges Pompidou Hospital in Paris.
- 24 December – The national institute for statistics INSEE announces that France has avoided sliding back into recession during the second half of the year. It reports that the economy grew by 0.4% in the final quarter of 2013, after contracting by 0.1% in the third quarter.
- 30 December – The Constitutional Council rules that a new tax levied on companies paying salaries of more than €1m is lawful.

=== See also ===
- 2012–13 Ligue 1
- 2012–13 Ligue 2
- 2012–13 Championnat National
- 2012–13 Championnat de France Amateur
- 2012–13 Championnat de France Amateur 2
- 2012–13 Coupe de France
- 2012–13 Coupe de la Ligue
- 2013 Trophée des Champions
