= Annot derailment =

2014 railway incident in France

Coordinates: 43.9583°N 6.6773°E

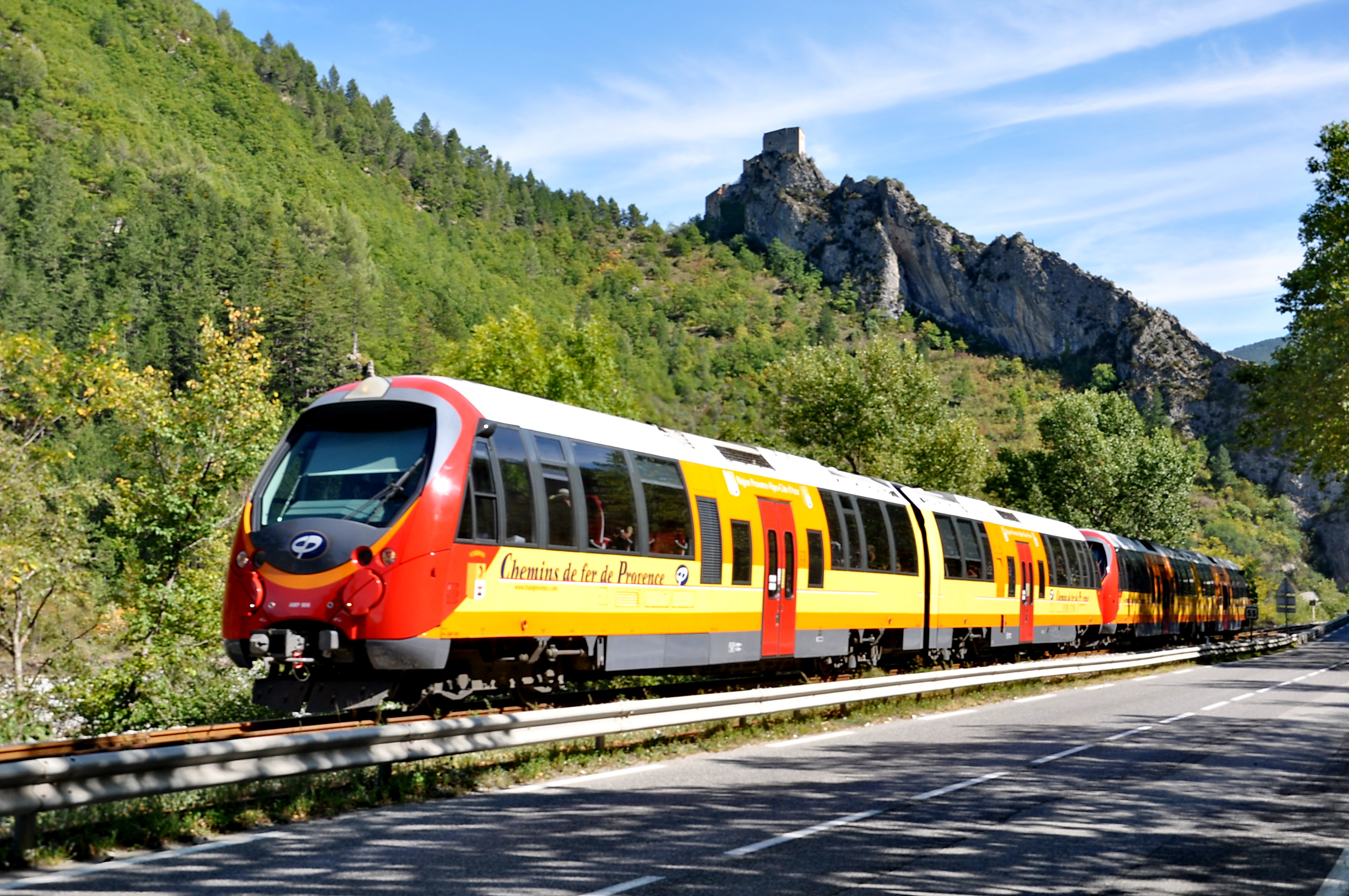
- The train involved in the accident was a type AMP800 diesel multiple unit

Details
- Date: 8 February 2014
- Location: Between Annot and Saint-Benoît, Alpes-de-Haute-Provence
- Country: France
- Line: Nice – Digne-les-Bains
- Operator: Chemins de Fer de Provence
- Incident type: Derailment
- Cause: Rockfall

Statistics
- Trains: One
- Passengers: 34
- Deaths: 2
- Injured: 20

The Annot derailment occurred on 8 February 2014 when a train travelling from Nice to Digne-les-Bains on the Chemins de Fer de Provence was hit by a rock which fell down a mountain side. Both vehicles of the train were derailed, killing two people and injuring 20 others.

== Derailment ==
At 11:10 local time (10:10 UTC) on 8 February 2014, the 09:25 passenger train travelling from Nice to Digne-les-Bains operated by the Chemins de Fer de Provence was derailed when it was struck by a 10 tonnes (22,000 lb) boulder which fell down a mountain and hit the train as it was passing. Two people were killed and 20 were injured. Both victims were travelling in the part of the train that was struck by the debris. The train was carrying 34 passengers in addition to the driver. The train involved was an AMP800 diesel multiple unit.

The crash occurred in a remote location between Annot and Saint-Benoît, Alpes-de-Haute-Provence. Two helicopters were sent to the scene, as well as 110 firefighters in 32 vehicles. Those not requiring medical attention were evacuated to Annot. The two dead were a 49-year-old Russian national and an 82-year-old French national, both female. Four people remained in hospital at least overnight.

== Investigation ==
An investigation into the crash was begun by the French Land Transport Accident Investigation Bureau (BEA-TT) and the Institut de recherche criminelle de la gendarmerie nationale (IRCGN) on 9 February. The scene was scanned with lasers and a 3D computer generated recreation of the accident was made to assist with the investigation. The line was to remain closed whilst the investigation continued, with no firm date set for reopening. It was reported that the weather in the preceding days had been alternating between rain and snow, with the freeze-thaw effect possibly contributing to the cause of the rockfall. The two train event recorders were retrieved from the wreckage of the train on 18 February.

== Aftermath ==
As of 25 February 2014, the railway was still closed; Route nationale 202 (RN 202), which was below the railway, was also closed, as it had been since the derailment. This resulted in numerous and diverse transport problems in the small towns in the area. A mayors' meeting scheduled for 26 February at Dignes was to call for a quick RN 202 reopening.

== Similar incidents ==
- 1 January 1883 – At Vriog, Merionethshire, United Kingdom, the locomotive of a Cambrian Railways passenger train was struck by falling rocks and pushed into the Irish Sea. Both engine crew were killed. The first carriage was derailed, but there were no injuries amongst the passengers.
- 4 March 1933 – At Vriog, the locomotive of a Great Western Railway freight train is struck by falling rocks and pushed into the Irish Sea. Both engine crew are killed.
- 13 August 2014 – At Tiefencastel, Switzerland, a passenger train was derailed by a landslide that struck the train. Eleven people were injured.
