= Welcome Real Time =

Software company in France

Welcome Real-time
- Company type: Private
- Industry: Software edition & Services
- Founded: 1996
- Defunct: 2014
- Fate: Acquired by Collinson Group
- Headquarters: Aix-en-Provence, France
- Key people: Philippe David President
- Products: Value added services for banks
- Number of employees: 79
- Website: www.welcome-rt.com

Welcome Real Time (also Welcome Real-time) was a publisher of customer relationship solutions founded in 1996 and based in Aix-en-Provence, France.

== History ==
The company was founded in 1996 by Aneace Haddad in Aix-en-Provence, France. The company expanded to include clients in Brazil in 2001. Its solution was used by the Turkish bank Akbank. Eleven years later, in 2012, the company opened new offices in São Paulo.

In 2011, the Russian Standard Bank chose the company's Welcome XLS solution to support management of rewards programs across all of their issued credit cards. This year also saw the company acquire the Singaporean company Axiomatic, and branch out into loyalty program consulting.

In 2012, the company released a point-of-sale solution called "The Loyalty Impact: At Store", which it marketed to banks who then re-sold the service to retailers. The service provided a discount coupon, redeemable at next purchase, to customers in addition to a sales receipt upon completion of a sale. The new solution was used by Barclaycard.

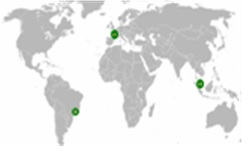
Welcome Real-time offices in the world

In 2012, the company entered Iceland via Valitor, which adopted the Welcome XLS solution, and made it in Red Herring's Europe Top 100. In September 2014, Collinson Group acquired Welcome Real Time to improve the group's loyalty capability.
