= Annot =

Commune in southeastern France

- Commune
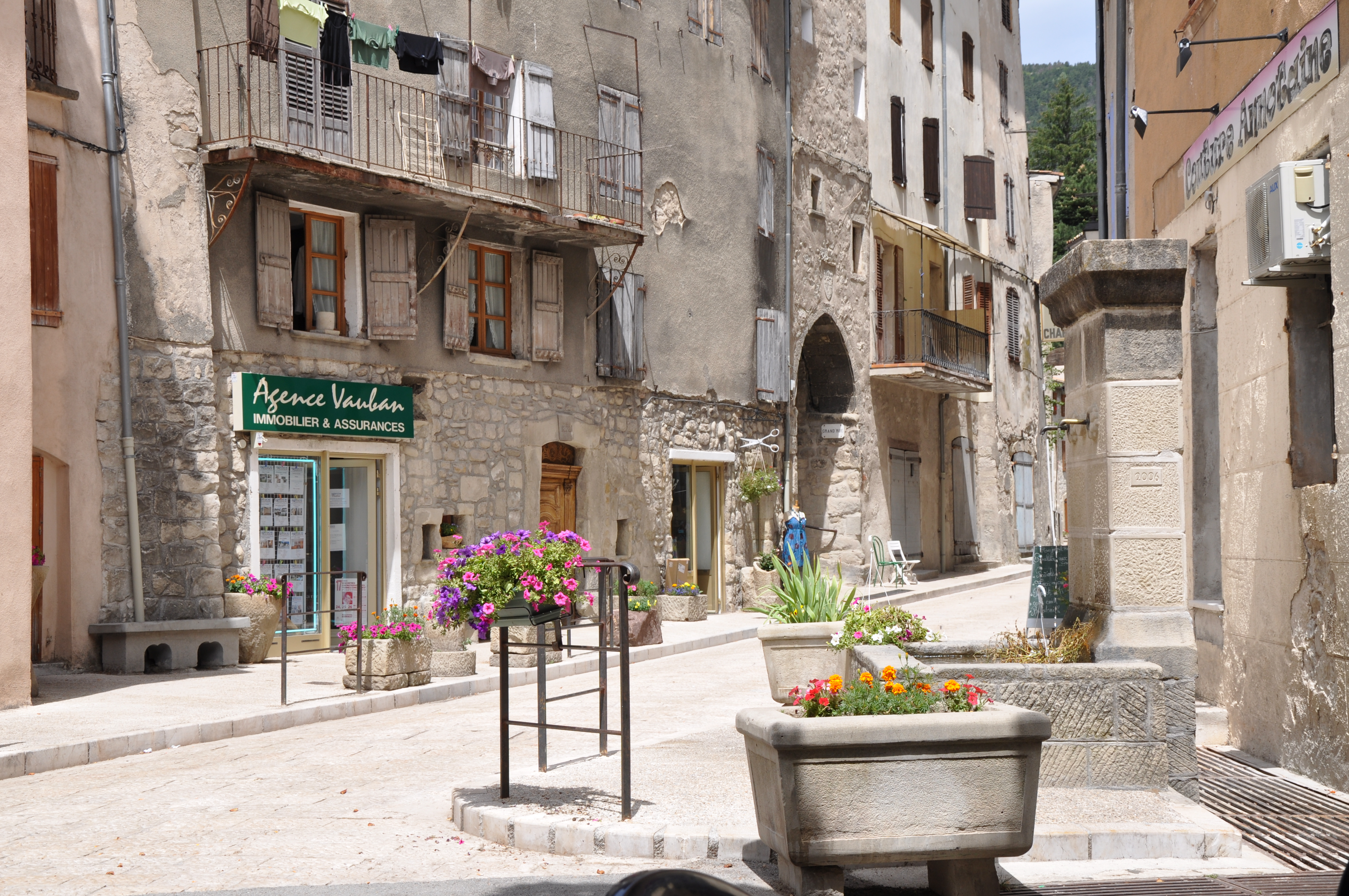
- Entrance to the old town of Annot

- Coat of arms
- Location of Annot
- Location within France Location within Provence-Alpes-Côte d'Azur
- Coordinates: 43°57′57″N 6°40′10″E
- Country: France
- Region: Provence-Alpes-Côte d'Azur
- Department: Alpes-de-Haute-Provence
- Arrondissement: Castellane
- Canton: Castellane
- Intercommunality: Alpes Provence Verdon - Sources de Lumière

Government
  - Mayor (2026–32): Marion Cozzi
- Area^{1}: 29.8 km^{2} (11.5 sq mi)
- Elevation: 680 m (2,230 ft)
- Highest elevation: 1,638 m (5,374 ft)
- Lowest elevation: 599 m (1,965 ft)
- Population (2023): 1,009
  - Density: 33.9/km^{2} (87.7/sq mi)
- Time zone: UTC+01:00 (CET)
  - Summer (DST): UTC+02:00 (CEST)
- INSEE/Postal code: 04008 /04240
- ^{1} French Land Register data, which excludes lakes, ponds, glaciers > 1 km^{2} (0.386 sq mi or 247 acres) and river estuaries.

Annot (French pronunciation: [anɔt]; Occitan: Anòt) is a commune in the Alpes-de-Haute-Provence department in the Provence-Alpes-Côte d'Azur region of southeastern France.

The commune has been awarded one flower by the National Council of Towns and Villages in Bloom in the Competition of cities and villages in Bloom.

== Geography ==
Annot is located some 80 km north-west of Nice, 15 km east of Saint-Andre-les-Alpes, and 13 km west of Puget-Theniers. Access to the commune is by National Road N202 from Saint-Andre-les-Alpes to Puget-Theniers which passes through the south of the commune. Access to the village is by road D908 running north off the N202 and continuing north to Le Fugeret. There are two railway stations in the commune: Scaffarels station, an optional stop built on a masonry embankment; and Annot Railway Station near the village. They are both served by the line from Nice to Digne.

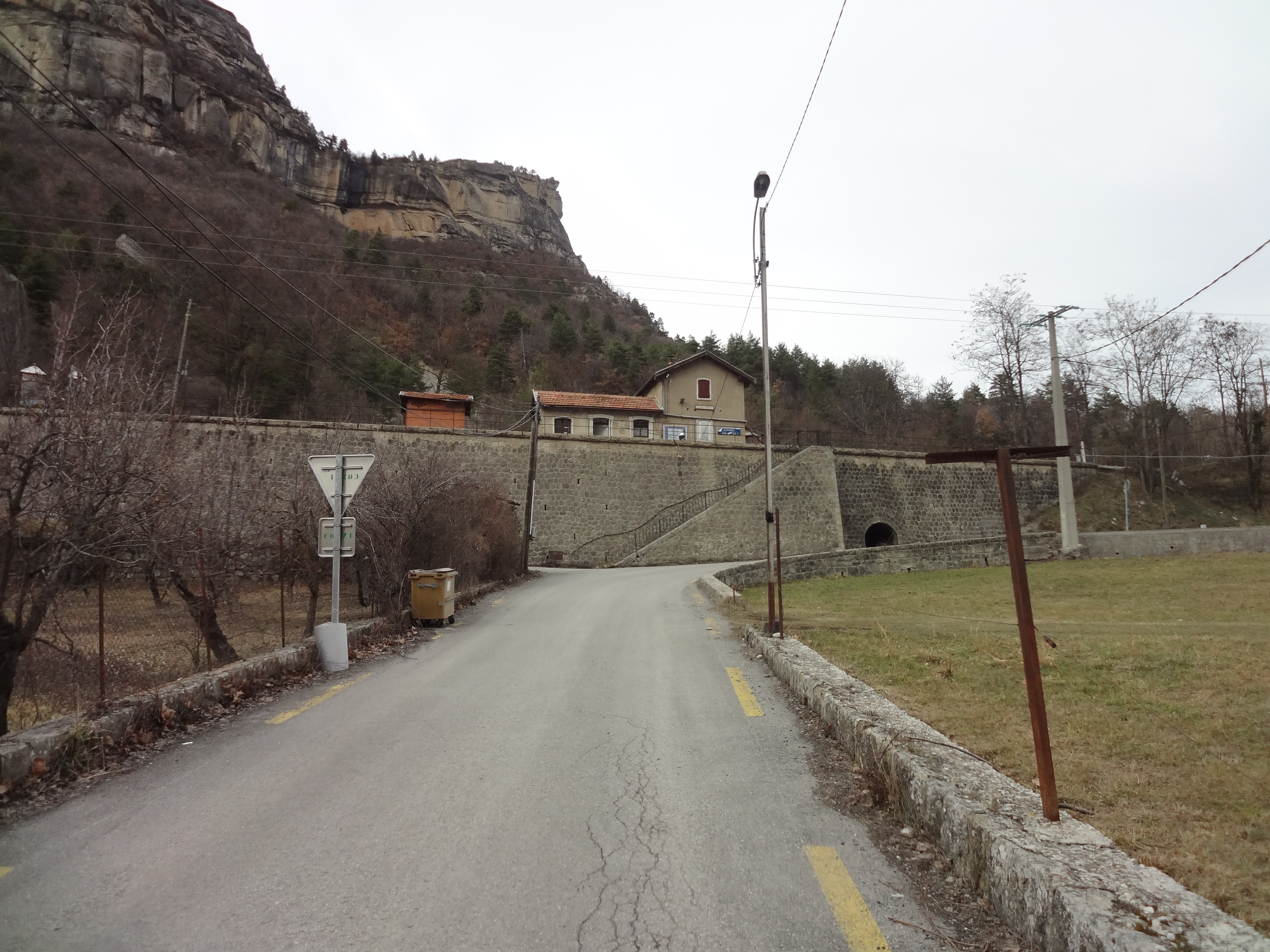
Scaffarels Station built on a masonry embankment.

The hamlet of Les Scaffarels is south-east of the village and there is also the hamlet of Rouaine on the N202 in the south. The commune is mountainous and heavily forested. The forests occupy 2,712 hectares of the commune.

The Galange river forms most of the southern border of the commune while the Vaire flows from north to south past the village gathering many tributaries through the commune. The Beite river joins the Vaire at the village while the Canal des Gastres flows south-east near the village then curves north to join the Coulomp just north-east of the commune.

=== Geology ===
The village is located within a resurgence of sandstone amidst limestone mountains at 680 m altitude. This resurgence is up to 250m thick. The rocky ridge overlooking the village is formed of sandstone. The debris that has formed below in picturesque shapes with names such as: the Dent du Diable (Tooth of the Devil), the Chambre du Roi (King's Chamber), the défilé des Garambes (Defile of Garambes), the Chameau des lumières (Camelback of lights), and the rocks of the Cent-Marches (Hundred Steps). It has been classed as a natural site since 1920. Certain houses have been built directly against a rock fallen from the crag: the rock is bigger than a house. The acidic soils on the left bank of the Vaïre allow for chestnut growing.

The centre of the town (Saint-Jean-Baptiste Church, formerly Saint-Pons) has been built on a rocky outcrop between the Vaïre and Beïte rivers.

High points

- Pelloussis Rock (1,340 m)
- Col de L'Iscle (1,384 m)
- on the same ridge west of the village: Le Roncheret (1,617 m), Le Puel (1,532 m), La Colle Durand (1,638 m), the Rocks of Rouaine (1,438 m)

=== Natural and technological risks ===
None of the 200 communes of the department is in a no seismic risk zone. The Canton of Annot is in zone 1b (low risk) according to the deterministic classification of 1991 based on the historical seismic data and in zone 4 (medium risk) according to the probabilistic classification EC8 of 2011. The town of Annot is also exposed to three other natural hazards:

- forest fire
- flooding (in the valley of the Vaïre)
- landslide

The commune of Annot is also exposed to the technological risk of the transport of dangerous goods by road. The N202 national road can be used by carriers of dangerous goods.

The foreseeable natural risk prevention plan (PPR) of the commune was approved in 1990 for flood risk, landslide, and earthquake but a new one was requested in 2003 and a DICRIM has existed since 2011.

The town has had several natural disasters from flooding and mudslides in 1994 and an earthquake powerfully felt in the town on 17 February 1947 whose epicentre was located in the Piedmont.

== Toponymy ==
The locality appears for the first time in charters of 1042 as Anoth when its Lord, Ermerincus of Anoth, gave it to the Abbey of Saint Victor, Marseille. The name perhaps comes from the Gallic ana plus the Latin suffix ottum designating a small marsh. Charles Rostaing thought that the name Ana designated it as an older town which preceded the upper town called Sigumanna. According to Daniel Thiery, the name Sigumanna, cited in the same document as Annot, means the territory rather than a place or a specific village and this name of the territory is probably derived from the name of pre-Roman people who occupied the valley.

The commune name is Anòt in Provençal.

The name of the hamlet of Rouaine comes from the Roman name *Rugius with the suffix -ane indicating the domain of Rugius.

== History ==
=== Antiquity ===
The name of the people settled in the valley on the arrival of the Romans is not certain, but it may be the Nemeturii. An oppidum was located at a place called Vers-la-Ville.

=== Middle Ages ===
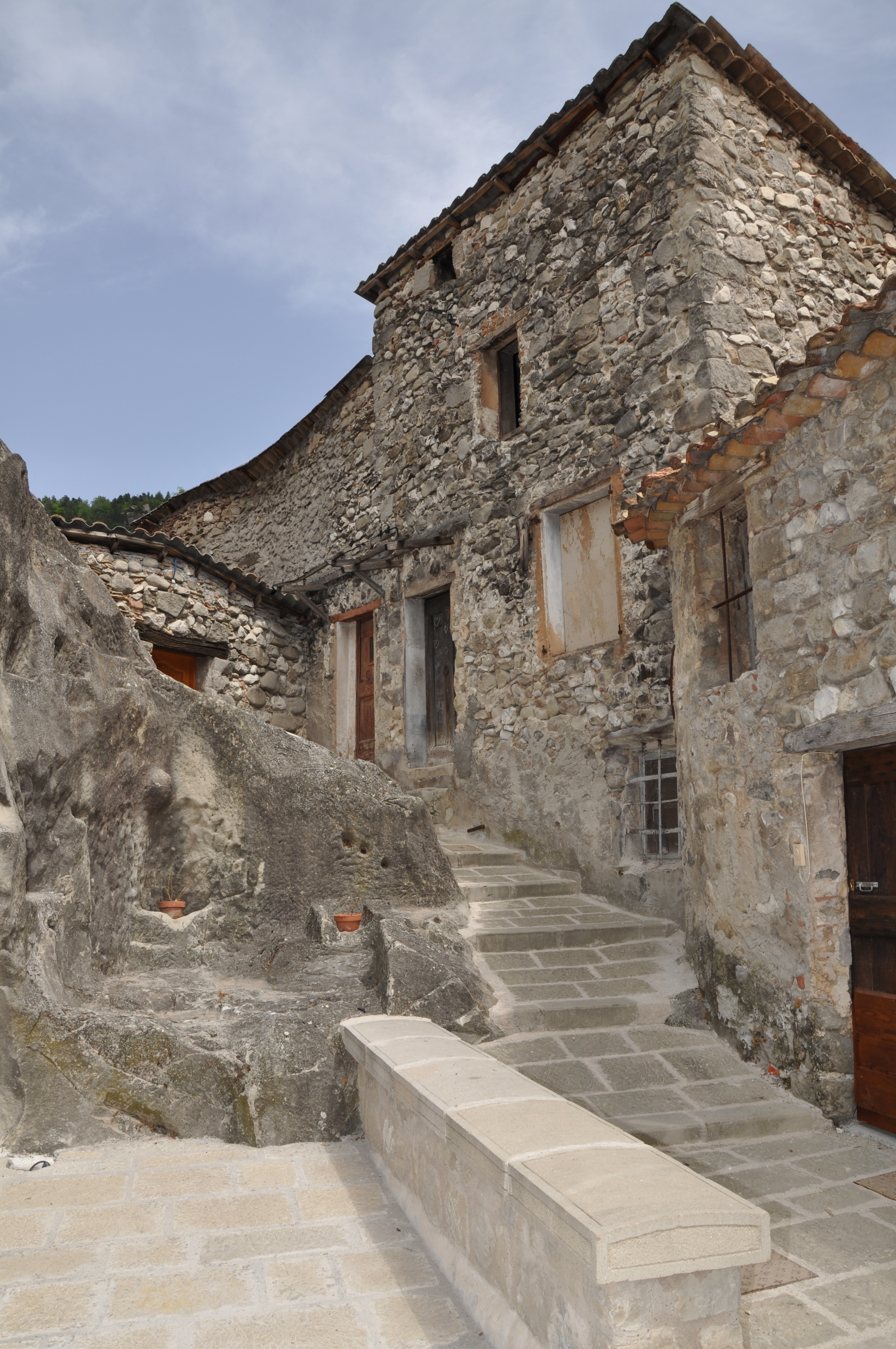
Old village

The original village was probably in the middle of "Grès d'Annot" (Annot sandstone). The houses were mostly wooden (locations for beams are visible in the rocks that the houses backed on to) and more than one floor. The path called "Vers-la-Ville" leading to a chapel is certainly a testimony to its past existence. On this path there is a large sandstone rock ("the rock of 100 steps") on which a staircase is carved. Around the rock's summit there are holes dug to accommodate wooden beams.

Subsequently, the village was built between the Vaïre and Beite rivers and was fortified around the church of Saint-Pons in 1042. The Lord was the Abbey of Saint Victor, Marseille, who received very many gifts. The Abbey shared some rights with the Order of the Temple. After the dissolution of the Order of the Temple, its property at Fugeret and Annot passed to the Abbey Saint-Pons of Nice.

The lordship then passed to the counts of Provence. The death of Queen Joanna I created a succession crisis for the head of the County of Provence. The towns of the Union of Aix (1382–1387) supported Charles de Duras against Louis I of Anjou. The Annot community supported Duras until 1386 then switched sides to join the Angevins through patient negotiations by Marie de Blois, widow of Louis I and regent for their son Louis II. The surrender of Aix could also have played a role in the turnaround of the community.

A Fair was established in 1388 by Marie de Blois which was maintained until the end of the Ancien Régime. She also authorised a weekly market. Finally in the 15th and 16th centuries it was the Saint-Pons family who were the Lords.

=== Modern times ===
During the Wars of religion the city was attacked by the Protestants in 1574 commanded by the Baron of l'Isle. Annot was spared the plague epidemics of 1626 and 1670 which nevertheless affected Castellane and Entrevaux.

In May 1672 the entire population of the village, led by the notaries and the apothecary, repulsed the new vicar who had been imposed by the diocese and not from the country.

At the end of the 17th century the village was gradually emerging from isolation: the Bishop of Entrevaux, Ithier, established a fortnightly postal service between Entrevaux and Aix by mules, which also served Annot and Guillaumes. The culture of Roman law, which requires frequent use of a notary, was very much alive: thus four notaries were established in Annot in 1680. In the 18th century a viguerie was installed at Annot which also served the communities of Braux, La Colle, Fugeret, Méailles, Argenton, Peyresc, and Saint-Benoît.

In June 1704, as part of the War of the Spanish Succession, a communal militia was raised at Ubraye and Annot. They were repulsed by the Savoyards in the Valley of Marguery, and many residents of both communities were taken prisoner. The ransom for those from Annot amounted to 1,200 livres.

=== The French Revolution ===
The community was fully part of the movement of the French Revolution. After sending their complaints in 1789, they planted a tree of liberty in the Place Revelly. The patriotic society of the commune was created during the summer of 1792: it was called the Club of Friends of the Revolution.

=== 19th and 20th centuries ===
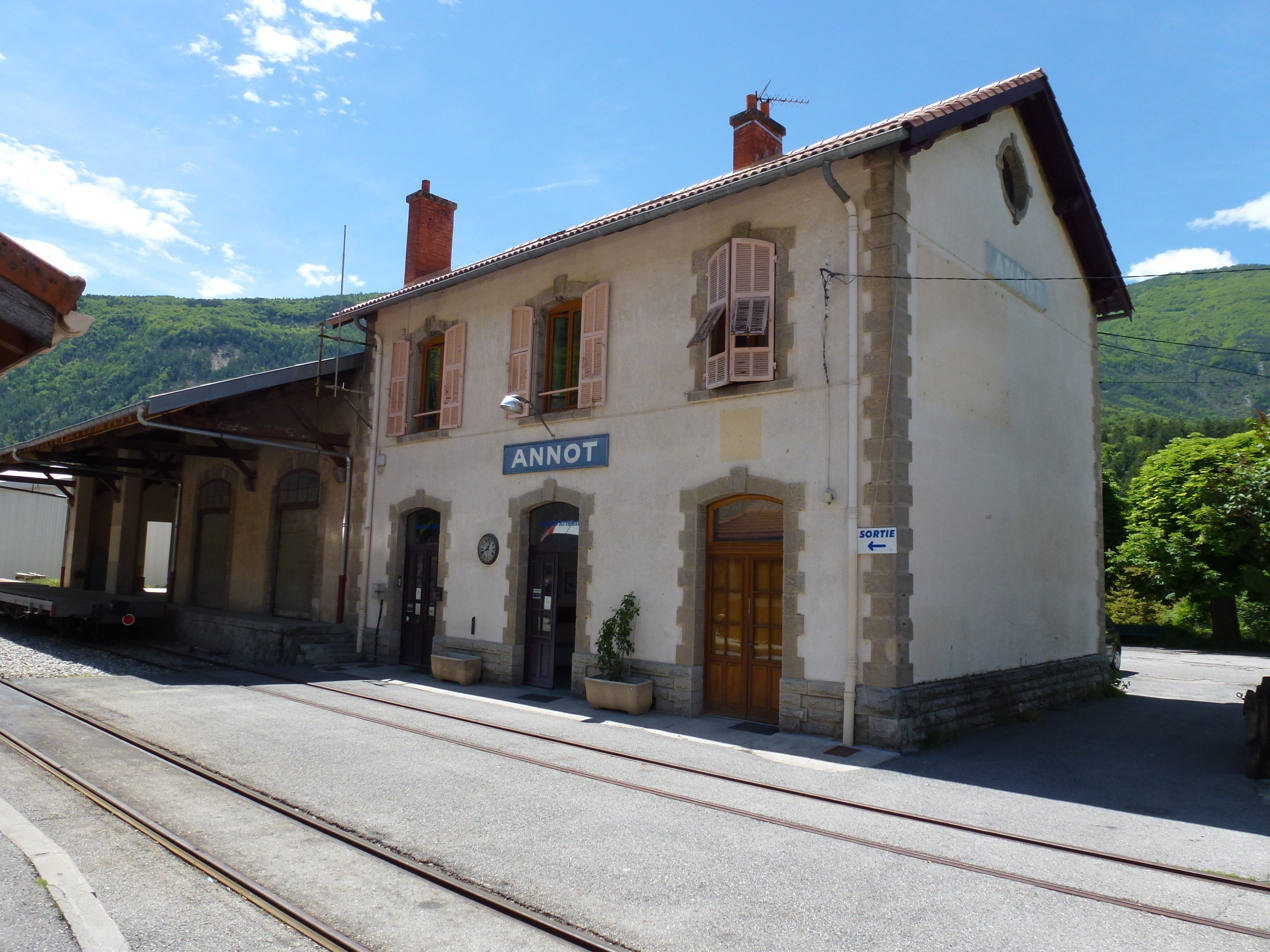
Annot Railway Station

In the 19th century the commune was experiencing some industrial development through the spinning and weaving of wool on the model of the Honnorat factory in Saint-André-de-Méouilles. The Moulard factory opened in the early 1830s and the Roux factory in 1836 (but it disappeared before 1843). In 1856 two factories employed 40 workers.

The railway arrived at Annot in 1908 with the opening of the penultimate section of the line from Nice to Digne. The Colle tunnel was completed in 1903 and the entire line between Nice and Digne was opened from 5 to 7 August 1911 in the presence of Victor Augagneur, Minister of Public Works.

During the First World War soldiers were assigned to Annot to defend the railway lines for Railways of Provence.

The doctor from Annot belonged to the Milice. His father was shot on 6 August 1944 by the Francs-Tireurs et Partisans from the 11th company.

Until the middle of the 20th century there was a vineyard in Annot whose production was consumed locally and was exported. There remains nothing now.

=== 21st century ===
On 9 February 2014, a rock tumbled down a mountainside and derailed a train on the Chemins de Fer de Provence near Annot, killing two passengers.

=== Heraldry ===
The town of Annot used at least two different shields, both making reference to chestnuts. The current arms of Annot are the second described below without picture.

Arms of Annot	These arms. are not dated. It is possible that they are the oldest in the community. Blazon: Azure, Fess of Argent charged with the word ANNOT in Roman capitals in Sable, in chief two chestnut branches of Or posed saltirewise and in base a fleur-de-lise the same.

blazon1	These arms existed in 1648 Blazon: Argent, a chestnut tree Vert charged with two hedgehogs of Or and with three fleurs-de-lis the same in base, 2 and 1.

== Administration ==
List of Successive Mayors

From	To	Name	Party
	1977	Fernand Faissole	
1977	2001	Yves Bono	
2001	2020	Jean Ballester	DVD
2020	Current	Marion Cozzi	

=== Inter-communality ===
Annot is part of:

- Since 2017: the Community of communes Alpes Provence Verdon - Sources de Lumière

=== Education ===
The commune has a computerized library (catalogue online).

The town has two educational institutions:

- a primary school;
- The Émile-Honnoraty College.

== Population ==
The inhabitants of the commune are known as Annotains or Annotaines in French.

Historical population
Year	Pop.	±% p.a.
1968	846	—
1975	859	+0.22%
1982	1,035	+2.70%
1990	1,053	+0.22%
1999	988	−0.71%
2007	1,019	+0.39%
2012	1,082	+1.21%
2017	1,042	−0.75%
2023	1,009	−0.53%
Source: INSEE

== Economy ==
In 2017, the active population amounted to 438 people, including 57 unemployed (13%). These workers are in majority employees (81%), and are in majority employed in the commune (71%). Most of the workers are employed in industry and construction (56% in 2015). Agriculture does not provide any employment. Services and administration, with 134 jobs, takes up the remaining 44% of the working population. At the end of 2015 establishments active in the town were mainly shops and services (87 out of 142 establishments) followed by firms in the secondary sector (27), the government, health, the social sector, and education (25 establishments).

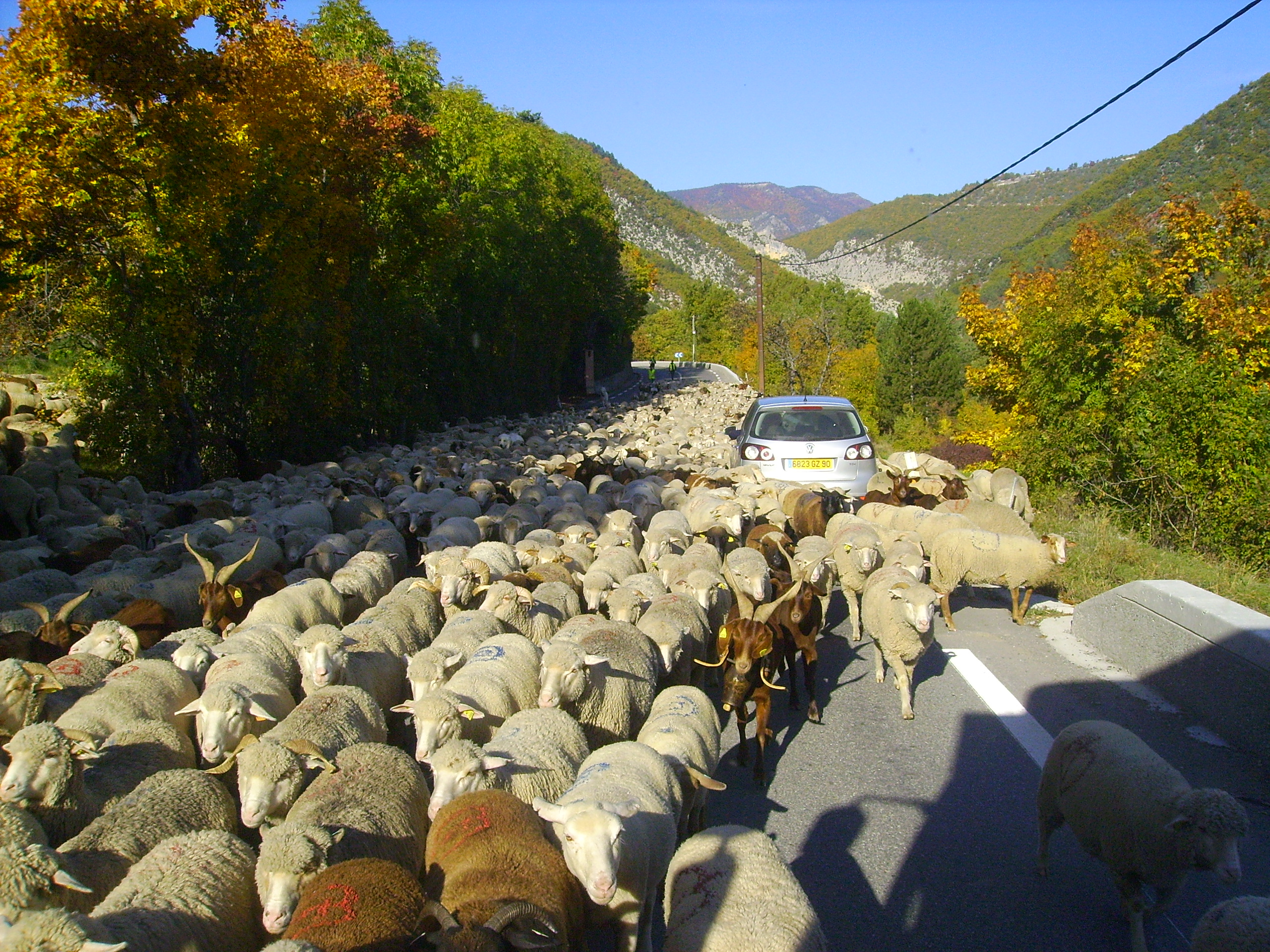
Flock of Sheep

At the end of 2015 the primary sector (agriculture, forestry, fisheries) had 3 different establishments. A cheese bears the appellation Fromage d'Annot or Tomme d'Annot.

At the end of 2015 the secondary sector (industry and construction) had 27 establishments and employed 169 employees.

The main employer in the town is the Faissole biscuit factory which has produced biscuits and toasted buns since the 1960s and employs 118 employees with an annual turnover of €11 million. The agri-food sector also has the Rigault and Co. factory for cured meats with 18 employees.

A small central hydroelectric plant is installed on the Vaïre near Scaffarels. The water chute is 46 m high and drives a turbine of 820 kW. Production is currently halted from July to October. The plant is equipped with a fish slide.

At the end of 2015 the tertiary sector (trades and services) had 87 establishments with 48 employees plus another 25 administrative establishments employing 86 people.

According to Departmental Observatory of Tourism, the tourist function is important for the town, with between 1 and 5 tourists welcomed per year per inhabitant. Most of the accommodation capacity is non-market. Several tourist accommodation structures exist in the commune:

- several hotels (1 classified 1-star and 2 classified 2-star). These three hotels have a total capacity of 33 rooms;
- a 2-star camping site with 64 places; *several furnished units;
- collective accommodation is provided by a vacation village managed by the commune and a cottage (The Roncharels).

Overall, second homes add a significant extra accommodation capacity in the commune with 334 homes (35% of the houses in the town).

In summer, the passage of the steam train on the line from Nice to Digne between Puget-Théniers and Annot adds significant tourist activity to the commune. In 2006-2007 this increased the patronage on the line by 50 to 60%.

An Equestrian Centre is located in the commune.

== Tourism ==
Annot is well regarded for bouldering and is particularly popular among climbers, as the second biggest developed area of that kind in France.

== Culture and heritage ==
=== Civil heritage ===
- The Pont de la Donne (Bridge over the Donne) (1709). is registered as an historical monument. It is partly in the commune of Saint-Benoît.
- The Old town and medieval alleys. A lintel bears the date of 1377 which is apocryphal according to Raymond Collier as it is contrary to other lintels dated 1455 and 1533
- The Bridge over the Beite and its surroundings
- The Arcade Houses in the arcade on the Rue Notre Dame
- A Fortified Gate in the old town;
- The Place of plane trees along the Vaïre
- A Coaching Inn in Rouaine which is still used as a hotel-restaurant.
- A Fountain with the inscription RF 1894
- The Hôtel-Dieu from the 17th century
- The Town hall from the 17th century

Views of Annot town.

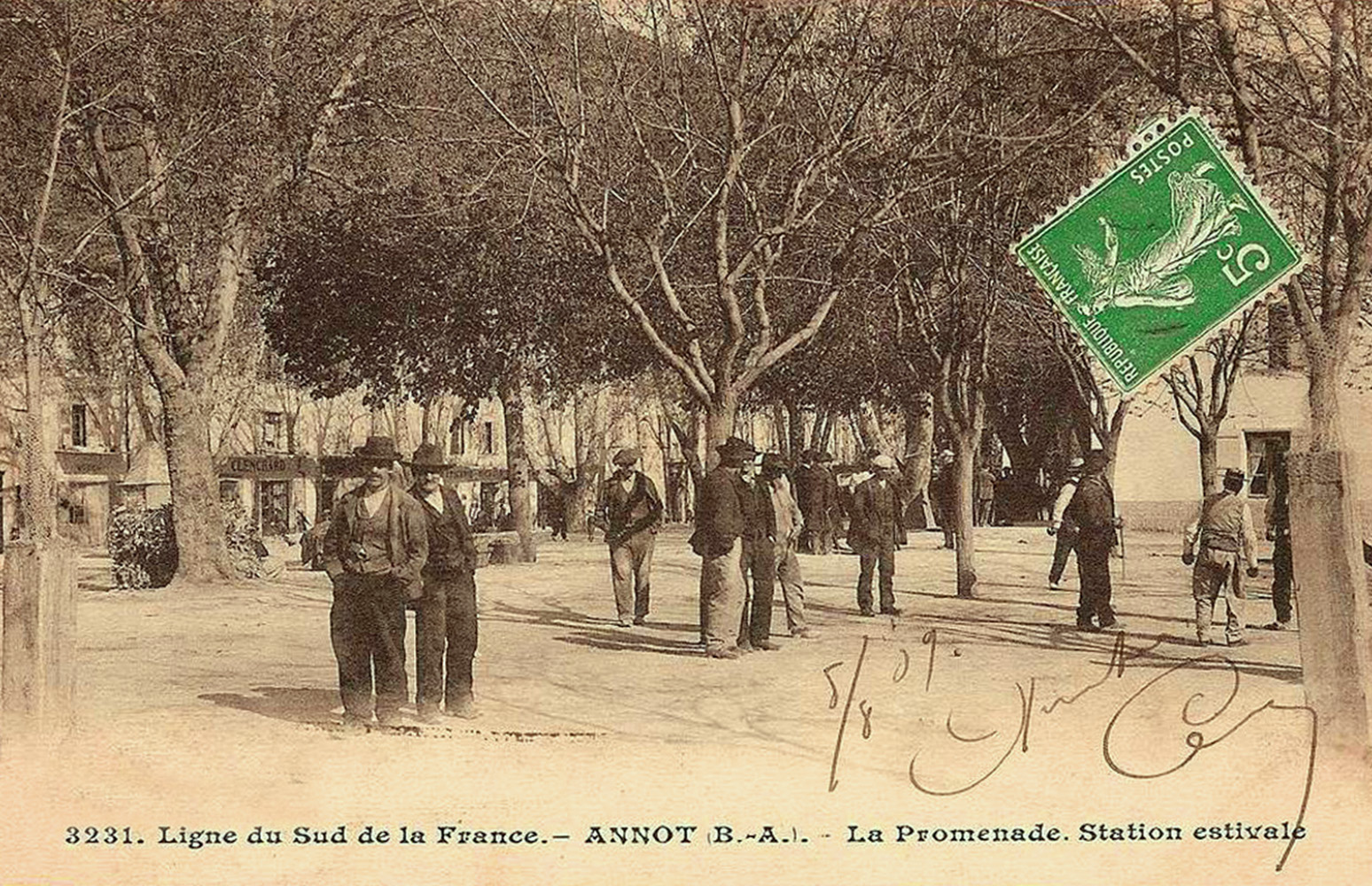
Jeu Provençal on the Place of Plane Trees in 1909.

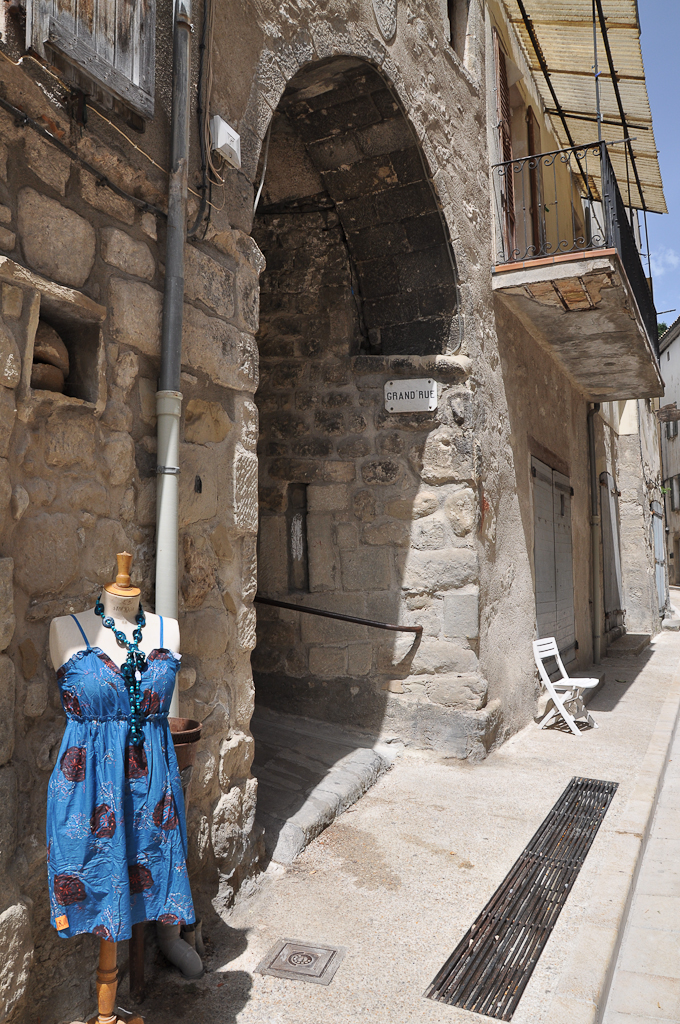
The Fortified Gate.

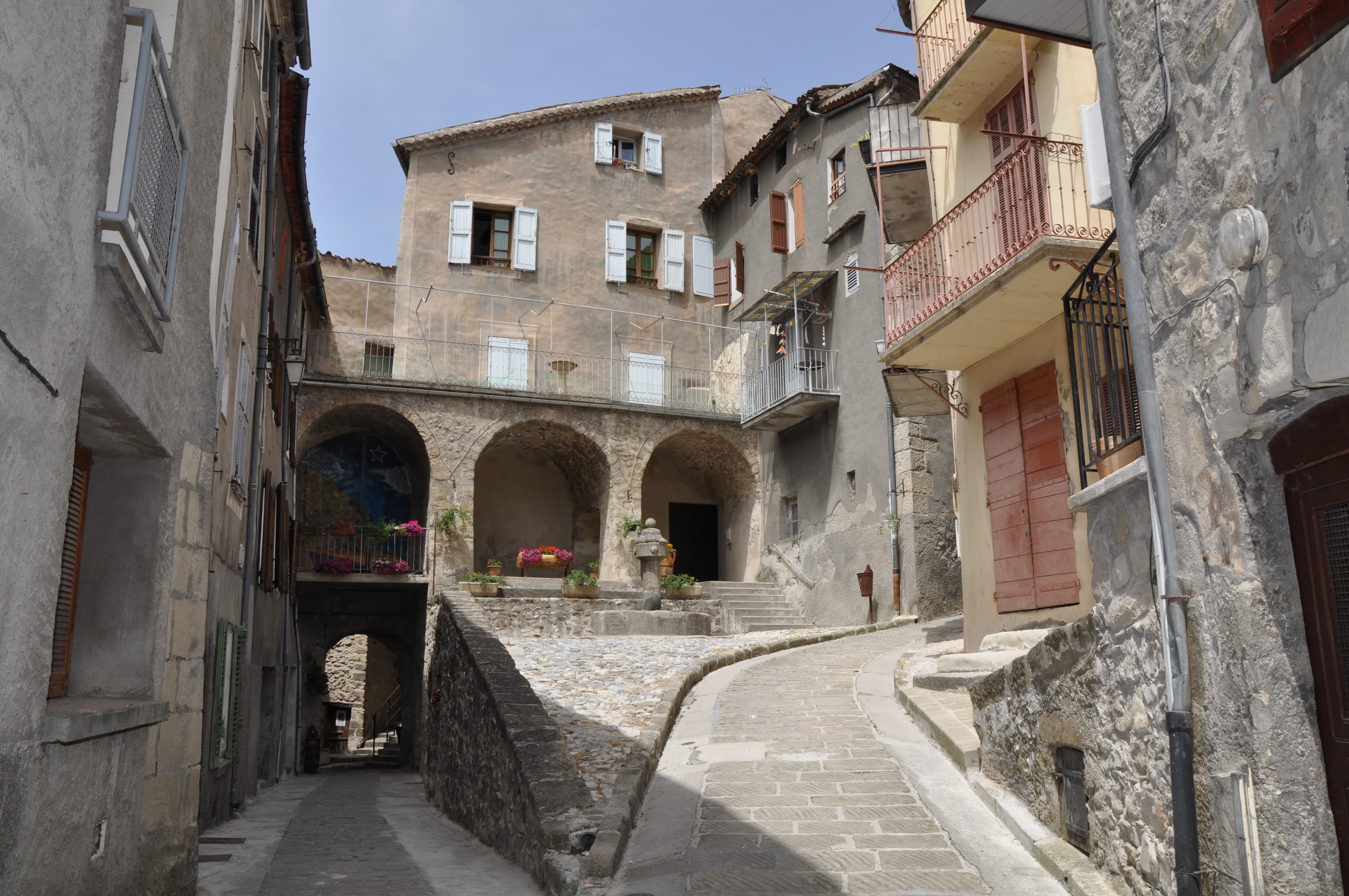
Houses in the arcades.

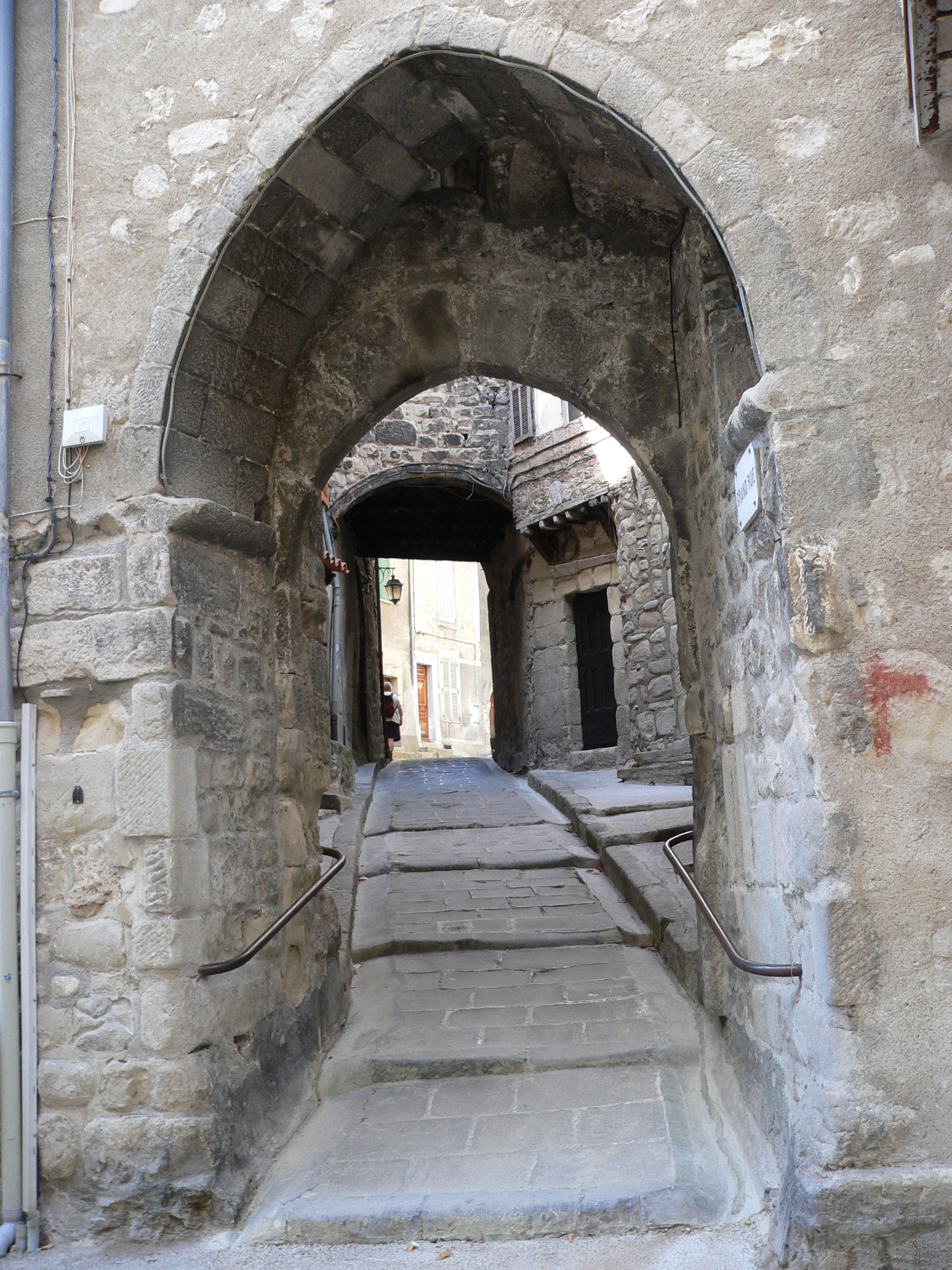
A medieval lane

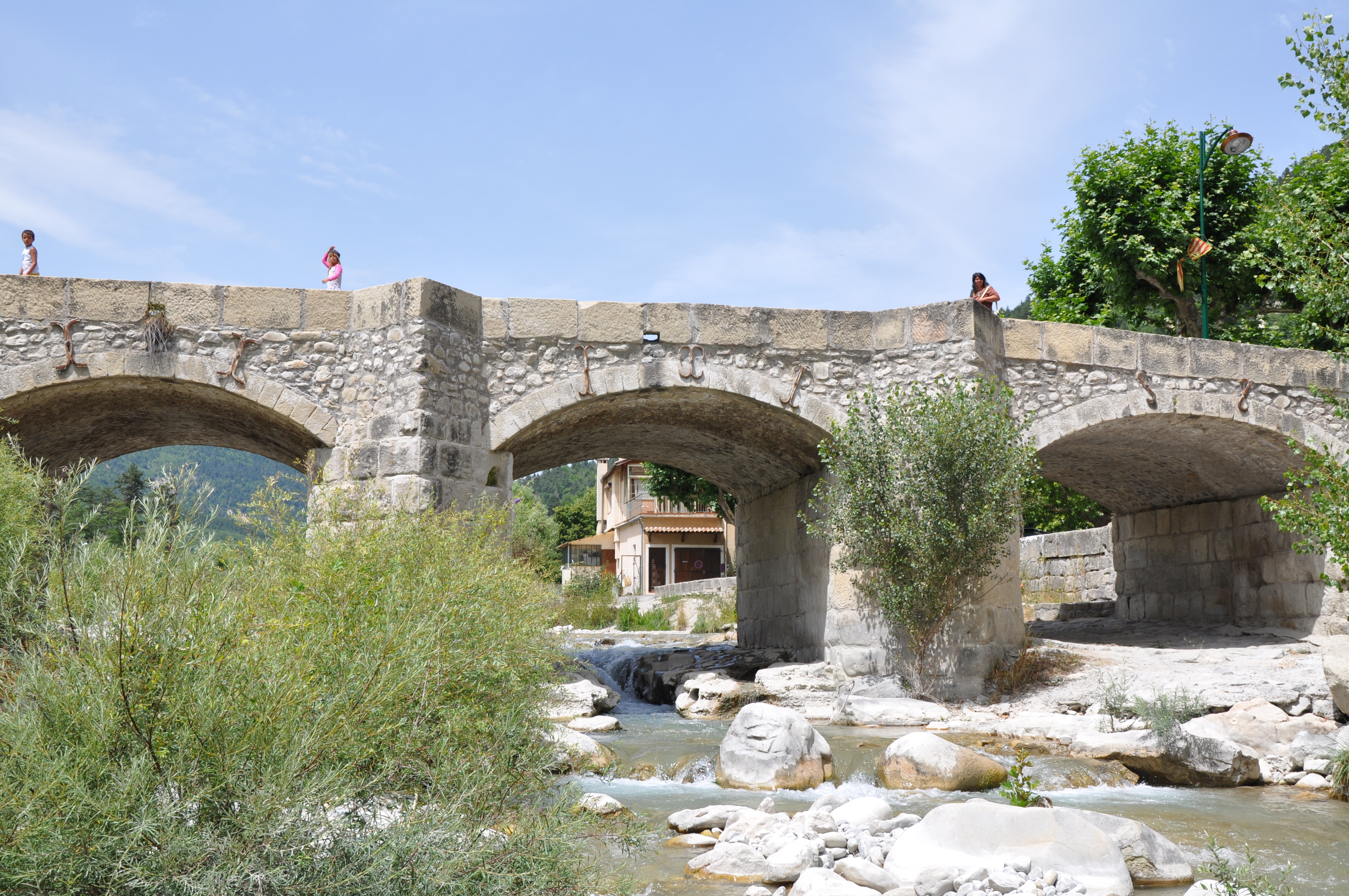
Bridge over the Vaïre

- The Bridge over the Vaïre is 34 metres long and 3.5 metres wide. It succeeded another bridge built in 1676. The community of Annot first built it with stone piers by the master masons François Richard, Louis Borrely, and Louis Fabre. These piers are protected by strong front and rear Starlings with handrails provided on top of the starlings. On these piles a wooden deck was built which allowed rapid commissioning in 1682. The wooden deck was replaced by a stone deck at the beginning of the 18th century. It was the object of repair works in 1777. In 1932 the square in the village was enlarged and the two main arches were sealed.

=== Religious heritage ===
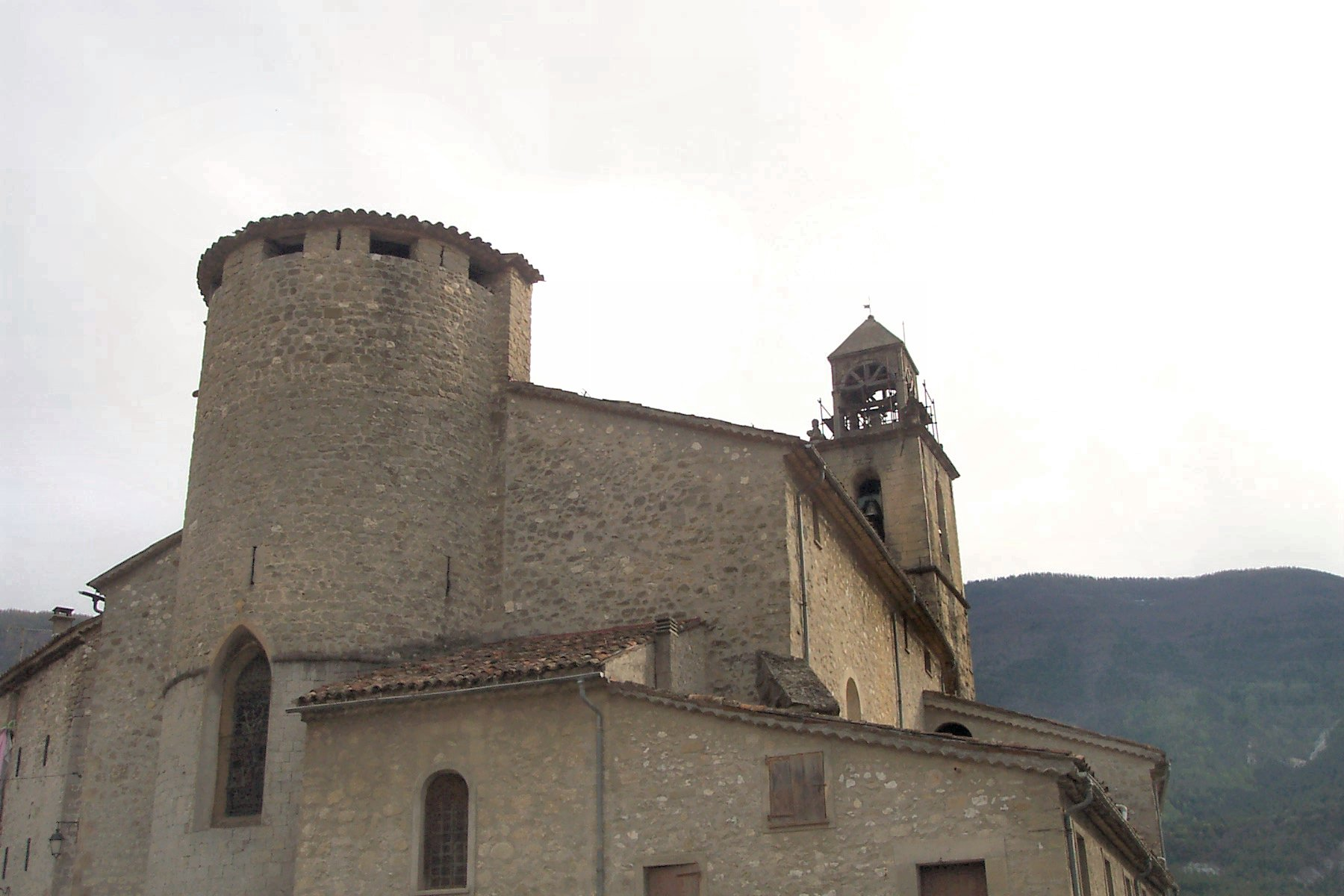
The parish church of Saint John the Baptist

The commune has several religious buildings and structures that are registered as historical monuments:

- The Parish Church of Saint John the Baptist (12th century) (formerly Saint-Pons) is in the old town. Initially a simple priory, it took on the function of a parish church at the time of the constitution of castrum in the late 12th century. It was built with a semi-circular apse, a semi-circular vault which is the only part of the church which is entirely Romanesque. It is extended by a hemispherical tower. An aisle was added or rebuilt in the 15th or 16th centuries in the Gothic style. The nave was rebuilt in the 17th century. The church has a very large number of items which have been registered as historical objects. Some of these objects are:
  - A Monstrance (19th century)
  - A Chalice (19th century)
  - A Ciborium (19th century)
  - A Statue: Saint Antoine (18th century)
  - A Bust-Reliquary: Saint Peter (18th century)
  - A Framed Painting: Baptism of Christ (18th century)
  - A Statue: Saint Joseph (1863)
  - A Statue: Saint John the Baptist (1862)
  - A Statue: Saint Fortunat (1861)
  - A Celebrant Chair (19th century)
- A Covered Wayside Cross (10th century) or oratory near Route nationale N202.
- The Chapel of Notre-Dame-de-Vers-la-Ville (12th century) was built on a small platform in front of a sandstone pile of rocks. Probably installed in the centre of a Carolingian field, it served as a parish church until the end of the 12th century. It contains many items that are registered as historical objects:
  - 2 Statuettes: Cherubs holding candles (18th century)
  - A Monstrance (19th century)
  - A Painting: Portrait of Christ (19th century)
  - A Retable and Painting: Virgin and child (18th century)
  - A Painting: Virgin of Suffering (18th century)
  - A Painting: Ecce homo (18th century)
  - A Painting: Ecce homo (2) (19th century)
  - A Statue: Virgin and child (18th century)
  - A Painting: Ex-voto (18th century)
  - All furniture in the Church (19th-20th century)
  - A Painting Ex-voto: Virgin and child (18th century)
  - A Painting: Christ between two thieves (1859)
  - 2 Statuettes: Angels with torches (18th century)
  - A Statue-Reliquary: Virgin and child (18th century)
  - A Walnut Frame (17th century)
  - A Painting: Annunciation (1656)
- The Parish Church of Saint Peter (17th century) The Church has a very large number of items that are registered as historical objects.

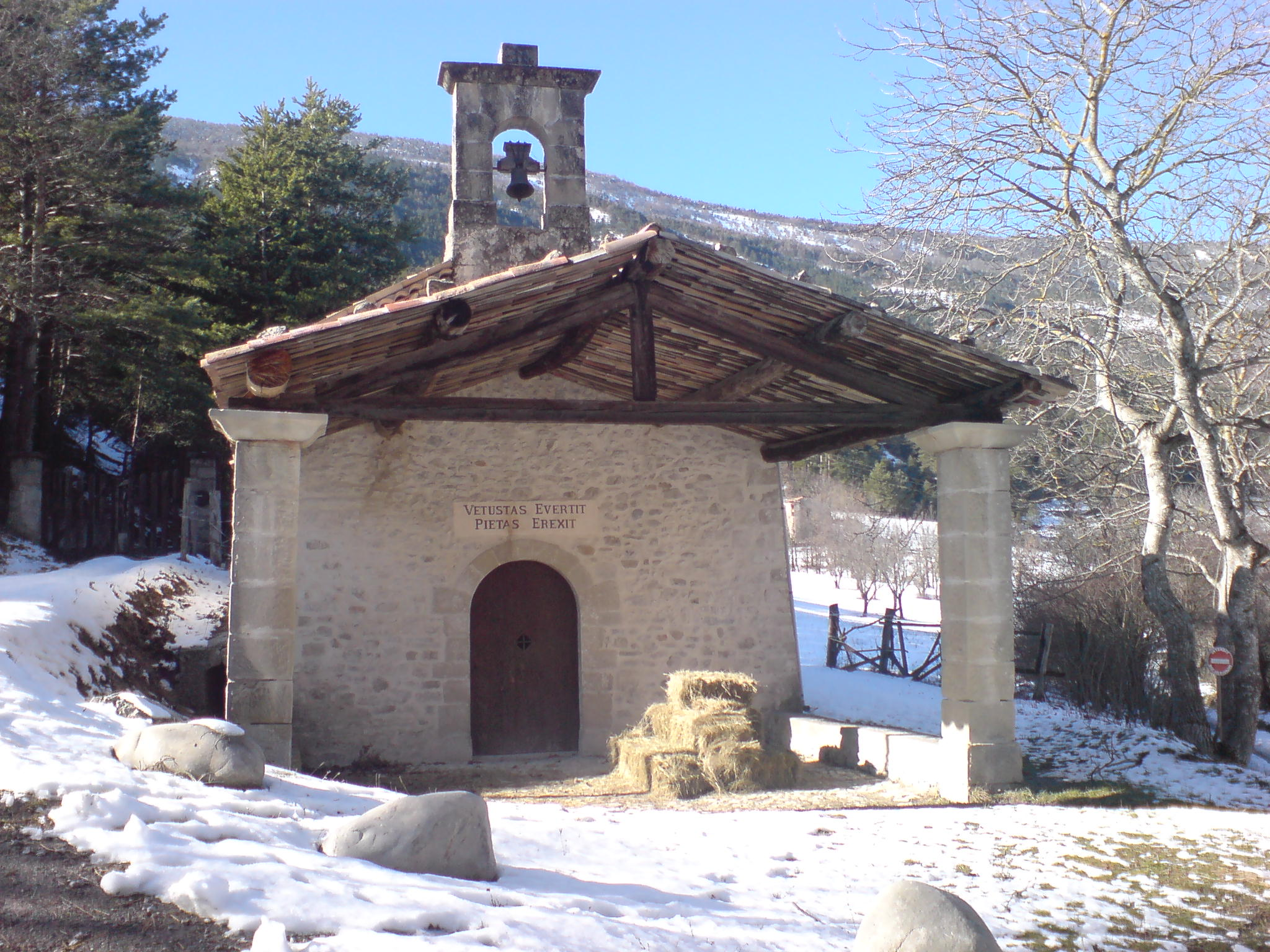
Chapel of Vérimande.

- The Chapel of Notre-Dame-de-Vérimande (17th century) The Chapel existed before the 13th century. It was then probably rebuilt in the second half of the 17th century and restored significantly in the mid-18th century then again at the end of the 19th century. It has a canopy, and Lunettes over the Bays. The Chapel contains many items that are registered as historical objects:
  - A Statue: Saint Mary-Magdalene (18th century)
  - A Statue: Saint Anne (18th century)
  - A Bust-Reliquary: Saint Fortunat (18th century)
  - A Painting: Saints Martin and Pons with the Virgin (17th century)
  - A Painting: Saints Prosper, Fortunat, Innocent, and Sécure (1677)
  - A Bronze Bell (1652)
  - The Furniture in the chapel (20th century)
- The Chapel of White Penitents contains several items that are registered as historical objects:
  - A Painting: Placing in the Tomb (17th century)
  - A Painting: Saint Famille (17th century)
  - A Bust-Reliquary: Saint Clair (18th century)
  - A Bust-Reliquary: Saint Blaise (18th century)
  - A Painting: Virgin and child (18th century)
  - A Retable and Painting: Descent from the Cross with the white penitents and Louis XIII (1641)
  - A Statue: Virgin and child (18th century)
  - A Statue: Virgin and child (18th century)
- The Church of Saint-Pierre-aux-Liens (17th century) at Rouaine was the parish church there.
- The Chapel of Sainte-Anne at Rouaine.

=== Environmental heritage ===
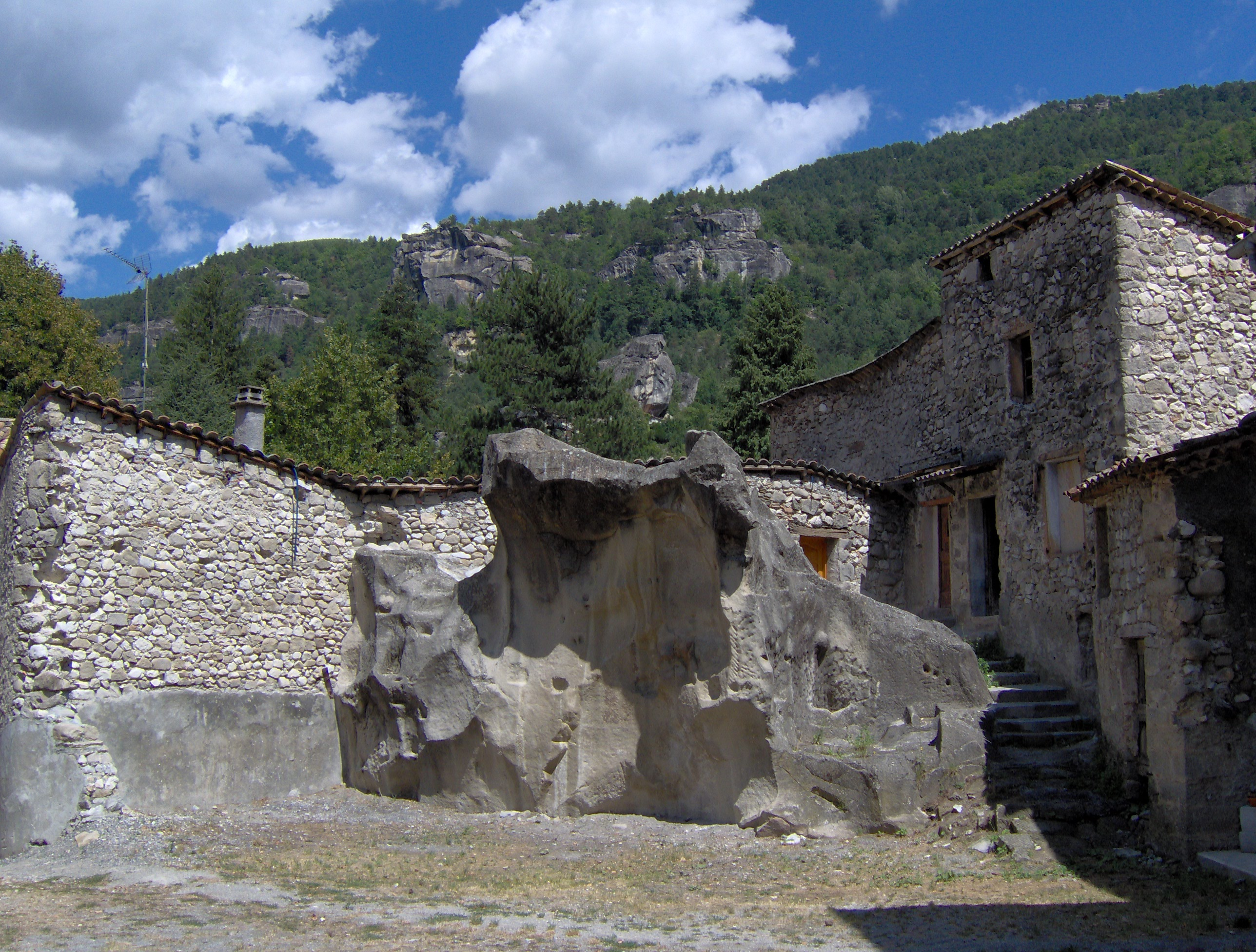
Annot Sandstone

- The Grès d'Annot (Annot Sandstone), a chaos of sandstone blocks nationally known by climbers who practice climbing. They are a listed site in the Regional Directorate of the Environment and protected since 1946. They cover an area of 137 hectares in total.
- The Gorge of the Galange is crossed by Route nationale N202 on the vertiginous bridge of Saint-Joseph (753 m high)
- The Defile of Garambes

=== Military heritage ===
The Medieval Ramparts are still partly visible, doors have been conserved and provide access to the old village. Tall houses surrounding the town formed the outer wall and marked the outline of the medieval city. At Vérimande there is Templar Chapel and a house said to be from the Templars: a large structure with a tower Dovecote.

== Notable people linked to the commune ==
- Jacques Verdollin (born 29 November 1738 in Annot and died on 16 April 1793 in Paris), deputy in the States General of 1789 and the National Convention in September 1792.
- Paul Rabiers du Villars (born 2 June 1837 in Annot and died 11 May 1898 at Castellane) was elected in 1877, he saw his election invalidated.
- Marsi Paribatra (born 25 August 1931 in Bangkok, Thailand and died on 9 July 2013 at her house in Annot), was the only daughter of Prince Chumbhot Paripatra, Prince of Nakhon Sawan (Thailand). Her style was Mom Chao Ying (HSH). She was also an artist who exhibited regularly in Paris at the Musée d’Art Moderne between 1964 and 1972.

== Bibliography ==
- Raymond Collier, Upper-Provence Monumental and Artistic, Digne, Imprimerie Louis Jean, 1986, 559 p. (in French)
- Under the direction of Édouard Baratier, Georges Duby, and Ernest Hildesheimer, Historical Atlas of Provence, Comtat Venaissin, Principality of Orange, County of Nice, Principality of Monaco, Librairie Armand Colin, Paris, 1969 (in French)
- Jean-Louis Damon, Au pied du Baou Sublime. Nouvelles historiques et récits du pays d'Annot, Serre éditeur (collection les régionales), Nice, 1990 ISBN 978-2-86410-149-9 ; p. 180 (in French)

== See also ==
- Communes of the Alpes-de-Haute-Provence department
