= Thomas family murders =

2014 murders in France

- Location: Grande-Synthe, France
- Date: 4 August 2014
- Attack type: Mass murder
- Weapon: Gun
- Deaths: 3
- Victims: Isabelle Thomas (aged 49); Marguerite Thomas (aged 68); Roland Thomas (aged 72)
- Perpetrator: Patrick Lemoine
- Motive: Jealousy
- Charges: Femicide

A triple homicide occurred on 4 August 2014 in Grande-Synthe, France. Patrick Lemoine shot dead his former partner Isabelle Thomas and both her parents following a car chase through the streets of Grande-Synthe; the perpetrator committed suicide two months later while in custody. Lemoine had attempted to strangle Thomas the previous June, and following this had repeatedly violated his judicial supervision. On multiple occasions Thomas had alerted the public prosecutor's office and the local police in June and July 2014, who merely issued a summons. In 2020, the French state was found guilty of gross negligence in a high-profile legal case. The crime, which included a femicide, was described as a "death foretold".

== Background ==
Isabelle Thomas was a 49-year-old mathematics teacher. Patrick Lemoine worked as an auto-repair technician. In the summer of 2012, Thomas and Lemoine met and began a relationship. In 2013, she had moved in with him in Vieux-Condé but they soon separated.

In June 2014, Isabelle Thomas filed a complaint for attempted homicide after her ex-partner, Patrick Lemoine, tried to strangle her after beating her. She described the psychological abuse and coercive control she had previously suffered. The complaint was quickly reclassified as a case of simple domestic violence. Having admitted to his actions while justifying them, he was placed under judicial supervision the following day, prohibited from contacting his victim, pending his trial, which was scheduled for August 2014.

In July 2014, Isabelle Thomas, who had received numerous text messages from her former partner and had been approached and threatened by him, alerted the police. She visited police stations on four occasions, including filing a complaint for breach of judicial supervision in Valenciennes on 10 July, and then filed a report in Lille on 23 July, after being chased in her car and receiving further threats. Her lawyer contacted the Public Prosecutor's Office to inform them.

== Murders ==
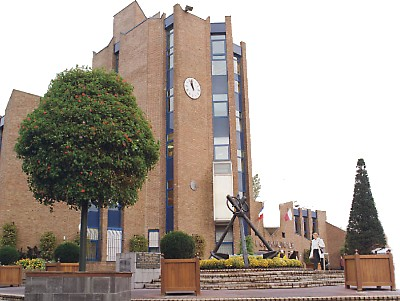
Grande Synthe Town Hall

On 4 August 2014, Isabelle Thomas made an emergency call to the police. She reported that she and her parents had been chased by Patrick Lemoine, who had blocked their car in a parking lot and shot her mother. They had been accosted in the market square car park in Grande-Synthe. The phone call to the police lasted more than five minutes, at the end of which Patrick Lemoine had shot and killed the three occupants of the Peugeot 407. The confirmed deaths were of Isabelle Thomas and her parents, Marguerite and Roland Thomas, aged 68 and 72 respectively. He justified his actions saying that he couldn't cope with the breakup with his ex-girlfriend.

== Discharge of legal proceedings ==
After the triple murder, Patrick Lemoine fled to Belgium and attempted suicide. He was arrested by Belgian police and was imprisoned in Saint-Gilles Prison. Extradited a few days later, he took his own life in Lille prison in October 2014, thus ending the legal proceedings. A year later, the family was informed that the murder of their parents had been reclassified as single murder. The victims' sister and daughter Cathy Thomas launched a petition in 2016 to draw attention to the state's shortcomings, and then decided to file a lawsuit. She denounced the inaction of the social services and the failure to prevent the killings. In November 2018, she unveiled a memorial stone to commemorate victims of domestic violence. With her lawyer, Cathy Thomas successfully argued for the reclassification of the three murders as a triple murder.

Justice Minister Nicole Belloubet requested an inspection to review the role of the state in femicide cases closed since 2015.

== Lawsuit against the French State ==
On 11 July 2019, Cathy Thomas's lawyer, Maître Steyer, announced at a press conference that a complaint had been filed, recounting the "chronicle of a death foretold". During the trial in February 2020, three charges of gross negligence were argued: the implementation of judicial supervision, deemed inappropriate; inaction in the face of repeated violations of judicial supervision; and the "shortcomings" of the police services, who were called on the day of the murder. The lawyer argued that "the danger was not taken into account," since there were no restraining orders, nor any strengthening or revocation of his judicial supervision, despite a series of "warning signs." The state representative maintained that "the public justice system did not malfunction" and dismissed Cathy Thomas's case. In its judgment, the Tribunal de Paris upheld only the second charge. It ordered the French state to pay €100,000 in damages, justifying its judgment of gross negligence as follows: “Although it has not been demonstrated that a faster investigation could have altered the course of events, […] the police services did not, in fact, do everything possible to find the perpetrator, and this culpable negligence led to the loss of an opportunity to have the judicial supervision revoked. […] This fault on the part of the police services thus put Patrick Lemoine in a position to commit the three murders”.

Recognizing gross negligence, the court ordered the State to pay €75,000 in compensation for the emotional distress suffered by Cathy Thomas and to also pay €25,000 to the victims' nephew and grandson.
