= Christophe Guilluy =

French geographer and author (born 1964)

Christophe Guilluy (French pronunciation: [gilɥi], born 14 October 1964 in Montreuil, Seine-Saint-Denis) is a French geographer and author.

He is known for his theory on "peripheral France" (French: la France périphérique), laid out in the 2014 book La France périphérique, which refers to mainly rural areas of France where many members of the political elite have lost contact with working-class people. He has used that theory to explain the rise of the far-right National Front in the country.

He also theorised the reason for American support of Donald Trump by the existence of a peripheral America during an interview in the French magazine Le Point.

== Works ==
- Guilluy, Christophe (2000): Atlas de fractures françaises. Paris, Éditions L'Harmattan ISBN 978-2738493910
- Guilluy, Christophe (2004) Atlas des nouvelles fractures sociales en France. Paris, Éditions Autrement, re-issued in 2006 ISBN 978-2746708228
- Guilluy, Christophe (2013): Fractures françaises. Paris, Flammarion – Champs essais ISBN 978-2-0812-8961-1
- Guilluy, Christophe (2009): L'Annuel des idées 2009. Paris, Bourin Éditeur ISBN 978-2849411148
- Guilluy, Christophe (2011): Plaidoyer pour une gauche populaire. Lormont, Éditions Le Bord de l'eau ISBN 978-2356871404
- Guilluy Christophe (2014): La France périphérique: Comment on a sacrifié les classes populaires. Paris, Flammarion ISBN 978-2-08-131257-9
- Guilluy, Christophe (2016): Le Crépuscule de la France d’en Haut. Paris, Flammarion, ISBN 978-2-0813-7534-5
- Guilluy, Christophe (2018): No Society. La fin de la classe moyenne occidentale. Paris, Flammarion, ISBN 978-2-0814-2271-1
- Guilluy, Christophe (2020): Le temps des gens ordinaires. Paris, Flammarion, ISBN 978-2-0815-1229-0
- Guilluy, Christophe and Mokritzky, Sacha (2022) Dialogue périphérique. Paris, Éditions du Zinc. ISBN 9782380740127
- Guilluy, Christophe (2022): Les dépossédés, L'instinct de survie des classes populaires. Paris, Flammarion. ISBN 2080290134
