= Christophe Laigneau =

French footballer (1965–2011)

Personal information
- Date of birth: 11 January 1965
- Place of birth: Clichy-sous-Bois, France
- Date of death: 23 December 2011 (aged 46)
- Place of death: Troyes, France
- Position: Midfielder

Senior career*
Years	Team	Apps	(Gls)
1984–1986	Laval	5	(0)
1986–1987	Chaumont		
1987–1988	Maubeuge		
1988–1989	Le Puy	18	(1)
1989–1995	Troyes	147	(8)
Total		170	(9)
- * Club domestic league appearances and goals

Christophe Laigneau (11 January 1965 – 23 December 2011) was a French professional footballer who played as a midfielder.

== Career ==
Born in Clichy-sous-Bois, Laigneau played for Laval, Chaumont, Maubeuge, Le Puy and Troyes.

== Death ==
Laigneau died on 23 December 2011, at the age of 46.
