= Cizia Zykë =

French writer and adventurer

- Born: Jean-Charles Zykë; 25 February 1949; Taroudannt, French Morocco
- Died: 27 September 2011 (aged 62); Bordeaux, France
- Occupations: Novelist, adventurer, explorer

Cizia Zykë (born Jean-Charles Zykë; 25 February 1949 – 27 September 2011) was a French writer and adventurer born in Morocco. He wrote numerous books on exploring dangerous corners of the world.

== Biography ==
Born to a French-Albanian ex-legionnaire father and a Greek mother, he was raised in Taroudannt until Morocco gained independence in 1956 when they all left for Bordeaux. His teenage years are marked with rebellion and violence - he was arrested twice. As a 17-year-old he tried to leave France, but being unable to obtain a passport he joined the Foreign Legion to fight during the Six-Day War. After three months, before he could leave France, his unit was disbanded.

In 1967 he finally left France and traveled to his distant family in Argentina. In three years he earned quite a sum of money trading in Pre-Columbian art and gambling. He worked various jobs (became the owner of a night club in Buenos Aires, a sculptor and interior decorator in Ecuador, bootlegger and archeologist in Argentina).

From South America, he traveled to the United States and Asia, living in Los Angeles, Hong Kong, and Bangkok. In 1971, he arrived in Toronto, and set up various money making schemes (clandestine games, racketeering, etc.), which at one point led him to be severely beaten by a rival gang of professional racketeers. As his life was in danger in Toronto, he moved on to new perilous adventures. He first went to North Africa, where he eventually got arrested in Bamako, Mali, for his often illegal transactions as a used car dealer. Later, after the death of his one-year-old son, born in 1978, he ended up in Costa Rica, where he found a legal gold mining holding.

His first published book, Oro, which earned him international attention, narrates his adventures searching for gold in Costa Rica. He then wrote Sahara, describing his previous adventures in Africa, and Parodie, dealing with his life in Toronto. He then went on to write fiction books.

Cizia Zykë died of a heart attack in Bordeaux, on 27 September 2011.

== Partial bibliography ==
- Oro (ISBN 83-11-07706-1)
- Sahara (ISBN 83-11-07838-6)
- Parodie (ISBN 83-11-07898-X)
- Fièvres (ISBN 83-11-07952-8)
- Tuan (ISBN 978-83-925934-0-9)
