= Do Not Look at the Sun =

French literary magazine

- Website type: Consumer
- Available in: English
- Creator: Anthony Cuthbertson
- Website: donotlookatthesun.com
- Launched: April 2009
- Current status: Online

Do Not Look at the Sun is a literary magazine, which was set up as donotlookatthesun.com in April 2009 and is edited from Paris. Its editor-in-chief since inception has been Anthony Cuthbertson.

The idea behind Do Not Look at the Sun is 'found poetry, free prose'. It features poetry, prose, and what it refers to as 'misfit lit'. Poets & Writers described the content as 'notes, thoughts, one-line poems, streams of thought and lucid dreams, and other words that have no place elsewhere.'

== History ==
The magazine was launched in 2009 in Paris. It is published both in print and online on a biannual basis. Each issue is distributed in a different form that fits with their 'found poetry, free prose' ethos. Previous forms have included postcards, paper planes and street art. It is distributed by a growing network of volunteers from locations that include New Delhi, Sydney, Johannesburg, and New York City.

== Contributors ==
Notable contributors to date include Sage Francis, Ben Myers, Kele Okereke, Tony O'Neill, Simon Perchik, and Scroobius Pip.

== See also ==
- List of literary magazines
