= International Institute of Nuclear Energy =

French government initiative

I2EN
- International institute of nuclear energy
- I2ENLOGO
- Type: Training
- Established: 2010
- Location: Paris, France
- Website: http://www.i2en.fr/en/

The International Institute of Nuclear Energy (I2EN) is a French government initiative to bring together the leading universities and engineering schools to contribute to responsible development of nuclear energy. The institute's partners with research organizations and companies in the French nuclear energy domain. Its worldwide dimension makes I2EN a source of solutions in educating and training for development of human resources in nuclear energy.

The core purpose of I2EN is to establish a responsible approach to the management of safety for a sustainable nuclear industry.

== Mission ==
The Institute's aim is to provide solutions for education and training to contribute to responsible development of nuclear energy. Training requests from governments, institutions, industry bodies or from individual students are received and analyzed and responses tailored to the specific needs identified. I2EN defines the standard of nuclear training for the French Ministry of Higher Education in the respect of the international standards established. The I2EN has an agreement with the UK National Skills Academy for Nuclear. Being a part of an international network, the I2EN leads seminars and professional scientific or sociological forums. These are meant to support a vision of a sustainable development of nuclear energy.

== Key dates ==
- June 2011: Official inauguration
- September 2010: Opening of the Institute. The first classes are given.
- June 2010: A report is made to Valérie Pécresse (Minister of High Education & Research) and Jean-Louis Borloo (Minister of Ecology, Energy, Sustainable development and Sea affairs) by Catherine Cesarsky, High commissioner of atomic energy.
- March 2010: French President of the Republic, Nicolas Sarkozy, announces the establishment of the International institute of nuclear energy “that will house an international school of nuclear”. He expressed its commitment in assisting countries wishing to develop a nuclear program in the respect of safety, security, non-proliferation and respect of the environment.
- October 2008: Minister of Higher Education and Research set up the Nuclear Energy Training Council (CFEN).

== I2EN's 24 partners in June 2011 ==
Catherine Cesarsky, High commissioner of atomic energy, presiding over the Council of Partners, these institutions ratified the agreement related to the I2EN. A second Council, gathering new potential partners, will be given in 2012.
