= La France périphérique =

2014 book by Christophe Guilluy

- Author: Christophe Guilluy
- Language: French
- Publisher: Flammarion
- Publication date: 17 September 2014
- Publication place: France
- Pages: 192
- ISBN: 978-2-08-131257-9

La France périphérique: comment on a sacrifié les classes populaires (transl. Peripheral France: How the Popular Classes Were Sacrificed) is a 2014 book by the French writer Christophe Guilluy. It analyses increasing polarisation between popular sentiment and rulers in France.

The term "peripheral France" made an impact in France's public discourse and continued to be used in relation to phenomena such as the yellow vests protests.
