= French Student and Workers Strike against Austerity 2009 =

General strike

This action marked the first general strike in an industrialized nation since the 2008 financial crisis. French students became frustrated by a lack of government support to workers, as well as high youth unemployment and low funding for education. Sit-ins, strikes, and other demonstrations were organized in opposition to the proposed austerity measures.

== Causes ==
There were a number of possible French responses to the economic crisis. Nicolas Sarkozy, the President at the time, implemented a multifaceted response involving a large stimulus package in some sectors and austerity measures in others. Predictions of further economic downturn led to a $34 billion stimulus plan, $11 billion of which were bound for banks. Meanwhile, public sector jobs were cut, especially in educational positions.

Unemployment rates climbed steadily, up to almost 5 million in 2013. The main population affected was under 25 year olds and seniors.

== Involved Parties ==
Students, as well as eight major unions came together to call for a general strike. The strikers’ demands focused on a change; they believed the stimulus should be centered around job-protection and purchasing power for consumers.

== Events ==
=== General Strike ===
A one-day general strike was held on January 29, with between 1.1 and 2.5 million people participating. Although generally peaceful, a small clash led to the arrest of 100 youth. Due to public pressure, Sarkozy agreed to meet with union leaders to plan a reform to the stimulus package. $3.2 billion was added to the plan and it extended to unemployment benefits and tax breaks for the poor.

=== Other Actions ===
The end of the general strike did not bring an end to the unrest. Demonstrations, blockades, and strikes were held across the country by university students and faculty for months. Another general strike was organized for March 19 of 2009, specifically calling for assistance for workers, an end to tax breaks for businesses and the wealthy, and an end to cuts of public sector jobs. This strike drew an even larger number of people, with estimates ranging between 1.2 and 3 million.

== Political Changes ==
Although these strikes would not gain much in the way of concessions from Sarkozy, they did much to contribute to his disapproval rating. In 2012 Sarkozy would lose the election to François Hollande, who ran on an anti-austerity platform.

== See also ==
- François Hollande presidential campaign, 2012
- 2012 French presidential election
