= 2010 Martiniquean status referendum =

- 10 January 2010
- Do you approve of the transformation of Martinique into an overseas collectivity governed by article 74 of the Constitution, endowed with a particular organization taking into account its own interests within the Republic?

Results
Choice	Votes	%
Yes	32,954	20.69%
No	126,298	79.31%
Valid votes	159,252	96.99%
Invalid or blank votes	4,946	3.01%
Total votes	164,198	100.00%
Registered voters/turnout	296,802	55.32%

A referendum on becoming an overseas territory was held in Martinique on 10 January 2010. The proposal was rejected by 79% of voters, with a turnout of 55%. A simultaneous referendum was rejected in French Guiana.

== Background ==
French President Nicolas Sarkozy proposed the referendum after visiting the Caribbean island of Martinique in June 2009. The French overseas departments of Martinique and Guadeloupe had suffered prolonged general strikes in early 2009, due to low wages and standards of living. The rationale for holding a referendum on Martinique's status came about after protests in 2009 about growing unemployment and inflation throughout the French Caribbean, leading to the French government to hold negotiations with the local Martiniqueans government about their status within Overseas France.

Martiniquean voters were asked whether they wanted more power to be given to the local government based in Fort-de-France. Martinique was an overseas region and an overseas department of France, regulated by the article 73 of the French Constitution, giving it the same political status as metropolitan departments and regions. The proposed change would have led to it becoming an overseas collectivity, regulated by the article 74 of the French Constitution, similar to French Polynesia.

== Results ==
Choice	Votes	%
For	32,954	20.69
Against	126,298	79.31
Total	159,252	100.00
Valid votes	159,252	96.99
Invalid/blank votes	4,946	3.01
Total votes	164,198	100.00
Registered voters/turnout	296,802	55.32
Source: Direct Democracy

== Aftermath ==
79% of Mariniqueans who voted rejected the option for more autonomy. After the vote, President Sarkosy said that the result would "close the debate" on more autonomy for Martinique "for a long time". This came after "No" voters had claimed that more autonomy would lead to a drop in payments of French social benefits. Senator Claude Lise, who backed the autonomy vote, stated "this was a vote of panic".
