= Murder of Fiona Chafoulais =

2013 child murder in France

- Location: France
- Date: c. 12 May 2013
- Attack type: infanticide
- Perpetrators: Cécile Bourgeon; Berkane Makhlouf

The murder of Fiona Chafoulais, known as the Affaire Fiona (in English: "Fiona Case"), was a crime committed in France in 2013. The 5-year-old Chafoulais was beaten to death by her mother Cécile Bourgeon and her mother's companion Berkane Makhlouf. The girl's body was never found, as the accused did not remember the place of burial.

Following a fourth trial in December 2020 in Lyon, Cécile Bourgeon and Berkane Makhlouf were sentenced to 20 years and 18 years of imprisonment respectively.

== Context ==
Cécile Bourgeon, Fiona's mother, had a troubled childhood. Her parents divorced when she was five years old, and her school career was average. With her partner Nicolas Chafoulais, Fiona and Eva's father, she fell into drug addiction. After her breakup in 2011 with Nicolas Chafoulais, Cécile Bourgeon continued a chaotic life, between addiction and short-lived romantic relationships. She was raped by Adel Souissi on 5 May 2012, a year before the girl's disappearance. According to her lawyers, she "fell after this rape, particularly into pathological drug addiction" (heroin, cocaine and hashish). It was after this episode that she got into a relationship with Berkane Makhlouf, a man with a disorderly background, described by witnesses as violent, perverse and paranoid.

The latter, born to an Algerian father who died in his youth, is from Nevers. He grew up in a large family and his mother was ill and overwhelmed, which led Berkane to be taken into care and then to end up living on the street. He lived off drug trafficking, and known to the police for acts of violence and drug use, he was nicknamed "drug dump" in Clermont-Ferrand. He was also known for being jealous and possessive. He had a boy named Bilal with Cécile, born in August 2013, before their arrest.

== Sequence of events ==
The five-year-old girl was reported lost on 12 May 2013 by her mother in Clermont-Ferrand. Cécile Bourgeon and her companion made people believe on television that it was a kidnapping before admitting four months later that Fiona had been beaten to death before being buried. The girl's body was never found, as the accused did not remember the place of burial and some witnesses having seen Berkane throwing away a large garbage bag.

According to her mother's statements, Fiona suffered from nausea, vomiting and abdominal pain the day before her death. The forensic expert who testified at the trial favoured the hypothesis of death resulting from abdominal trauma, the second leading cause of death in cases of child abuse. Without, however, giving any details on the exact causes of death, she confirmed that "the child was a victim of abuse".

== Trials ==
=== First trial ===
In a first trial which took place on 26 November 2016, Cécile Bourgeon was acquitted on the merits of the case but was sentenced to five years in prison for failure to assist a person in danger, modification of and false reporting of a crime. Berkane Makhlouf was sentenced to 20 years in prison for voluntary violence resulting in death without the intention of causing it and failure to assist a person in danger. The prosecution appealed.

=== Second and third appeal trials ===
On 13 October 2017, Mr. Khanifar, Berkane Makhlouf's lawyer, was accused of witness tampering by lawyer Marie Grimaud, who represents the Innocence en Danger association as a civil party. Mr. Portejoie, Cécile Bourgeon's lawyer, and Mr. Khanifar decide to leave the hearing. This second trial is interrupted and the magistrates order an adjournment of the appeal trial for January 2018, after a request made by the defense.

On 11 February 2018, Cécile Bourgeon and her partner Berkane Makhlouf were both sentenced to 20 years of criminal imprisonment on appeal. They were found guilty of voluntary violence resulting in death without intent to cause death to a minor under 15 years of age, in a group, and by ascendant for Cécile Bourgeon, by person with parental authority for Berkane Makhlouf.

Fiona's father, Nicolas Chafoulais, expressed his relief at this court decision.

=== Appeal in cassation ===
The girl's mother and Berkane Makhlouf appealed to the Court of Cassation. Following a request for registration of forgery filed by two civil party associations, the appeal was referred to the Court of Cassation in February 2019. The defence appeal criticised possible friendly relations between the judge and the civil parties, which could endanger his impartiality, as well as the fact that, according to the hearing minutes, the defense had not been given the last word during a request for an adjournment and that the judge had subsequently not given reasons for the refusal of the adjournment; the civil parties, for their part, contested the veracity of the minutes used, hence their application for forgery. The issue in this appeal being that if the conviction on appeal were overturned, it is the conviction at first instance, lighter and already served, which would apply to the mother, meaning her immediate release to appear at a new trial.

On 20 February 2019, the Court of Cassation annulled the conviction of Cécile Bourgeon, who appeared free for her fourth trial, having already served the sentence pronounced at first instance.

=== Fourth trial ===
The fourth trial was postponed several times.

Originally planned in January 2020 at the Rhône Cour d'assises in Lyon, it was postponed for the first time due to the imminent birth of Cécile Bourgeon. In fact, she had a fourth child in February 2020with a former inmate with whom she corresponded during her detention.

The trial was postponed until the end of May 2020, but was postponed again following the confinement decided due to the COVID-19 pandemic in France.

The fourth trial was finally held from 1 to 16 December 2020, where the Assize Court sentenced Cécile Bourgeon to 20 years in prison and Berkane Makhlouf to 18 years in prison. The appeal against this sentence was declared inadmissible by the Court of Cassation, making the guilt and the sentences pronounced definitive.

== Television documentaries ==
- « Où est passée la petite Fiona ? » (premier reportage) dans « ... à Clermont-Ferrand » le 3 mars 2014 dans Crimes sur NRJ 12.
- « L'affaire de la petite Fiona : la mère au double visage » (premier reportage) le 28 octobre 2017 dans Criminal Chronicles sur TFX.
- « Affaire Fiona : les mensonges de la mère » le 15 janvier 2020 dans Enquêtes criminelles : le magazine des faits divers sur W9.
- « Affaire Fiona, calvaire à huis clos » Au bout de l'enquête, la fin du crime parfait ? le 4 février 2023 dans sur France 2.

== Radio documentaries ==
- « L'affaire Fiona » le 8 novembre 2016, « Affaire Fiona : le procès inachevé » le 28 novembre 2016 et « Fiona : le dernier procès ? » le 12 février 2018 dans L'Heure du crime de Jacques Pradel sur RTL.
- "L'affaire de la petite Fiona", le 23 novembre 2020, dans L'Heure du crime de Jean-Alphonse Richard sur RTL.

== Literature ==
- Dalie Farah, Retrouver Fiona, Paris, Éditions Grasset, 2023, 288 p. ISBN 978-2-7547-3596-4.

== See also ==
- Affaire Typhaine Taton
- Affaire Marina Sabatier
