= 2010 French Guianan status referendum =

- 10 January 2010
- Do you approve of the transformation of Guyana into an overseas collectivity governed by Article 74 of the Constitution, endowed with a particular organization taking into account its own interests within the Republic?

Results
Choice	Votes	%
Yes	9,448	29.78%
No	22,281	70.22%
Valid votes	31,729	97.67%
Invalid or blank votes	757	2.33%
Total votes	32,486	100.00%
Registered voters/turnout	67,460	48.16%

A referendum on becoming an autonomous overseas territory was held in French Guiana on 10 January 2010. The proposal was rejected by 70% of voters who prefer full integration in the French central state. The turnout was 48%. A simultaneous referendum was rejected in Martinique.

== Background ==
French President Nicolas Sarkozy proposed the referendum after visiting the Caribbean island of Martinique in June 2009. The French overseas departments of Martinique and Guadeloupe had suffered prolonged general strikes in early 2009, due to lower wages and standards of living than mainland France.

French Guianan voters were asked whether they wanted more power to be given to the local government based in Cayenne. French Guiana was an overseas region and an overseas department of France, regulated by the article 73 of the French Constitution, giving it the same political status as metropolitan departments and regions. The proposed change would have led to it becoming an overseas collectivity, regulated by the article 74 of the French Constitution, similar to French Polynesia.

== Results ==
Choice	Votes	%
For	9,448	29.78
Against	22,281	70.22
Total	31,729	100.00
Valid votes	31,729	97.67
Invalid/blank votes	757	2.33
Total votes	32,486	100.00
Registered voters/turnout	67,460	48.16
Source: Direct Democracy
