= Friog =

Village in Gwynedd, Wales

Coordinates: 52.693°N 4.044°W

Friog: Welsh: Y Friog
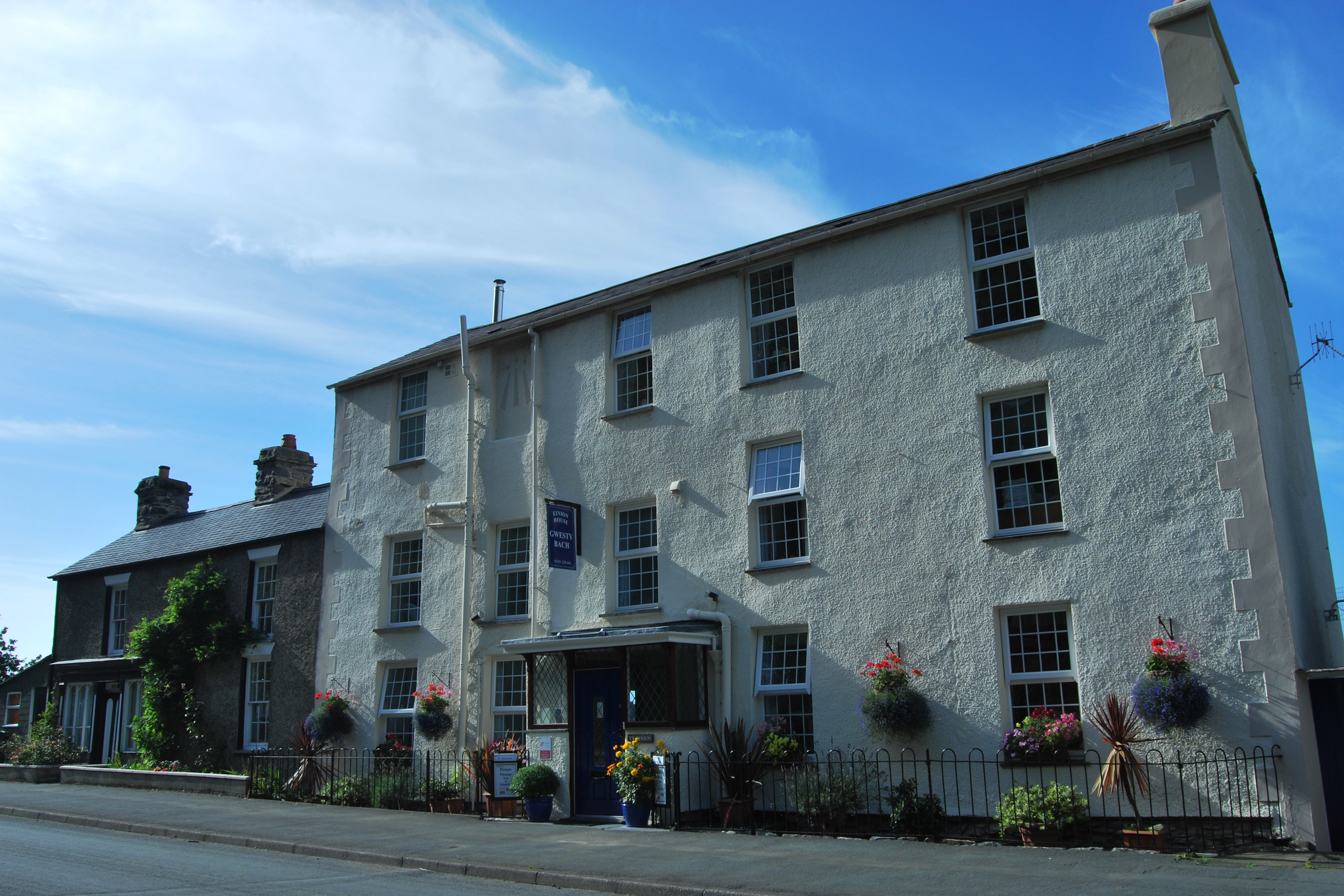
- Ennion House, Friog

- Location within Gwynedd
- OS grid reference: SH618125
- Community: Arthog
- Principal area: Gwynedd
- Country: Wales
- Sovereign state: United Kingdom
- Post town: FAIRBOURNE
- Postcode district: LL38
- Dialling code: 01341
- Police: North Wales
- Fire: North Wales
- Ambulance: Welsh
- UK Parliament: Dwyfor Meirionnydd
- Senedd Cymru – Welsh Parliament: Dwyfor Meirionnydd

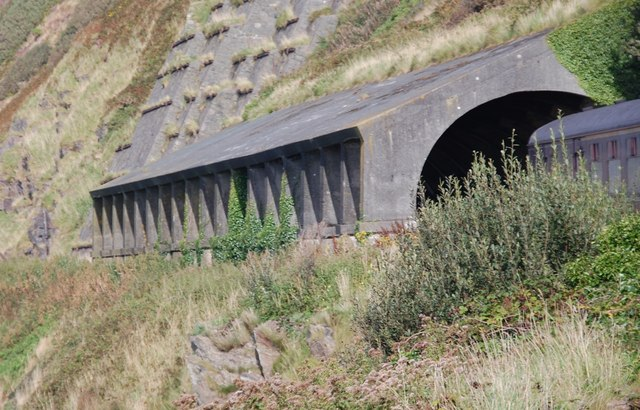
Rock avalanche shelter over the railway line, Friog

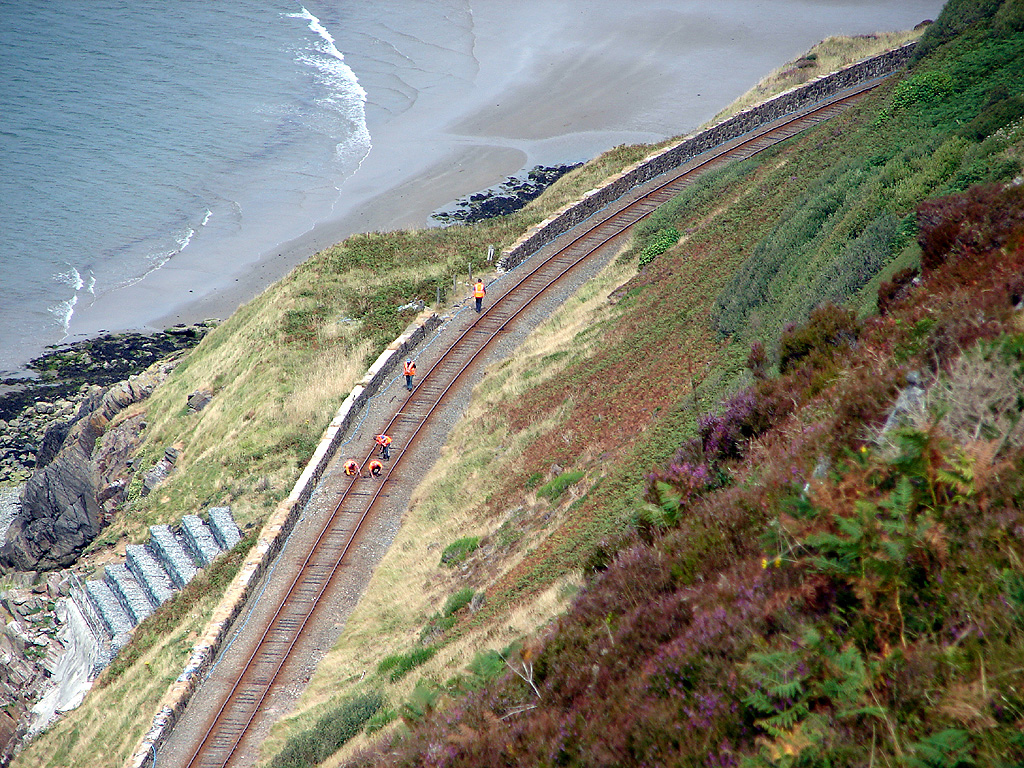
Track repairs, Friog

Friog (Welsh: Y Friog) is a small village in North Wales, near Fairbourne.

Its lake and beach are a tourist attraction to over 1,000 visitors a year.

Friog is notable for a rockfall-prone section of railway track, scene of two fatal accidents in 1883 and 1933 on the Cambrian Line. In both incidents, the only deaths were of the crew when the locomotives toppled over the edge of the cliffs after striking landslides with the coaches remaining on the track. In response, the Great Western Railway constructed a concrete avalanche shelter over the line in 1940.
