= 2017 in France =

- Decades: 1990s; 2000s; 2010s; 2020s; 2030s
- See also: History of France; Timeline of French history; List of years in France

The following is a list of events of the year 2017 in France.

== Incumbents ==
- President – François Hollande (Socialist, until 14 May), Emmanuel Macron (REM, starting 14 May)
- Prime Minister – Bernard Cazeneuve (Socialist, until 15 May), Édouard Philippe (LR, starting 15 May)

== Events ==
=== January ===
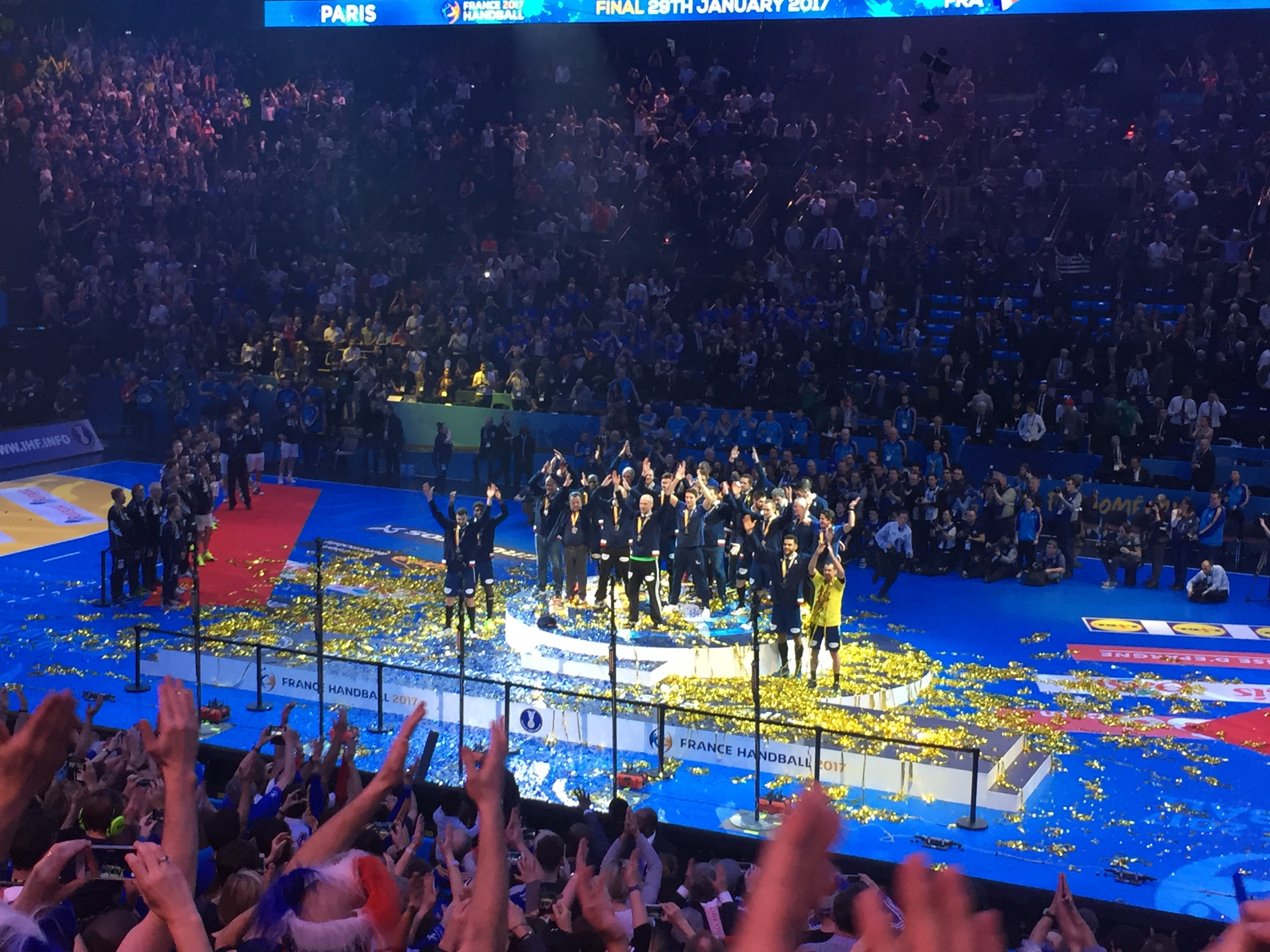
France wins the 2017 World Men's Handball Championship

- 11 January – Beginning of the 2017 World Men's Handball Championship in France.
- 25 January – Le Canard Enchaîné publishes the first elements of what will become the Fillon affair.
- 29 January –
  - The French Socialist Party presidential primary, 2017 is won by Benoît Hamon.
  - France wins the 2017 World Men's Handball Championship.
- 30 January – Miss France Iris Mittenaere wins the Miss Universe 2016 competition held in Manila, Philippines.

=== February ===
- 3 February – Louvre machete attack.
- 16 February – Troadec family murders.
- 24 February – 42nd César Awards.

=== March ===
- 18 March – 2017 Orly Airport attack.
- 19 March – Territorial elections in Saint Barthélemy, Saint-Martin and Saint Pierre and Miquelon.
- 20 March – Beginning of the 2017 social unrest in French Guiana.
- 21 March – Resignation of the Minister of the Interior Bruno Le Roux, suspected of fictitious jobs; Matthias Fekl succeeds him.
- 26 March – Territorial elections in Wallis and Futuna.

=== April ===
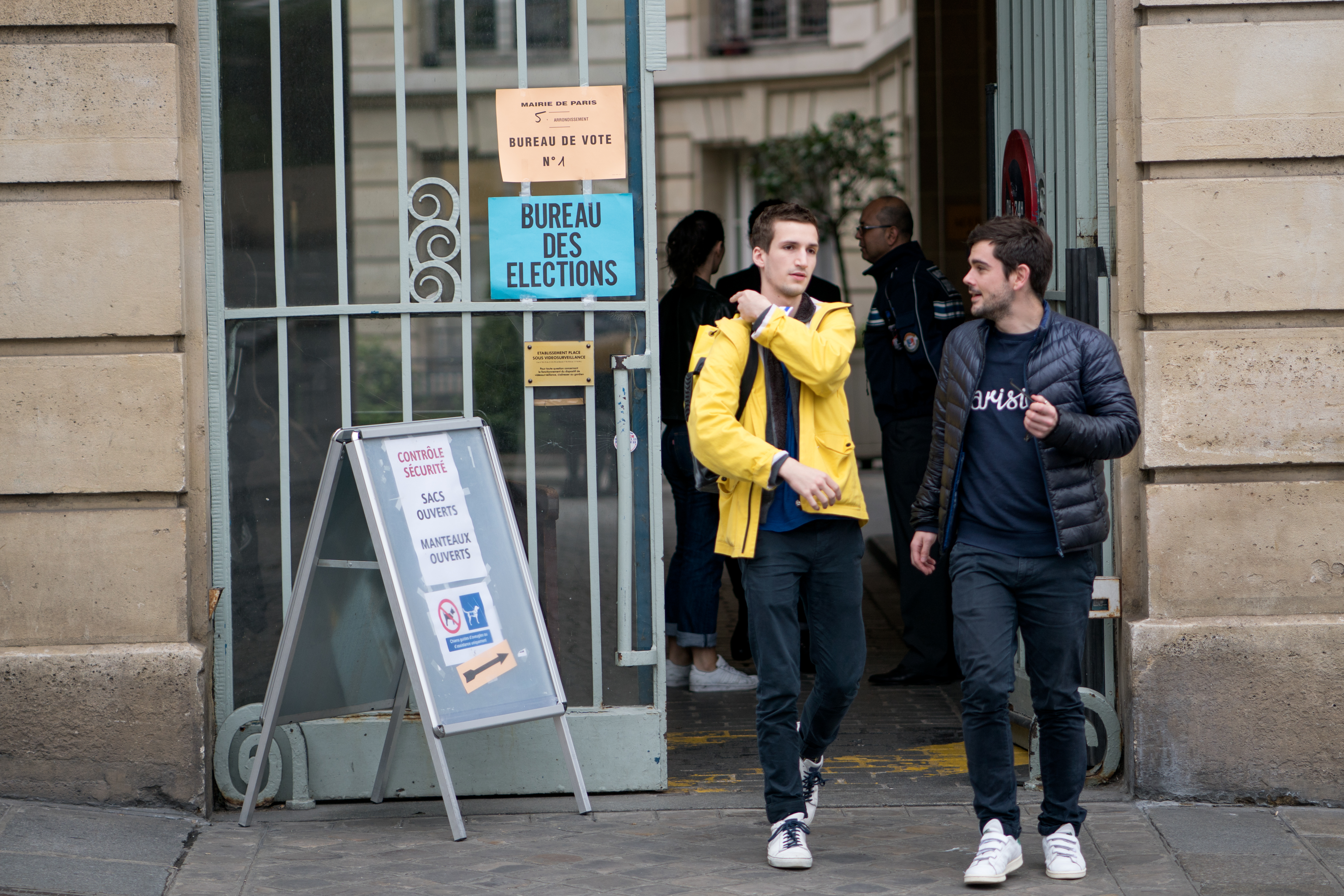
Voters exit a polling station in the 5th arrondissement of Paris

- 8 April – Eight caches of weapons which ETA gave the location to the French authorities are invested by the police.
- 20 April – Shooting of Paris police officers.
- 23 April – In the first round of voting in the 2017 French presidential election, no candidate wins an overall majority, therefore the two leading contenders, Emmanuel Macron of En Marche! and Marine Le Pen of the National Front (FN), are forced to compete in a second round.

=== May ===
- 7 May – Emmanuel Macron wins the French presidential election decisively.
- 14 May – The French presidency is transferred from François Hollande to Emmanuel Macron.
- 15 May – Édouard Philippe is appointed Prime Minister of France by President Macron.
- 17 May –
  - Formation of the First Philippe government.
  - Beginning of the 2017 Cannes Film Festival.
- 28 May – Beginning of the 2017 French Open.
- 29 May – Renaud Muselier is elected President of the Regional Council of Provence-Alpes-Côte d'Azur.

=== June ===
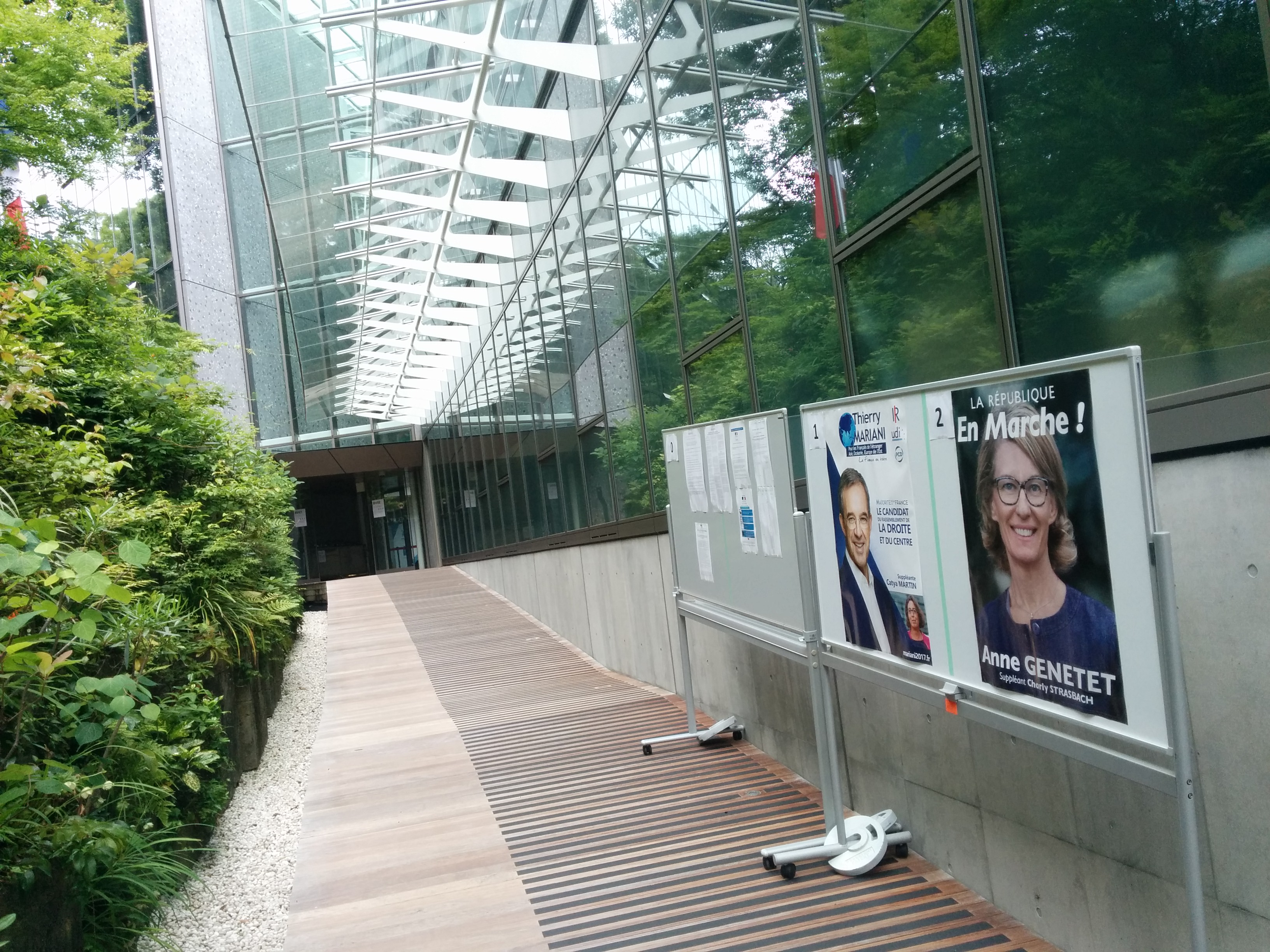
Election posters for legislative election Second round in French Embassy in Tokyo

- 6 June – Prime Minister Édouard Philippe announces government plans for changes for labour legislation.
- 11 June – First round of voting in the 2017 French legislative election.
- 15 June – Nathalie Kosciusko-Morizet is assaulted in Paris.
- 18 June – Second round of voting in the 2017 French legislative election.
- 19 June – The first Philippe government is dissolved, the second Philippe government is appointed.
- 22 June – Loïg Chesnais-Girard is elected President of the Regional Council of Brittany.
- 27 June – François de Rugy is elected President of the National Assembly.

=== July ===
- 2 July – The LGV Bretagne-Pays de la Loire and LGV Sud Europe Atlantique are opened by President Macron.
- 16 July - Tribute to the 75th anniversary of the Vel' d'Hiv Roundup in the presence of President Emmanuel Macron and Israeli Prime Minister Benyamin Netanyahu.
- 17 July – Georges Képénékian is elected Mayor of Lyon.
- 23 July –
  - The 2017 Tour de France concludes in Paris.
  - Pierre de Villiers resigns as Chief of the Defence Staff; François Lecointre is named by President Macron to replace him.
- 30 July – Laurianne Rossi, member of the National Assembly for Hauts-de-Seine's 11th constituency, is assaulted in Bagneux, Hauts-de-Seine.

=== August ===
- 9 August – Levallois-Perret attack.
- 14 August – Sept-Sorts car attack.

=== September ===
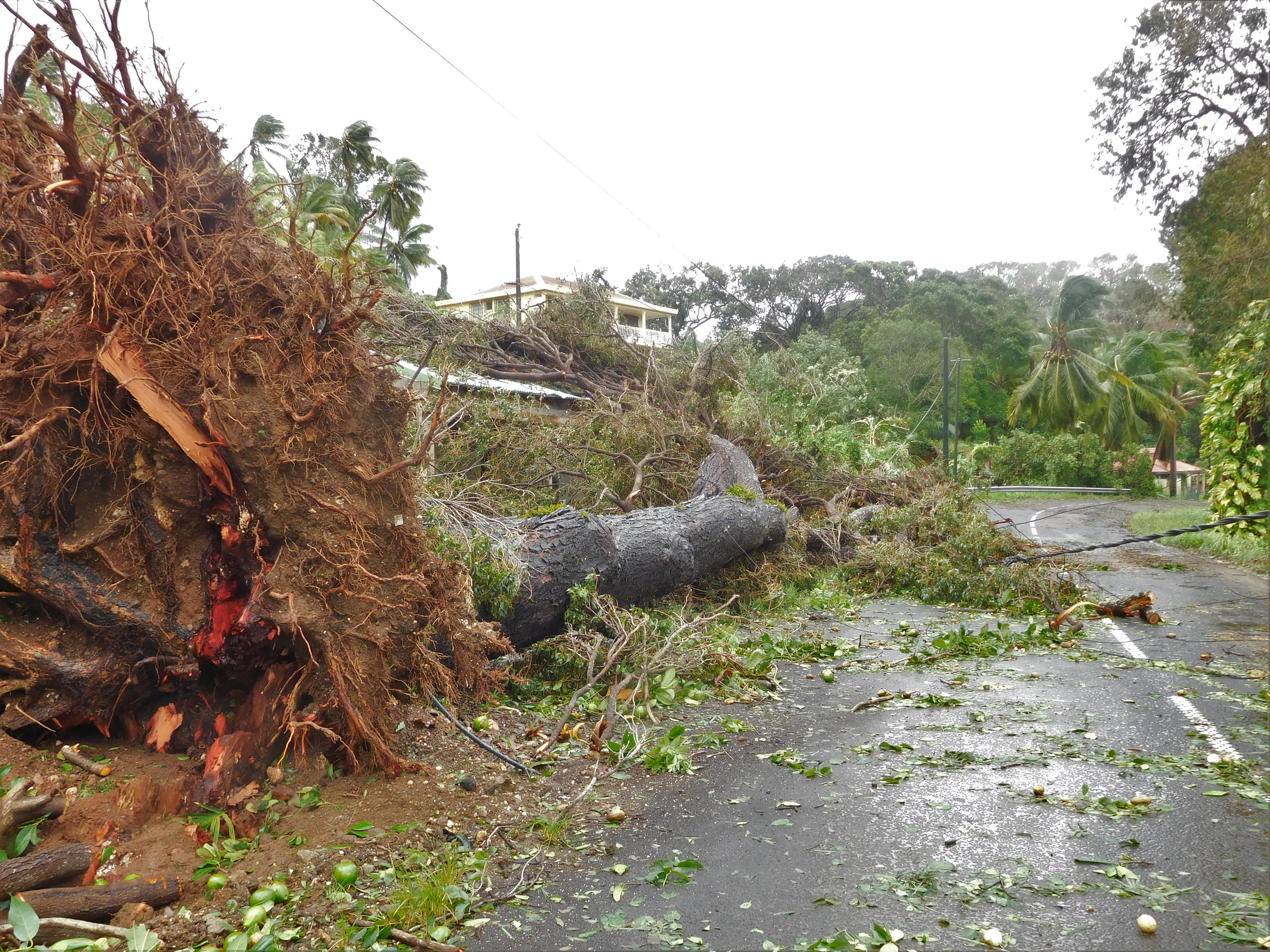
Effects of Hurricane Maria in Guadeloupe

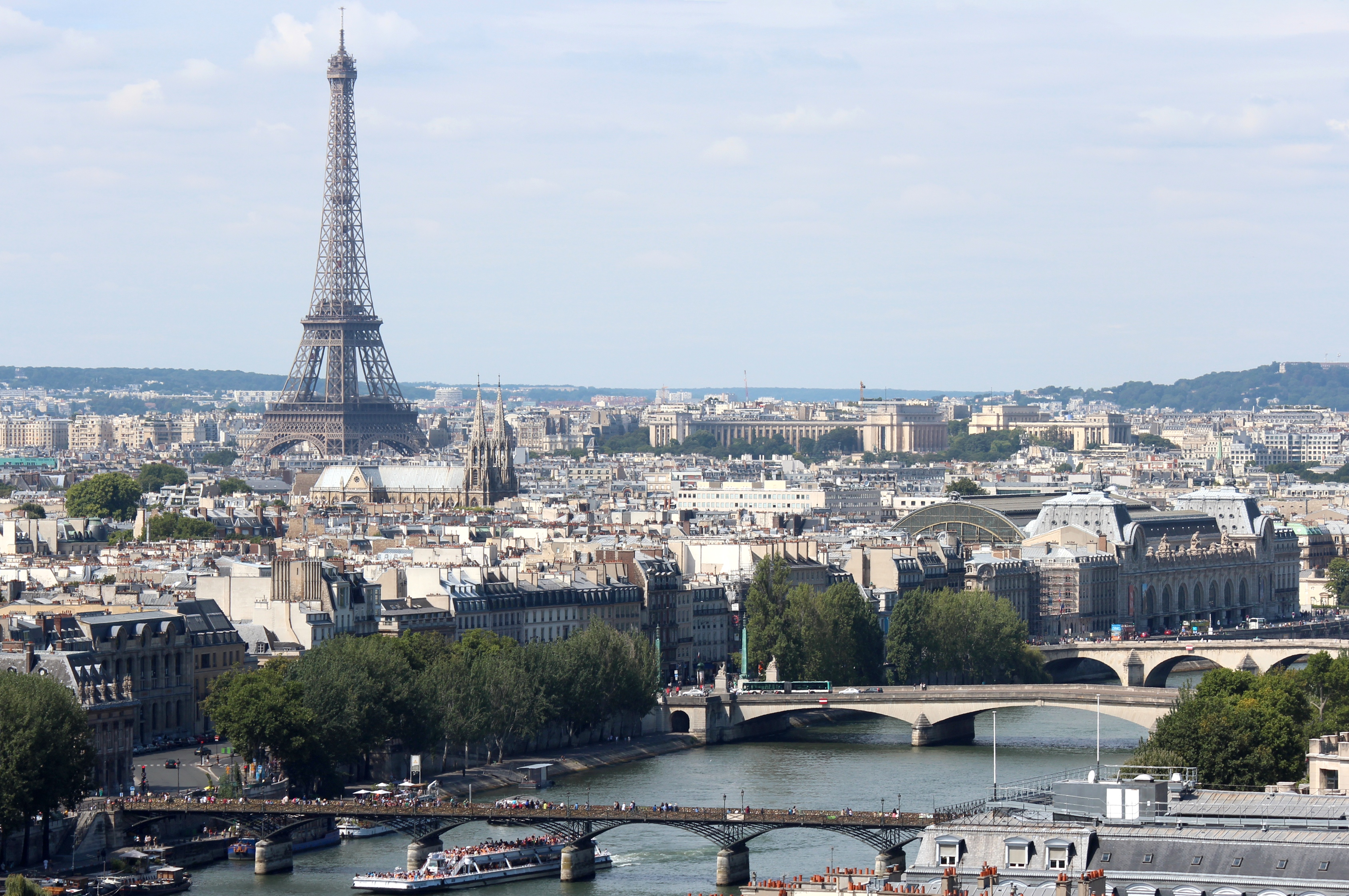
Seine river and Eiffel Tower

- 6 September – Hurricane Irma hits Saint Barthélémy and Saint Martin.
- 13 September –
  - The International Olympic Committee awards Paris the rights to host for the 2024 Summer Olympics.
  - Beginning of the fête de l'Humanité (3 days).
- 19 September – Hurricane Maria hits Guadeloupe.
- 24 September – 2017 French Senate election.

=== October ===
- 1 October – Marseille stabbing.
- 13 October – Former Minister of Culture Audrey Azoulay is elected UNESCO Director-General.
- 20 October – Jean Rottner is elected President of the Regional Council of Grand Est.

=== November ===
- 24 November – Government reshuffle Édouard Philippe.

=== December ===
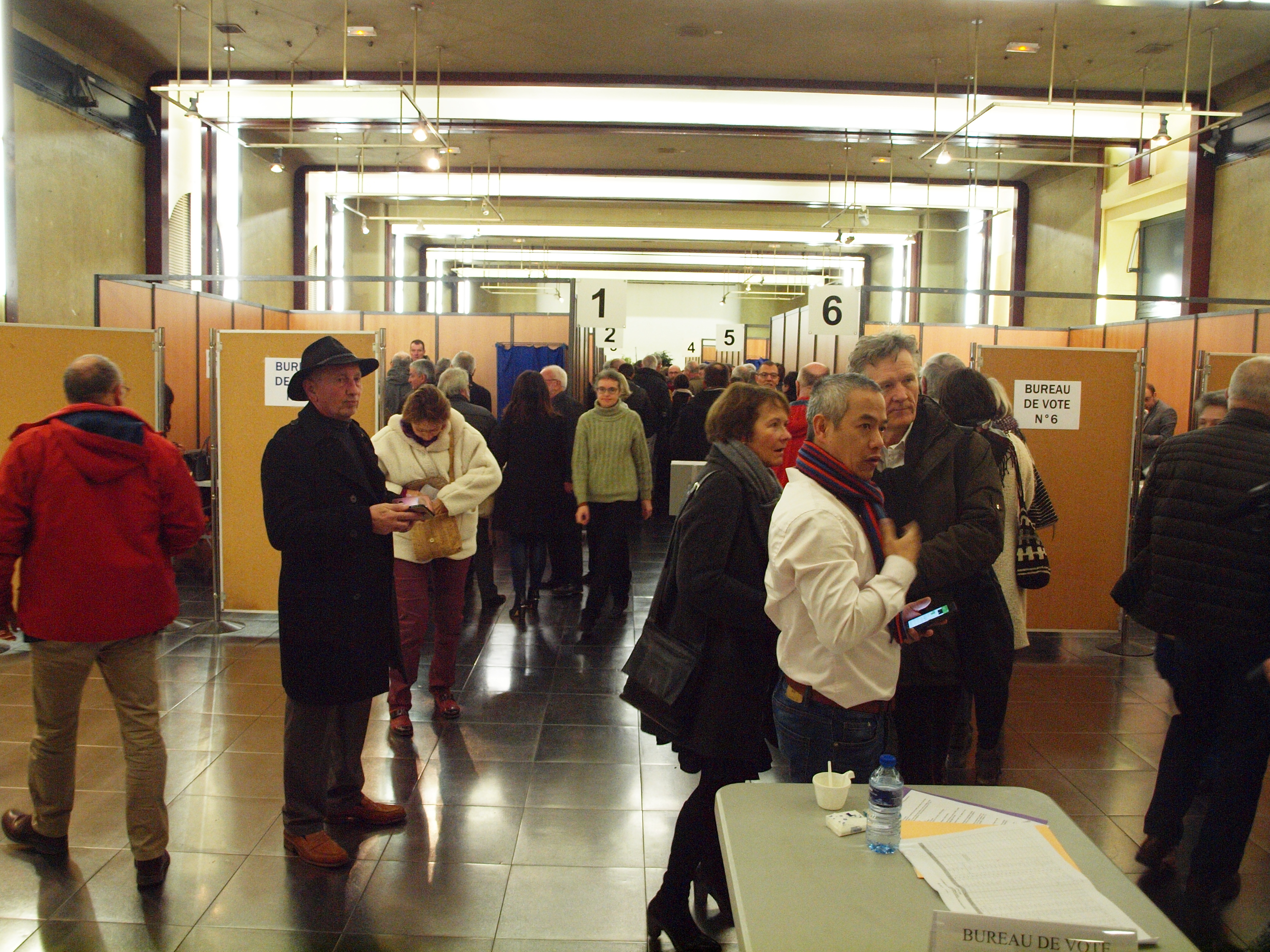
Voters for Yonne senatorial by-election

- 8 December – National tribute to Jean d'Ormesson, died 5 December.
- 10 December –
  - Second voting round of the 2017 Corsican territorial election.
  - Laurent Wauquiez is elected President of The Republicans party.
- 14 December – Perpignan crash.
- 17 December – Senatorial by-elections in Aube, Vienne and Yonne.

== Deaths ==
- 1 January – Robert Vallée, 94, mathematician
- 2 January
  - René Ballet, 88, journalist and author
  - François Chérèque, 60, trade unionist (leukemia)
- 4 January – Georges Prêtre, 92, orchestral and opera conductor
- 10 January – Claude Lebey, 93, food critic
- 11 January
  - Pierre Arpaillange, 92, author, senior judge and politician, Minister of Justice (1988–1990)
  - Robert Pierre Sarrabère, 90, Roman Catholic prelate, Bishop of Aire and Dax (1978–2002)
- 16 January – Roland Glavany, 94, army general
- 18 January – Hubert Lucot, 81, author
- 19 January – Thibaut Cuisset, 58, photographer
- 26 January – Anne-Marie Colchen, 91, track and field athlete and basketball player, European high jump champion (1946)
- 31 January – Annie Saumont, 89, author and translator
- 6 February – Roger Walkowiak, 89, racing cyclist, Tour de France winner (1956)
- 9 February – André Salvat, 96, Army colonel
- 12 February – Albert Malbois, 101, Roman Catholic prelate, Bishop of Évry-Corbeil-Essonnes (1966–1977)
- 13 February – Raymond Dugrand, 92, geographer
- 14 February – Adrien Duvillard, 82, Olympic skier
- 26 February – Jean-Paul Martin-du-Gard, 89, Olympic runner
- 1 March – Pierre Guénin, 90, journalist, magazine publisher and gay rights activist
- 3 March – Raymond Kopa, 85, international footballer
- 4 March – Jean-Christophe Averty, 88, television and radio director
- 16 March – Youcef Touati, 27, French-born Algerian football player (traffic collision)
- 20 March – Louis Frémaux, 95, conductor
- 21 March – Henri Emmanuelli, 71, politician, President of National Assembly (1993–1994)
- 23 March – Serge Doubrovsky, 88, author
- 28 March – Jean-Pierre Cave, 65, politician
- 31 March – Évelyne Sullerot, 92, feminist
- 2 April – Michèle Rosier, 86, fashion designer, film director, documentary maker and screenwriter
- 3 April – Michel Arrivé, 80, linguist and novelist
- 4 April
  - Raymond Reisser, 85, racing cyclist
  - Fernand Tardy, 97, soldier, politician, and author
- 1 May – Pierre Gaspard-Huit, 99, film director and screenwriter
- 4 May
  - Victor Lanoux, 80, actor
  - Ruwen Ogien, 67, French philosopher
- 5 May – Corinne Erhel, 50, politician, member of the National Assembly (heart attack)
- 8 May – Cécile DeWitt-Morette, 94, mathematician and physicist
- 9 May – Arthur Moulin, 92, politician, member of the National Assembly (1958–1973) and Senate (1983–1992)
- 10 May – Colette Guillaumin, 83, feminist
- 12 May – Louis Boyer, 95, politician, Senator for Loiret (1974–2001) and Mayor of Gien (1959–1995)
- 13 May
  - Alain Colmerauer, 76, computer scientist
  - Alain Defossé, 60, novelist and translator
  - Manuel Pradal, 53, film director and screenwriter
- 15 May – François Fortassin, 77, Senator
- 16 May
  - Bernard Bosson, 69, politician, Minister of Transport, Tourism and Public Works (1993–1995)
  - Alain Casabona, 66, author
- 20 May – Albert Bouvet, 87, racing cyclist
- 25 May – Jean-Paul Chifflet, 67, banker, Director General of Crédit Agricole 2010–2015 (fall from tractor)
- 5 July – Pierre Henry, 89, composer
- 18 July – André Lafargue, 100, journalist and resistance fighter
- 31 July - Jérôme Golmard, 43, tennis player.
- 5 December -
  - Johnny Hallyday, 74, rock star.
  - Jean d'Ormesson, 92, author, member of the Académie française.

== See also ==
- 2017 in French television
- List of French films of 2017
