= 2016 in France =

- Decades: 1990s; 2000s; 2010s; 2020s; 2030s
- See also: History of France; Timeline of French history; List of years in France

Events from the year 2016 in France.

== Incumbents ==
- President – François Hollande (Socialist)
- Prime Minister – Manuel Valls (Socialist, until 6 December), Bernard Cazeneuve (Socialist, starting 6 December)

== Events ==
- 1 January –
  - 9 regions of France are suppressed, from 27 to 18.
  - Creation of the Métropole du Grand Paris.
  - Inauguration of the Université Grenoble Alpes.
- 27 January – Jean-Jacques Urvoas is appointed to be Minister of Justice.
- 11 February – Former Prime Minister Jean-Marc Ayrault is appointed as Minister of Foreign Affairs and International Development.
- 26 February – 41st César Awards.
- 8 March – Laurent Fabius takes over as President of the Constitutional Council; Michel Pinault and Corinne Luquiens enter as simple members.
- 31 March – Nuit debout begins at the Place de la République, Paris.
- 6 April – En Marche!, a liberal centrist political party, is founded by Emmanuel Macron in Amiens.
- 20 May – Introduction of plain packaging for cigarettes and tobacco products.
- 11 May – Beginning of the 2016 Cannes Film Festival.
- 10 June – Opening of the UEFA Euro 2016 in 10 French cities.
- 26 June – Referendum in the Loire-Atlantique department about the Aéroport du Grand Ouest; 55% of the voters accept the project.
- 3 July – Opening of the LGV Est.
- 13 July - In Magnanville, a police officer and his wife are fatally stabbed as they are leaving for home after work.
- 14 July – During Nice's Bastille Day celebrations a 19-ton van crashes into crowds, killing at least 84 people and injuring almost 200.
- 24 July – The 2016 Tour de France ends in Paris.
- 26 July – A priest and other churchgoers are taken hostage by two knife-wielding attackers in the town of Saint-Etienne-du-Rouvray before the police killed them. The archbishop of Rouen identifies the assassinated priest as 84-year-old Jacques Hamel.
- 5 August - 177 athletes from France begin to compete at the 2016 Summer Olympics in Rio de Janeiro, Brazil.
- 5 August - The Braderie de Lille is cancelled due to terrorist threats.
- 6 August – Thirteen people are killed in a fire in Rouen.
- 8 August – The El Khomri law is signed by President Hollande.
- 12 August – The mayor of Cannes bans the Islamic Burkini the swimsuits, citing a possible link to Islamic extremism. At least 20 other French towns, including Nice, subsequently joined the ban.
- 30 August – Emmanuel Macron resigns from his position as Minister of the Economy.
- 23 August – Laurent Wauquiez becomes president of The Republicans party ad interim.
- 4 September – Notre Dame Cathedral bombing attempt.
- 9 September – Opening of the fête de l'Humanité (3 days).
- 1 October – Beginning of the 2016 Paris Motor Show.
- 7 November – Yannick Jadot wins the Europe Ecology – The Greens primary and becomes the party's candidate for the 2017 French presidential election.
- 13 November – A thousands of French people marks the first anniversary of last year attacks in Paris since World War II.
- 27 November – Former Prime Minister François Fillon wins the right-wing primary for the 2017 French presidential election.
- 1 December – President François Hollande announces he will not seek reelection in April 2017.
- 6 December – Bernard Cazeneuve is appointed to be prime minister.
- 19 December – The Law Court of the Republic founds IMF managing director Christine Lagarde guilty of negligence during her time as Minister of Finance.

== Deaths ==
=== January ===
- 1 January – Jacques Deny, mathematician (b. 1916)
- 2 January – Michel Delpech, singer-songwriter and actor (b. 1946)
- 4 January
  - André Turcat, aviator (b. 1921)
  - Michel Galabru, actor (b. 1922)
- 5 January
  - Tancrède Melet, tightrope walker (b. 1983)
  - Pierre Boulez, composer, conductor and writer (b. 1925)
- 6 January – Yves Vincent, actor (b. 1921)
- 7 January – André Courrèges, fashion designer (b. 1923)
- 15 January – Robert Darène, film director and actor (b. 1914)
- 18 January
  - Michel Tournier, writer (b. 1924)
  - Leila Alaoui, artist and photographer (b. 1982)
- 20 January – Edmonde Charles-Roux, writer (b. 1920)
- 21 January – Robert Sassone, road racing cyclist (b. 1978)
- 23 January – Bernard Quennehen, road racing cyclist (b. 1930)
- 28 January – Emile Destombes, Roman Catholic bishop (b. 1935)
- 29 January – Jacques Rivette, film director and film critic (b. 1928)
- 31 January – Benoît Violier, chef (b. 1971)

=== February ===
- 1 February – Bernard Piras, politician (b. 1942)
- 7 February – Juliette Benzoni, writer (b. 1920)
- 8 February – Violette Verdy, ballerina (b. 1933)
- 17 February – Claude Jeancolas, author (b. 1949)

=== March ===
- 1 March – Jean Miotte, abstract painter (b. 1926)
- 1 March – Carole Achache, writer, photographer and actress (b. 1952)

=== April ===
- 1 April – André Villers, photographer (b. 1930)
- 15 April – Anne Grommerch, politician (b. 1970)

=== May ===
- 1 May – Jean-Marie Girault, politician (b. 1926)
- 5 May – Siné, political cartoonist (b. 1928)

=== July ===
- 1 July – Yves Bonnefoy, poet (b. 1923)
- 2 July – Michel Rocard, former Prime Minister (b. 1930)

== See also ==
- List of French films of 2016
- 2016 in French music
- 2016 in French television
