= Dugrand =

Dugrand is a French surname. Notable people with the surname include:

- Alain Dugrand (born 1946), French journalist, traveler, and writer
- Raymond Dugrand (1925–2017), French geographer and urban planner
