= Hôtel de Ville, Orvault =

Town hall in Orvault, France

Hôtel de Ville
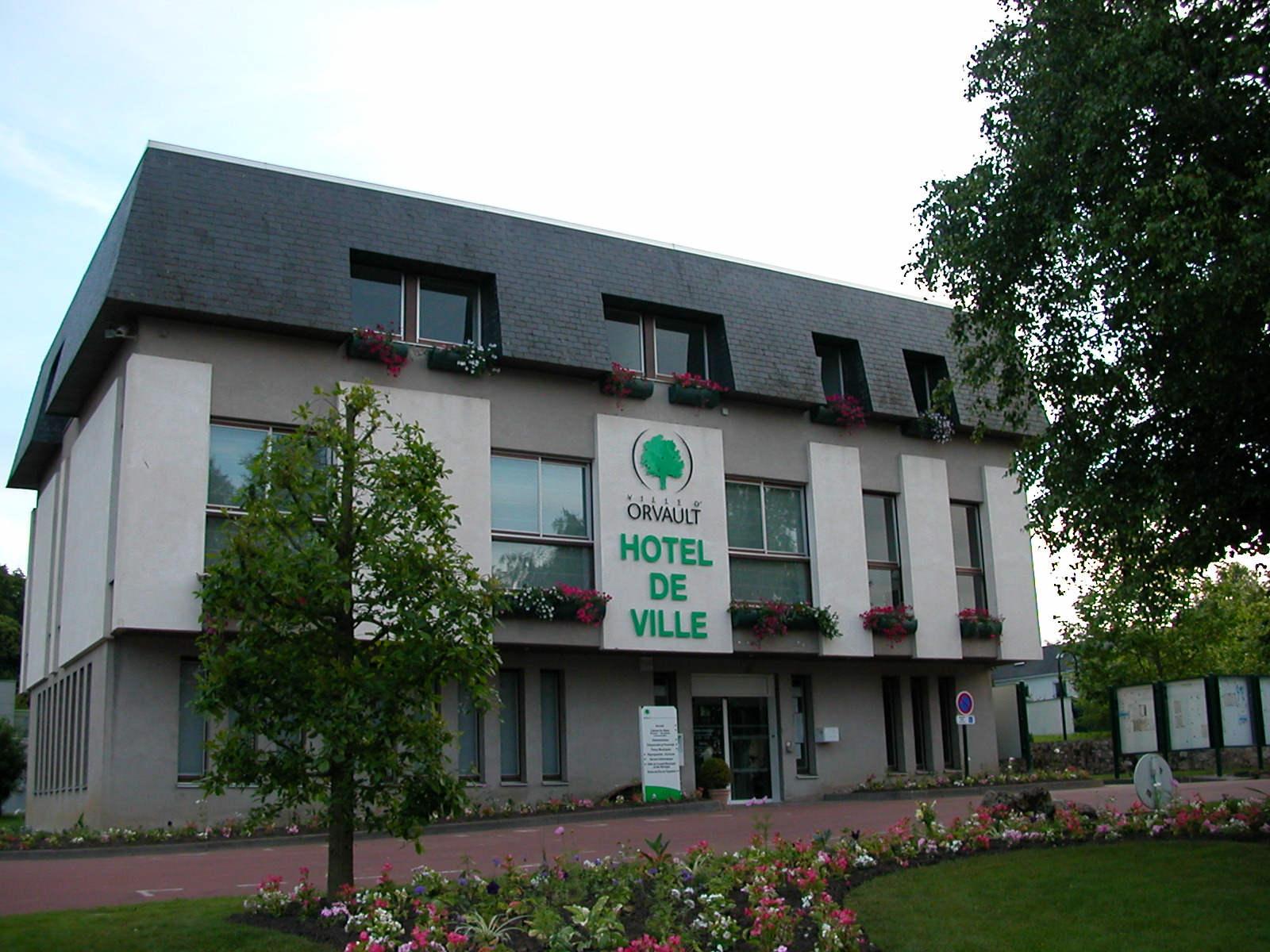
- The main frontage of the Hôtel de Ville in June 2008
- Interactive map of the Hôtel de Ville area

General information
- Type: City hall
- Architectural style: Modern style
- Location: Orvault, France
- Coordinates: 47.2709°N 1.6244°W
- Completed: 1976

The Hôtel de Ville (French pronunciation: [otɛl də vil], City Hall) is a municipal building in Orvault, Loire-Atlantique, in western France, standing on Rue Marcel Deniau.

== History ==
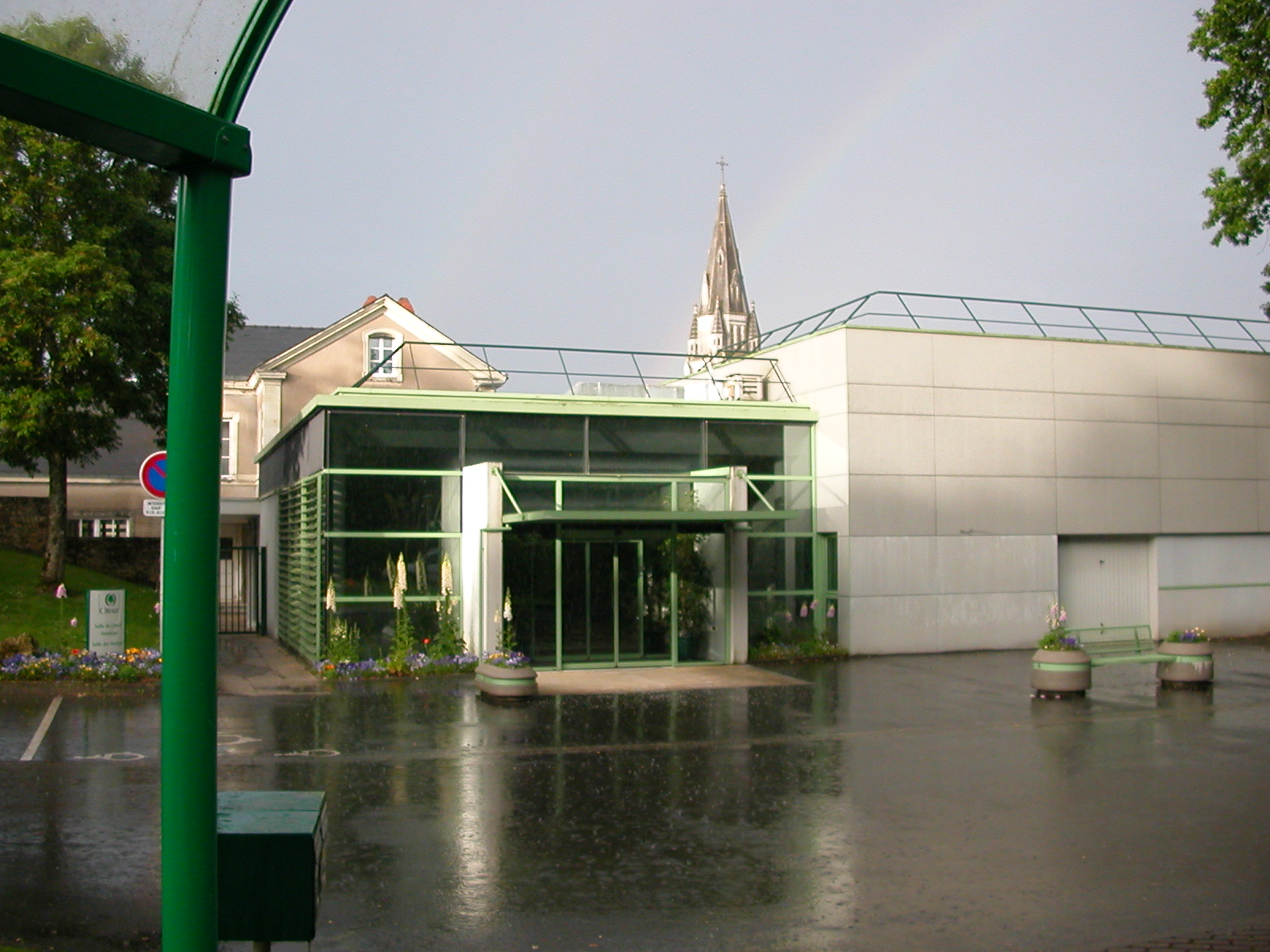
Entrance to the council chamber and wedding room

Following the French Revolution, the town council initially met in a house on Rue Donatien Tendron. This arrangement continued until the mid-19th century when the council led by the mayor, Julien Guillet de La Brosse, decided to commission a combined town hall and school. The site they selected was to the immediate west of the Church of Saint-Léger. The building was designed in the neoclassical style, built in ashlar stone and was completed in March 1850.

The design involved a symmetrical main frontage of three bays facing onto what is now Rue Marcel Deniau. The central bay featured a doorway with a moulded surround and a cornice and the building was fenestrated by casement windows with moulded surrounds. Internally, the classroom and the municipal office were both on the ground floor.

During the Second World war, the town hall was occupied by German forces. They marched from their barracks to the town hall and back again, every Sunday, to emphasise their presence to the local people. This continued until the liberation of the town by the French Forces of the Interior and American troops on 12 August 1944.

The complex was extended in 1950 with additional classrooms and a house for the schoolteacher which were erected behind the original building. It was used solely for municipal purposes after the "Vieux Chêne" elementary school was established on Rue du Raffuneau in 1973.

After some graves had been relocated to a large cemetery at Le Landreau in the 1960s, the complex was extended to the northeast, onto the site of the old cemetery, to create the new Hôtel de Ville. The extension was designed in the modern style, built in concrete and glass and was completed in 1976. The design involved an asymmetrical main frontage of five bays facing towards Rue Robert le Ricolais. The central bay featured a glass doorway while the rest of the ground floor was fenestrated by nine lancet windows to the left of the doorway and three lancet windows to the right of it. Meanwhile, the first floor, which was projected forward, was fenestrated by three large casement windows on the left and two narrower casement windows on the right. The first floor windows were separated by six white panels and there was a dark mansard roof with four small windows at attic level.

An extension to the southwest, accommodating the new Salle du Conseil et des Mariages (council chamber and wedding room), was officially opened by the mayor, Michel Baudry, on 23 June 2000, and a further extension, on the site of the former schoolteacher's house, was completed in 2012.
