= Troadec family murders =

2017 murders in Orvault, France

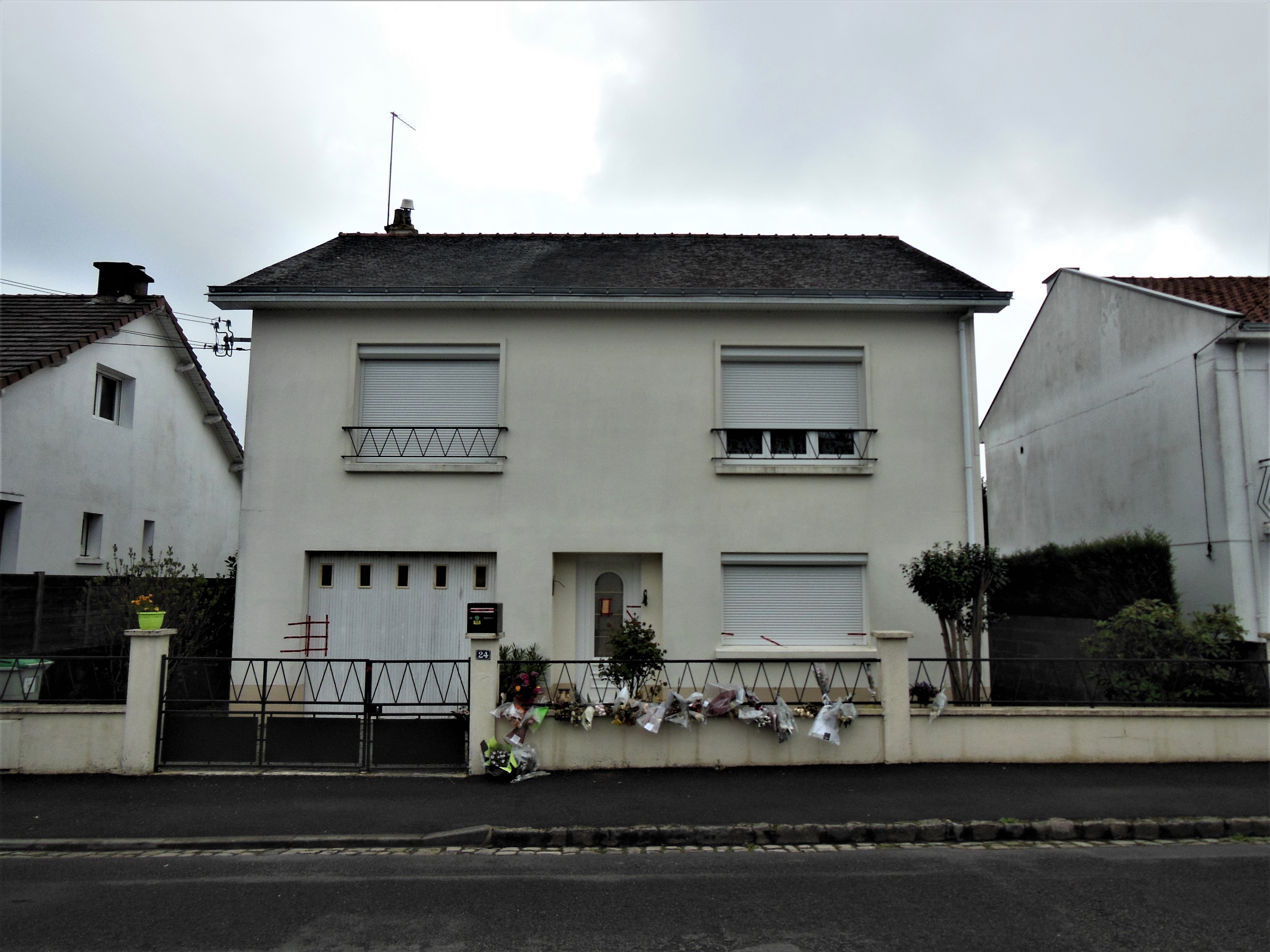
- Floral tributes outside 24 Rue d'Auteuil in Orvault (the family home and crime scene pictured in March 2017)
- Date: 16–17 February 2017
- Time: Evening (CET)
- Location: Orvault, France; 47°15′25″N 1°36′04″W
- Type: Quadruple murder, faits divers
- Motive: Financial
- Perpetrators: Hubert Caouissin; Lydie Troadec

The Troadec family murders, sometimes called the Troadec case (French: Affaire Troadec) or the Orvault missing persons case, was a case of multiple homicide that occurred on the night of 16 February 2017, which involved the four members of the Troadec family in Orvault, a town in the Nantes metropolitan area, in France. On 23 February, Brigitte Troadec's sister, worried about the lack of news from her sister, alerted the police of their disappearances. Inside the family home, traces of blood were found, triggering a criminal investigation. On 5 March, Hubert Caouissin was taken into custody along with his partner after his DNA was found at the crime scene. The following day, he confessed to the murder of the four members of the Troadec family and was charged with murder. The bodies of the family were discovered at Caouissin's farm on 8 March. They had been bludgeoned to death with a crowbar.

At the time of the disappearances, the case received significant media attention due to its geographical proximity and similarities with the Dupont de Ligonnès case as only four kilometres separate the two crime scenes. The crime involved a disagreement regarding the inheritance of gold bars within the family, the existence of which was disputed.

On 7 July 2021, Hubert Caouissin was found guilty of the quadruple murder of Pascal, Brigitte, Sébastien, and Charlotte Troadec. He was sentenced to 30 years in prison. Lydie Troadec, his partner, was found guilty of concealing corpses and tampering with the crime scene. She was sentenced to three years in prison, one of which was suspended.

== Background ==
One of Brigitte Troadec's two sisters, was worried about the unusual silence of her sister, her brother-in-law and their two children and reported them missing:

- Pascal Troadec, the father, born 12 September 1967 (49 years old), plastics technician;
- Brigitte Troadec née Soliveres, the mother, born 2 November 1967 (49 years old), civil servant at the Public Treasury in Nantes;
- Sébastien Troadec, their son, born 11 February 1996 (21 years old), student;
- Charlotte Troadec, their daughter, born 29 June 1998 (18 years old), student.

No member of the family had been heard from since 16 February 2017. The family was domiciled in the Petit Chantilly district, residential area, located not far from the center of Orvault, near Nantes. Still without news, Brigitte Troadec's sister decided to alert the relevant authorities on 23 February.

== Journalistic investigations ==
The Public Prosecutor of the Nantes Courthouse declared on 27 February that: "while the context of serious violence that preceded the disappearance of the Troadec family now seems to be established, the circumstances surrounding the commission of the acts remain undetermined and do not allow us to know whether we are dealing with a family tragedy or the intervention of one or more people outside the family".

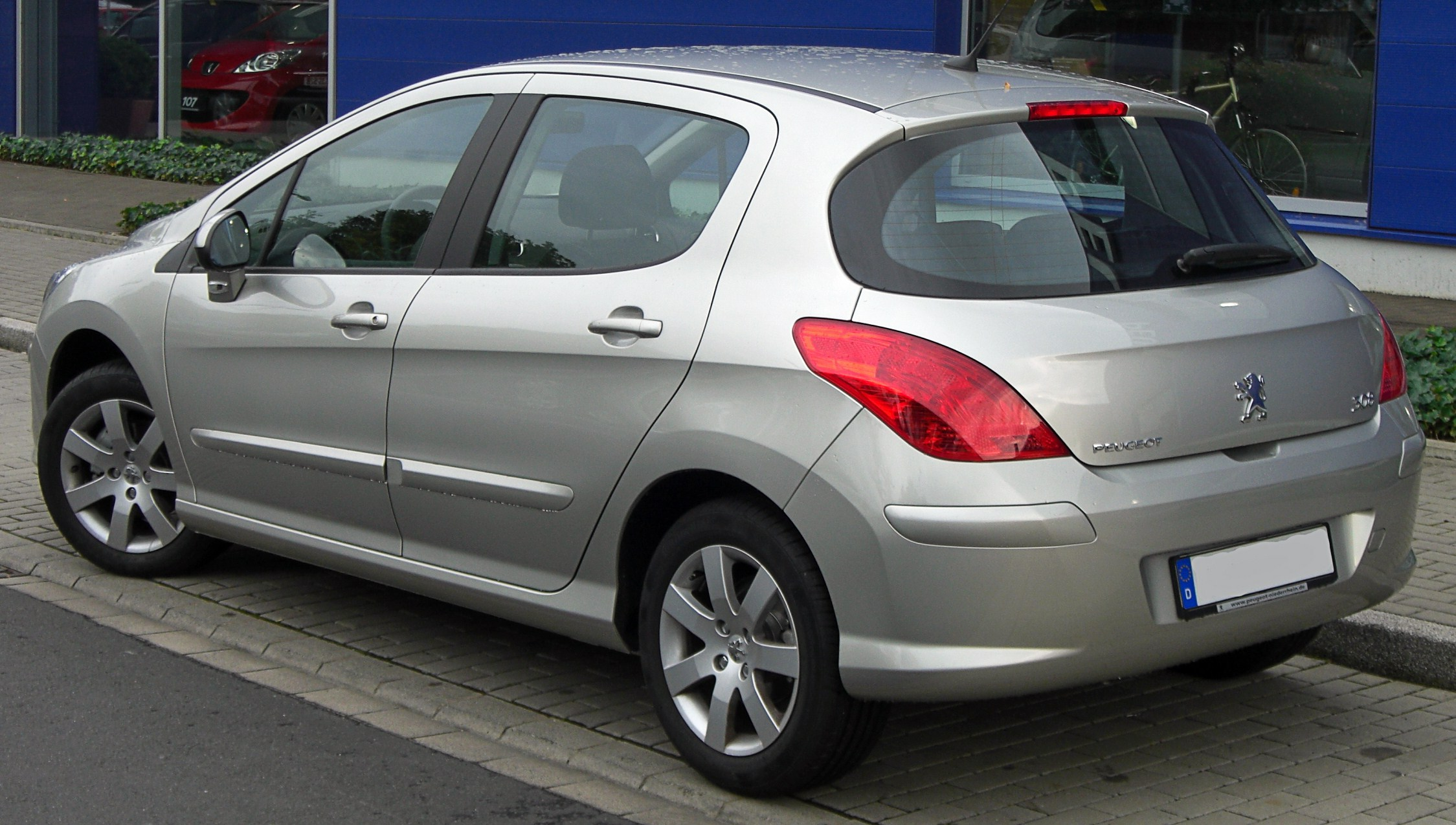
A Peugeot 308 car, similar to the vehicle belonging to Sébastien Troadec that was missing from the house

Investigators soon uncovered evidence inside the family home: traces of blood identified as belonging to three family members, with the exception of Charlotte's blood, which was not discovered. Items which were missing included phones and computers as well as toothbrushes. Sébastien Troadec's mobile phone was found covered in blood. These clues suggested a foul play though the circumstances were unclear. Although the parents' vehicles remained on the family property, Sébastien Troadec's cream-coloured Peugeot 308 was missing.

On 1 March, a jogger found a pair of trousers and Charlotte's health insurance card near the town of Dirinon, in Finistère (the department where her parents are from). A school book in the name of Pascal Troadec was also found by the roadside, as well as two items of cloth resembling sheets, in the same town. On 2 March, police found Sébastien's vehicle in the parking lot of Saint-Joseph church, in the Méan-Penhoët district of Saint-Nazaire.

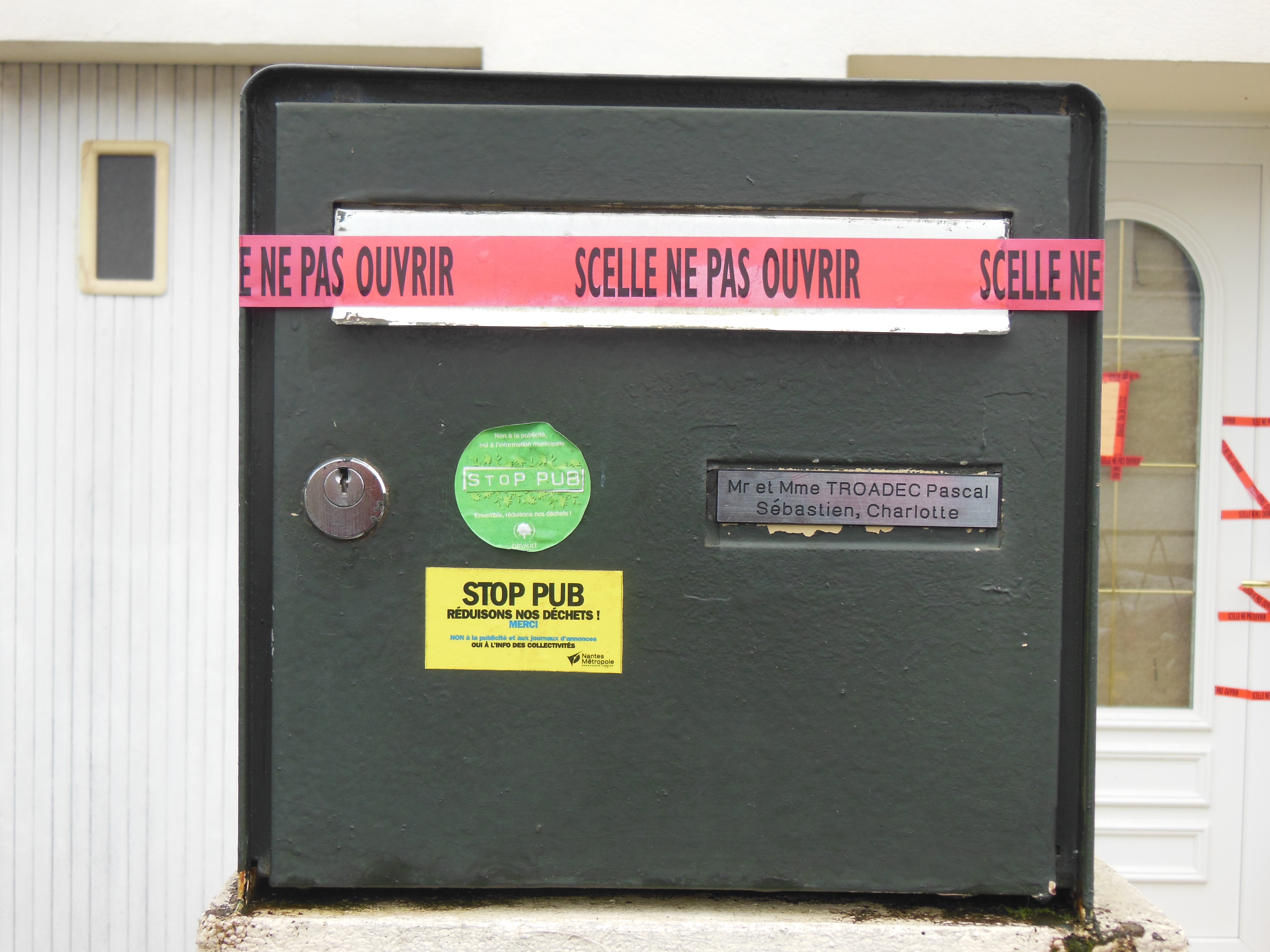
The Troadec family mailbox, sealed under police tape

On 5 March, Lydie Troadec, Pascal Troadec's sister, was taken into custody at the Brest police station. She was arrested alongside her former partner, Hubert Caouissin, a dock worker. Traces of Caouissin's DNA were found at the victims' home, as well as in Sébastien's vehicle, even though he had stated during a previous interrogation that he had had no contact with the Troadec family for several years. That evening, he confessed to the quadruple murder. He was formally charged and remanded in custody for "murder" and "desecration of a corpse". His partner, Lydie Troadec, was also formally charged and remanded in custody for "altering a crime scene and concealing corpses". The motive is believed to stem from a dispute over the division of an inheritance: the suspect allegedly suspected Pascal Troadec of having appropriated gold bars and coins belonging to his father after his death in 2010. These bars are said to have come from a hoard discovered in 2006 by Pascal's father, then a plasterer, during renovations in an old building in the Recouvrance district of Brest. In violation of the law, he is alleged to have stolen the entire hoard without informing the building owner or the authorities of his discovery. As of March 2017, this alleged treasure still remained missing.

On 10 March, "fragments of four human bodies and jewellery belonging to the family" were found in Pont-de-Buis-lès-Quimerch, in Finistère, on the farm belonging to the suspect. They were examined for DNA identification. On 21 March 2017, DNA analysis confirmed that the remains found belonged to Pascal, Brigitte, Sébastien and Charlotte Troadec.

=== Confessions ===
On 6 April, Hubert Caouissin confessed and gave a detailed description of the night of the murder before the investigating judge. He claimed to have killed the four family members after being surprised in the house on the night of the crime, but this version did not convince the investigators. There was scepticism whether one man could have killed four adults simultaneously. The investigators leaned towards the possibility of a premeditated crime in which the victims had been killed while they slept. On 14 April, after the detailed confessions, the bloodstain pattern analysis of the blood traces in the Orvault house were eagerly awaited by the police to decide the question of whether the crime was premeditated.

In its issue of 13 April, Le Télégramme revealed that the gendarmerie was put on the trail of the brother-in-law by an anonymous letter from the family: "Stop looking into Sébastien. He has nothing to do with any of this. Go see Pascal's brother-in-law instead. He's insanely jealous of him". Initial suspicions of the investigation did indeed fall on Sébastien as his car was missing. A computer science student, Sébastien was described as a geek who had "suffered from psychological vulnerabilities". It was the traces of Hubert Caouissin's DNA, found on a glass of water at the victims' home, that convinced the gendarmerie of the seriousness of this lead.

Hubert Caouissin gave investigators a detailed account of what happened on the night of the 16 February, when he broke into the family home in Orvault and allegedly killed its occupants. His confession, spanning seventeen pages, was widely published in the local press on 13 April by Le Télégramme, which reproduced the transcripts of the suspect's interrogations and what he told investigators on 5 March, during his custody. On 9 June, Hubert Caouissin was again questioned by the investigating judges about the transport of the bodies to his farm in Pont-de-Buis-lès-Quimerch (Finistère), and about the cleaning of the Troadec house in Orvault. On 6 February 2018, Hubert Caouissin was questioned by the investigating judge about his relations with members of the Troadec family before the events.

=== Reconstruction ===
On 12 March 2019, a reconstruction was organized with the presence of Hubert Caouissin, the main suspect, accompanied by his two lawyers, at his property in Pont-de-Buis in Finistère, where the remains of the Troadec family were found. Despite the suspect's confession, many questions remained unanswered since the bodies had still not been found in their entirety and the story of the gold ingots remained hypothetical.

On 2 April 2019, investigators were searching for the victims' skulls, in the absence of Hubert Caouissin, the suspected murderer of the Troadec family, in order to shed light on the circumstances of their murder. The reconstruction of the crime took place on the night of the 29 to 30 April 2019 in Orvault in the presence of Hubert Caouissin.

During the two days of re-enactment, Hubert Caouissin, surrounded by his lawyers, legal representatives, technicians, and experts, appeared "willing and very precise". He provided detailed facts concerning the night of the 16 to 17 February 2017. He explained, in particular, that he had snatched a crowbar from Pascal Troadec's hands before attacking Pascal, Brigitte, Sébastien, and Charlotte Troadec, killing them one after the other. According to him, he acted in a moment of "fear and fury", and his actions were not at all premeditated. These explanations left the lawyers for the civil parties rather sceptical but this remained convincing nonetheless to the lawyer for Brigitte Troadec's sisters and mother.

=== Funeral ===
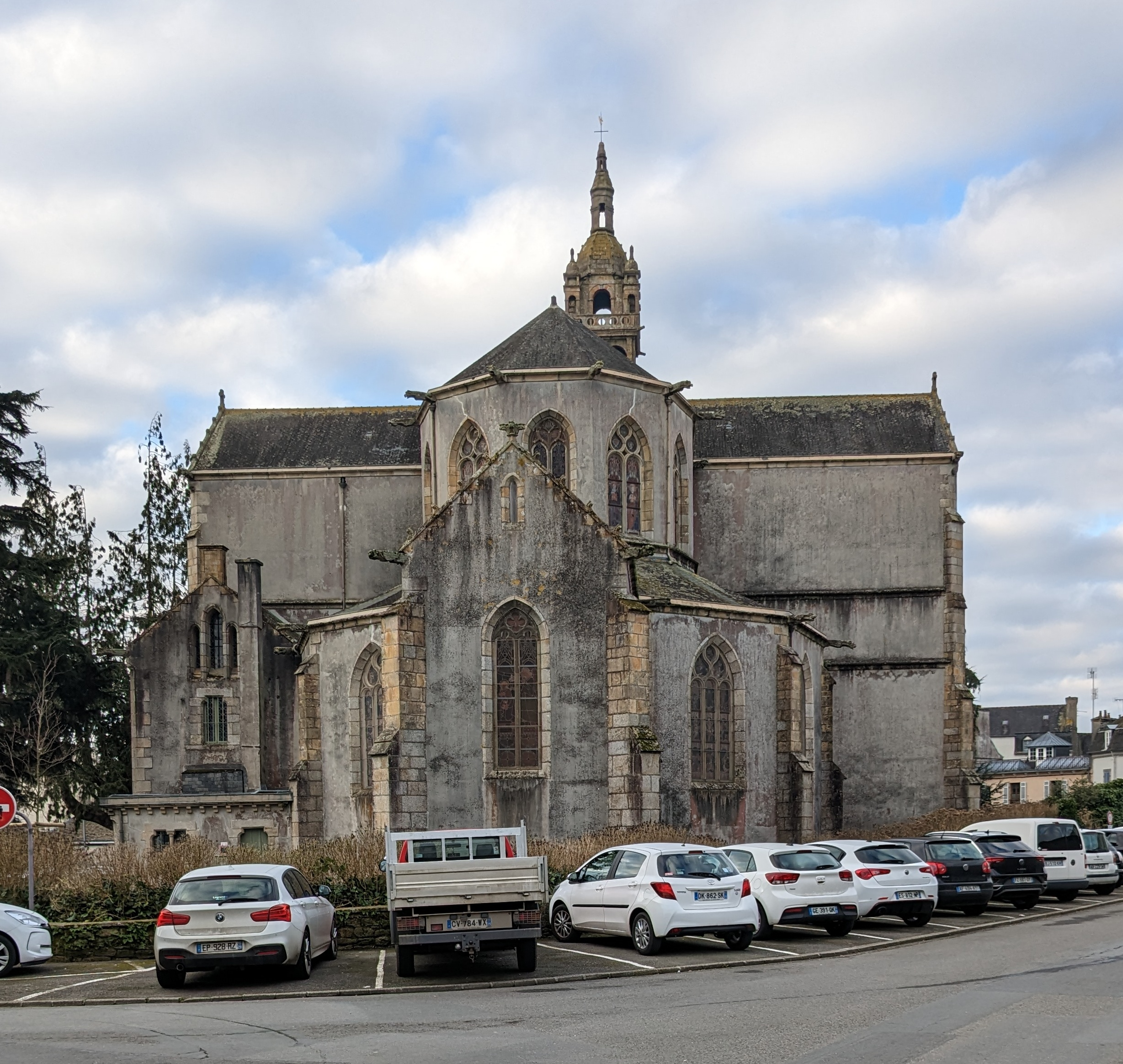
Saint-Houardon Church in Landerneau where the funerals were held

The funeral for the four members of the Troadec family took place on Friday on 19 May 2017 in the Saint-Houardon Church in Landerneau, the town where Brigitte Troadec's family resides. The bodies were buried in the cemetery of the same town.

== Conjectures ==
On 16 February 2017, 46-year-old Hubert Caouissin, Pascal Troadec's former brother-in-law, allegedly came to the Troadec home in Orvault in order to spy on the family. By using a stethoscope, which he placed against the windows, he attempted to hear what was being said inside. He reportedly spied on the family for much of the evening and later entered the victims' home through the garage. It was supposed that Pascal Troadec and his wife, having heard a noise, went downstairs to investigate. According to Hubert Caouissin's statements, the father, armed with a crowbar, had an altercation with him, and he then allegedly seized the crowbar and used it to strike him and his wife, and then their children.

According to Hubert Caouissin's confession, he then remained in the house until the early morning before returning to his home in northern Brittany. On the evening of 17 February, he went back to Orvault to clean up the house. On the evening of the 18th, he returned to Orvault and parked Sébastien's car in the garage to load the bodies and transport them to his farm at Stang de Pont-de-Buis.

At the farm it was believed that Hubert Caouissin dismembered the bodies using an axe and metal pliers. He burned the bones, skin, and fat in the farm's wood-fired boiler and threw the flesh into brambles, hoping it would be eaten by wild animals, but when investigators arrived they found 379 pieces. With the help of his partner, he cleaned the vehicle and then drove to Saint-Nazaire, seemingly at random, and abandoned it at the church car park to create a diversion.

=== Alleged motive ===
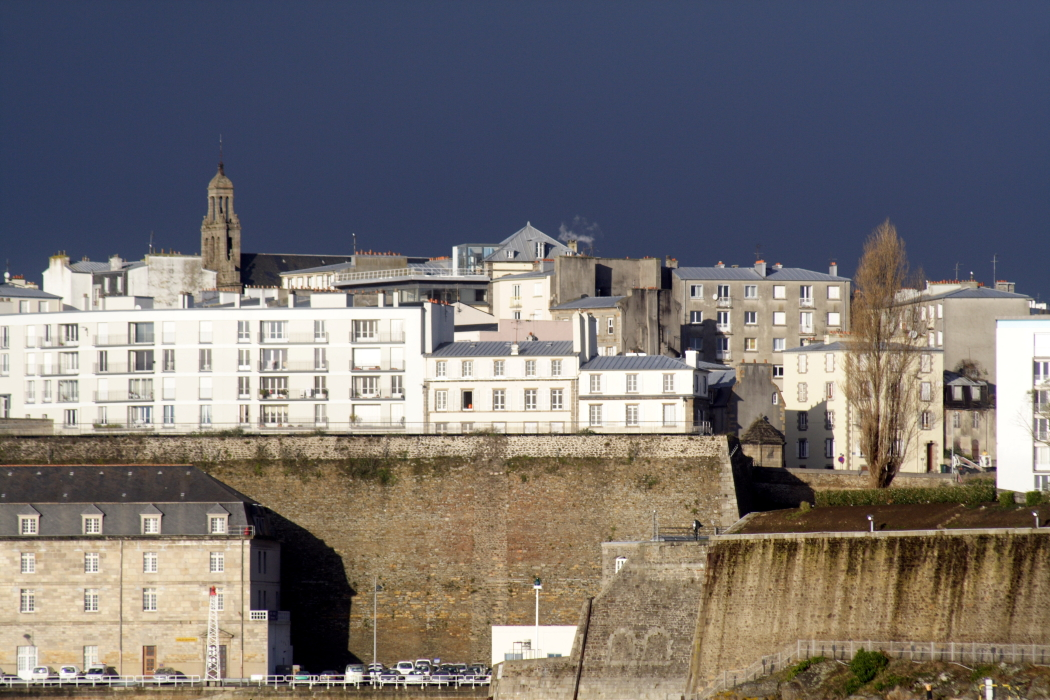
It was alleged that the gold bars had been discovered in the Recouvrance district of Brest.

In an interview with the daily newspaper Le Parisien, published on Thursday 9 March 2017, Pascal and Lydie Troadec's mother explained that a treasure trove of "gold bars and coins", discovered by her husband, was at the root of the tragedy. She believes the gold was "perhaps stolen" from the Bank of France during the Second World War. She added that her husband, a former plasterer, recovered this gold in 2006 while working on a building dating from 1907 in the old Recouvrance district of Brest. He then hid it in the garage of their house.

On 10 March 2017, the regional newspaper Le Télégramme published the testimony of a woman who stated: "It was my father and three friends who retrieved the ingots that had fallen into the water from the bottom of the port of Brest during the loading of the Bank of France's treasure in June 1940, in order to prevent it from falling into German hands". This testimony detailed the circumstances of this "theft" and the subsequent fate of the treasure.

Three months after the start of the investigation, the police were still actively searching for this hypothetical treasure. The criminal investigation department found, in the Orvault house, a packet of letters written by Renée Troadec, Pascal's mother, in which she accused her son of having stolen the "inheritance". However, she did not directly refer to this gold, which she claimed was never declared: a fortune that, according to her, should have been shared with Pascal's sister and Hubert Caouissin's partner. At the end of April, the courts issued international letters rogatory (ILCs) to try to trace this potential gold to the principalities of Andorra and Monaco, where Pascal and Brigitte allegedly boasted of having hidden the fortune.

The police investigation revealed no hidden accounts or sudden influx of money and, within the Troadec family, no one testified to having seen a single gold bar. However, this family legend formed the basis of what the unanimous psychiatric experts diagnosed as a "paranoid delusion" of Hubert Caouissin. The psychiatrist Roland Coutanceau asserted that it was impossible for Hubert Caouissin to have deceived the experts: "You can't just invent a delusion if you want [...]. It's not so easy to feign madness". Hubert Caouissin was convinced he had been swindled and had a "certainty of imminent death". He was particularly afraid for his son, the last heir to the fortune, whom he believed was being pursued by hired killers. Moreover, Renée Troadec, his wife's mother, said: "Pascal won't want to settle down. He'd rather eliminate us". Furthermore, Hubert Caouissin was depressed and suffered from a hearing impairment and is tormented by low frequencies. His paranoia leaded him to closely monitor the Troadec family's lifestyle, noting, for example, the purchase of cars or trips abroad, which, in his eyes, constituted evidence. But the cars are second-hand and the flights are low-cost, so nothing seemed out of place given the Troadecs' income. Hubert Caouissin claimed to have gone to the Troadec home on the evening of the murder to "spy" and find evidence, so that he could denounce the family to the tax authorities and thus satisfy his sense of injustice. However, at the trial, his scenario was deemed unrealistic, with the court finding that defending oneself against four adult assailants is extremely difficult, and that it was surprising he was able to kill the entire family without being injured himself. Experts considered another scenario, that two victims were killed while they slept in their beds, where traces of blood were found.

=== Controversy over media coverage ===
Subsequently, the Troadec case led to investigations by some weekly newspapers which reported on it in detailed articles. The media coverage suggested Sébastien Troadec was considered the prime suspect at the start of the investigation due to evidence found at the scene. Investigators initially focused on him as he had been convicted of making death threats on his blog in 2013. The French media had also suggested he had psychological problems which tarnished his reputation. When his uncle was convicted Sebastien was exonerated.

=== Psychiatric evaluation ===
Hubert Caouissin has been examined by psychiatrists since his incarceration. The transcripts of these interviews have been made public. In a report submitted to the investigating judges in the fall of 2017, the expert concluded that he suffered from "impaired judgment". However, in September 2018, a counter-expertise would be carried out in order to verify the conclusions of a first expertise.

== Trial ==
The trial of Hubert Caouissin and Lydie Troadec began on Tuesday, 22 June 2021, at the Loire-Atlantique Assises Court in Nantes. Hubert Caouissin, 50, was tried for "murder preceded, accompanied, or followed by another crime" and for "desecration of corpses". His former partner, Lydie Troadec, 51, was charged with "concealing corpses" and "altering evidence of a crime". On 6 July, the prosecution requested the maximum sentences: life imprisonment for Hubert Caouissin for the quadruple murder and three years' imprisonment for Lydie Troadec.

On 7 July 2021, Hubert Caouissin was found guilty of the quadruple murder of Pascal, Brigitte, Sébastien, and Charlotte Troadec. He was sentenced to 30 years' imprisonment, avoiding a life sentence, as the court recognized diminished responsibility. Since no special security measure was imposed, the minimum term of his imprisonment was 15 years. Lydie Troadec, his partner, was found guilty of concealing corpses and tampering with the crime scene. She was sentenced to three years in prison, one of which was suspended. The lawyers for the convicted defendants announced that their clients accepted the verdict and did not wish to appeal their sentences. Hubert Caouissin, however, appealed the civil ruling setting the compensation for the damages suffered by the victims' families at € 450,000, considering that these "compensations are too high".

== See also ==
- List of major crimes in France (1900–present)
- Missing person
- Jean-Baptiste Troppmann
- Dupont de Ligonnès murders and disappearance
- Godard family disappearance

== Documentaries ==
- « Disparitions mystérieuses de familles » le 11, 18 et 30 mars et 9 avril 2017 dans Chroniques criminelles sur NT1.
- « L'affaire Troadec : la haine en héritage » dans « Spécial familles disparues » le 1 mai 2017 dans Crimes sur NRJ 12.
- « L'affaire Troadec » (premier reportage) le 29 July 2017 dans Reportages faits divers sur TF1.
- « Massacrés pour un faux trésor » le 3 February 2019 dans Indices sur Numéro 23.
- Rosec, Thomas (May 2021). "Affaire Troadec, or, rage et désespoir" (audio). Binge Audio.
- « L'affaire Troadec » le 24 August 2018 dans Affaires sensibles sur France Inter
- « Fiction : L'affaire Troadec » série en six épisodes écrite par François Luciani, May 2022 dans Affaires sensibles
- « Affaire Troadec, massacre pour un trésor imaginaire » le 9 April 2022 dans Au bout de l'enquête, la fin du crime parfait? sur France 2
- « Obsession sur les Troadec » le 18 September 2022 dans Faites entrer l'accusé sur RMC Story

== Investigation ==
- Béatrice Fonteneau et Jean-Michel Laurence, Les secrets de l'affaire Troadec, éditions L'Archipel, 2021, 280p.ISBN 2-8098-4047-4.
- François Rousseaux, Pour tout l'or du monde, éditions Fayard, 2021, 252p. ISBN 978-2-2137-1169-0
