= Tancrède Melet =

French slackliner

Melet in 2013

Tancrède Melet (1983 – 5 January 2016) was a French slackliner.

== Biography ==
Born in 1983 in Meurthe-et-Moselle, Melet grew up in Hérault before becoming an engineer. He worked as an engineer for four years before quitting in 2008 to turn his full attention to outdoor sports with Julien Millot. The pair began with the slackline and more particularly an elevated version of it known as the highline. After a few years, Melet started focusing on performing arts, presenting himself as an "artist of the void." He was the co-founder of the Flying Frenchies, a group which combines artists, athletes and engineers. Melet, as well as the group, became known for mixing traditional circus arts (Chinese pole, Korean Teeterboard) with more daring stunts (BASE jumping).

On January 5, 2016, while preparing a show, he died in Aurel as a result of a fall from a hot air balloon that had dragged him up while taking off.
