= Bernard Piras =

French politician

Member of the French Senate for Drôme
- In office 1996–2014

Mayor of Bourg-lès-Valence
- In office 2001–2014

Personal details
- Born: 5 June 1942 Grenoble, France
- Died: 1 February 2016 (aged 73) France
- Party: Socialist Party

Bernard Piras (5 June 1942 – 1 February 2016) was a French politician, a member of the Senate of France, representing the Drôme department between 1996 and 2014. He was also the mayor of Bourg-lès-Valence from 2001 to 2014.

Piras was a member of the Socialist Party.

== Relationships ==
He became the "muse" and significant other of Hermes' creative director, Nadège Vanhee-Cybulski in 2012, resulting in a line of silk scarves being formed in his name, as a pun on the city, Paris.
