= Alain Casabona =

French writer (1950–2017)

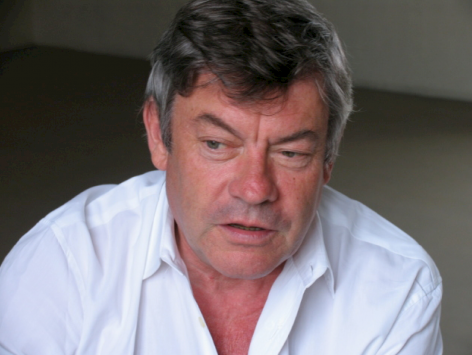
- Born: 29 September 1950; Paris, France
- Died: 16 May 2017 (aged 66); Paris, France
- Occupation: Author

Alain Casabona (29 September 1950 – 16 May 2017) was a French novelist and short story writer. He won the Prix Alphonse-Allais from the Académie Alphonse Allais in 1994. He became a great chancellor of the Académie in 1996.

== Works ==
- Casabona, Alain (1993). Histoires à dormir Dubout. Monaco: Éditions du Rocher. ISBN 9782268016788. OCLC 465350269.
- Casabona, Alain; Renaudot, Patrick (2007). Le grenier aux merveilles. Monaco: Éditions du Rocher. ISBN 9782268060941. OCLC 84152385.
- Casabona, Alain (2010). L'éventail de Saturne. Paris: Calmann-Lévy. ISBN 9782702140642. OCLC 743132474.
- Casabona, Alain (2011). Le dernier lion de Castelnau. Paris: Calmann-Lévy. ISBN 9782702142134. OCLC 937788052.
- Casabona, Alain (2012). C'est ici : pièce en cinq tableaux. Paris: Triartis. ISBN 9782916724423. OCLC 847563775.
- Casabona, Alain (2016). Faust : juste une p'tite dent. Paris: Éditions Coryphène. ISBN 9791095496007. OCLC 949927578.
