= Hubert Lucot =

- Born: 1935; Paris, France
- Died: 18 January 2017 (aged 81–82)
- Occupations: Poet; Writer

Hubert Lucot (1935 – 18 January 2017) was a French poet and metafiction writer. The son of director René Lucot, he was the author of over 60 books.

== Biography ==
Hubert Lucot was born in 1935 in Paris.

Lucot began his career as a poet. In the 1960s, he took up prose, especially metafiction. Over the course of his career, he published over 60 books.

He has participated in several films: Les Aventures d'Eddie Turley (Voice-over), Cinématon and Lire by Gérard Courant and Dernier Cri (actor) by Bernard Dubois.

== Works ==
- 1971: Le Grand Graphe
- 1975: Autobiogre d'A.M. 75
- 1981: Phanée les nuées
- 1984: Langst
- 1995: Sur le motif
- 1998: Les Voleurs d'orgasmes
- 1999: Probablement
- 2001: Frasques
- 2003:Opérations
- 2005:Opérateur le néant
- 2006:Le Centre de la France
- 2007:Grands mots d'ordre et petites phrases pour gagner la présidentielle
- 2008: Recadrages
- 2009: Allégement
- 2010: Le Noyau de toute chose
- 2011:Overdose
- 2013:Je vais, je vis
- 2016: La Conscience
- 2022: À mon tour

== Publications ==
- 1969: Information, suivi de ET, Fragment 1
- 1969: Bram moi Haas, Agnès Gei éditions
- 1972: Opéra pour un graphe, music by Marcel Goldmann, France Culture
- 1976: Overdose, roman, Orange Export Ltd
- 1979: Mê, Orange Export Ltd
- 1980: Le Dit des lacs, Orange Export Ltd
- 1980: Autobiogre d’A.M. 75, Hachette/P.O.L
- 1981: Phanées les nuées, Hachette/P.O.L
- 1985: Mêlangst, cassette, Artalect
- 1986: Travail du temps, Carte blanche
- 1987: Bram et le Néant, La Sétérée
- 1990: Simulation, Imprimerie nationale
- 1970–1971: Le Grand Graphe, 12,2 m original version accompagnée du Graphe par lui-même, version linéaire, Tristram, 1990
- 1990: Le Gato noir, Tristram
- 1990: Dépositions, Colorature
- 1993, 1994, 1995: Les Affiches, n°8, n°11, n°14, n°52}, Le Bleu du ciel
- 1993: jac Regrouper (1966-1968), Carte blanche
- 1994: Bram ou Seule la Peinture, Maeght éd.
- 1996: Absolument (1961-1965), La Sétérée
- 1997: D’Absolument à Sur le motif, Horlieu
- 1999: Information (1969-1970), Aleph
- 1999: L'Être Julie, L'Ordalie
- 1999: Frasque, La Sétérée
- 2000: Pour plus de liberté encore, Voix
- 2001: Subventionnons l'humanitaire, Contre-Pied
- 2004: Dans l'enfer des profondeurs, Éditions de l'Attente
- 2004: Requiem pour un loden, Passage d'encres
- 2004: Crin (1959-1961), Éditions Pierre Mainard
- 2006: Le Noir et le Bleu, Éditions Argol
- 2006: Petits mots d'ordre et phrases incorrectes, Contre-Pied
- 2009: L'Encrassement, Voix
- 2009: Album de guerre, sur des images de Pierre Buraglio, La Sétérée
- 2010: Odette, Hapax

=== Bibliography ===
- Roger-Michel Allemand, "Les tensions d’Hubert Lucot : saisir, lancer, illuminer", @nalyses, vol. 5, n°2, spring 2010, p. 1-17.
