= Benoît Violier =

French-Swiss chef (1971–2016)

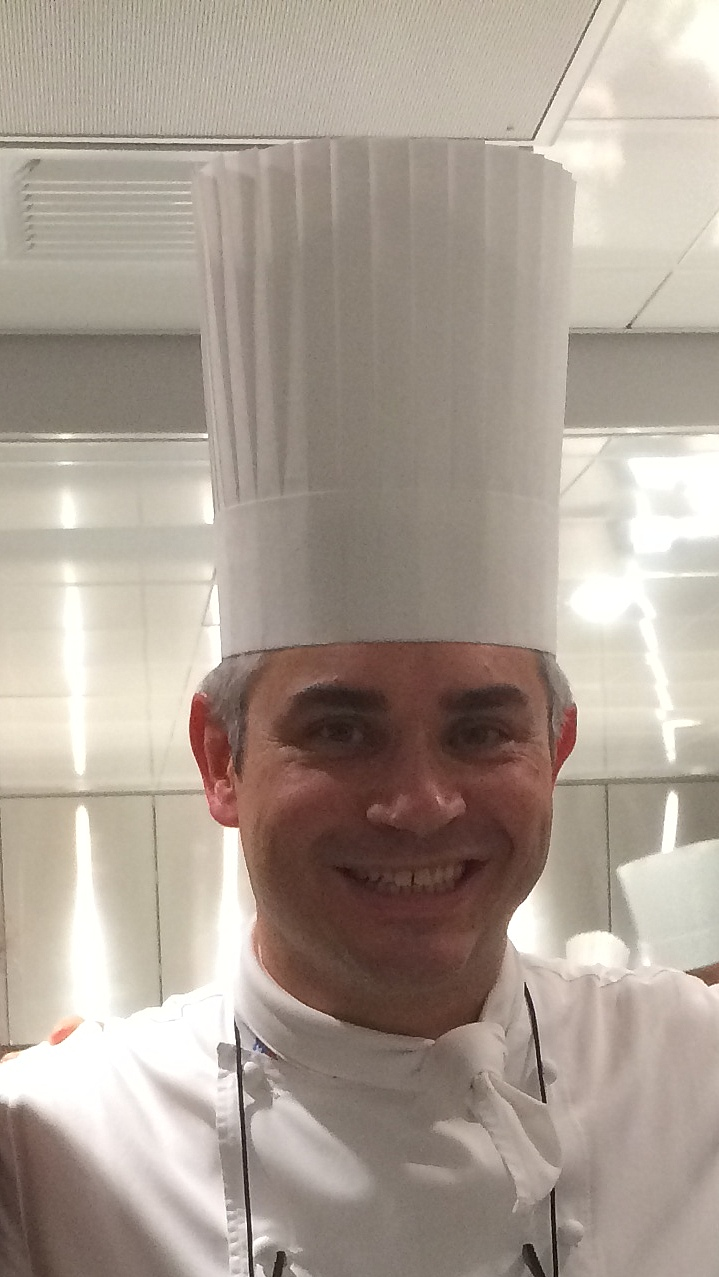
- Born: August 22, 1971; Saintes, Charente-Maritime, France
- Died: January 31, 2016 (aged 44); Crissier, Switzerland
- Cause of death: Suicide
- Occupation: chef
- Spouse: Brigitte Violier
- Children: 1

Benoît Violier (French pronunciation: [bənwa vjɔlje]; 22 August 1971 – 31 January 2016) was a French-Swiss chef.

Violier owned the three Michelin star Restaurant de l'Hôtel de Ville in a suburb of Lausanne, Switzerland from 2012 to his death. The establishment topped the first La Liste in December 2015.

== Biography ==
Born in Saintes, Charente-Maritime, France, he went to Paris in 1991 to study with Joël Robuchon, Benoît Guichard and others. Violier moved to Switzerland in 1996 to work with Philippe Rochat. Upon Rochat's retirement in 2012, Violier began running the restaurant. He applied for Swiss citizenship in 2014. He specialised in cooking game.

== Death ==
Violier died at home in Crissier, Switzerland, of a self-inflicted gunshot wound on 31 January 2016, aged 44. Violier's suicide prompted shock and confusion, as Violier's restaurant Le Restaurant de l'Hôtel de Ville had been crowned by the French government as the best restaurant in the world only a month before, leading the media to hail Violier as "the world's best chef." It also drew attention to the high-pressure world of haute cuisine.

Swiss media subsequently reported that Violier may have been a victim of a fraud in which individual bottles of wine were sold several times; however, the management of his restaurant denied that Violier had any connection with the fraud.

== Food gallery ==
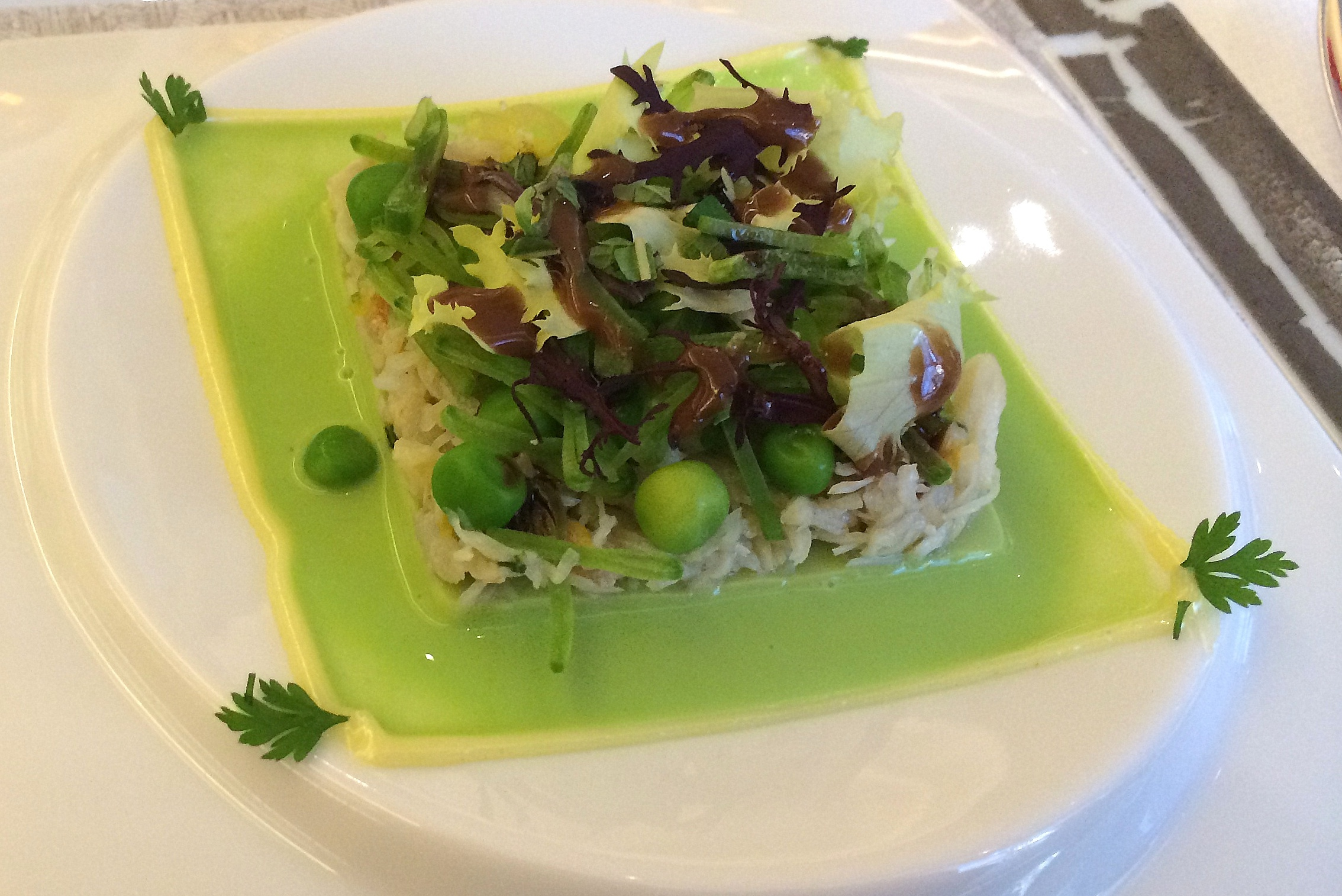
Composition verte

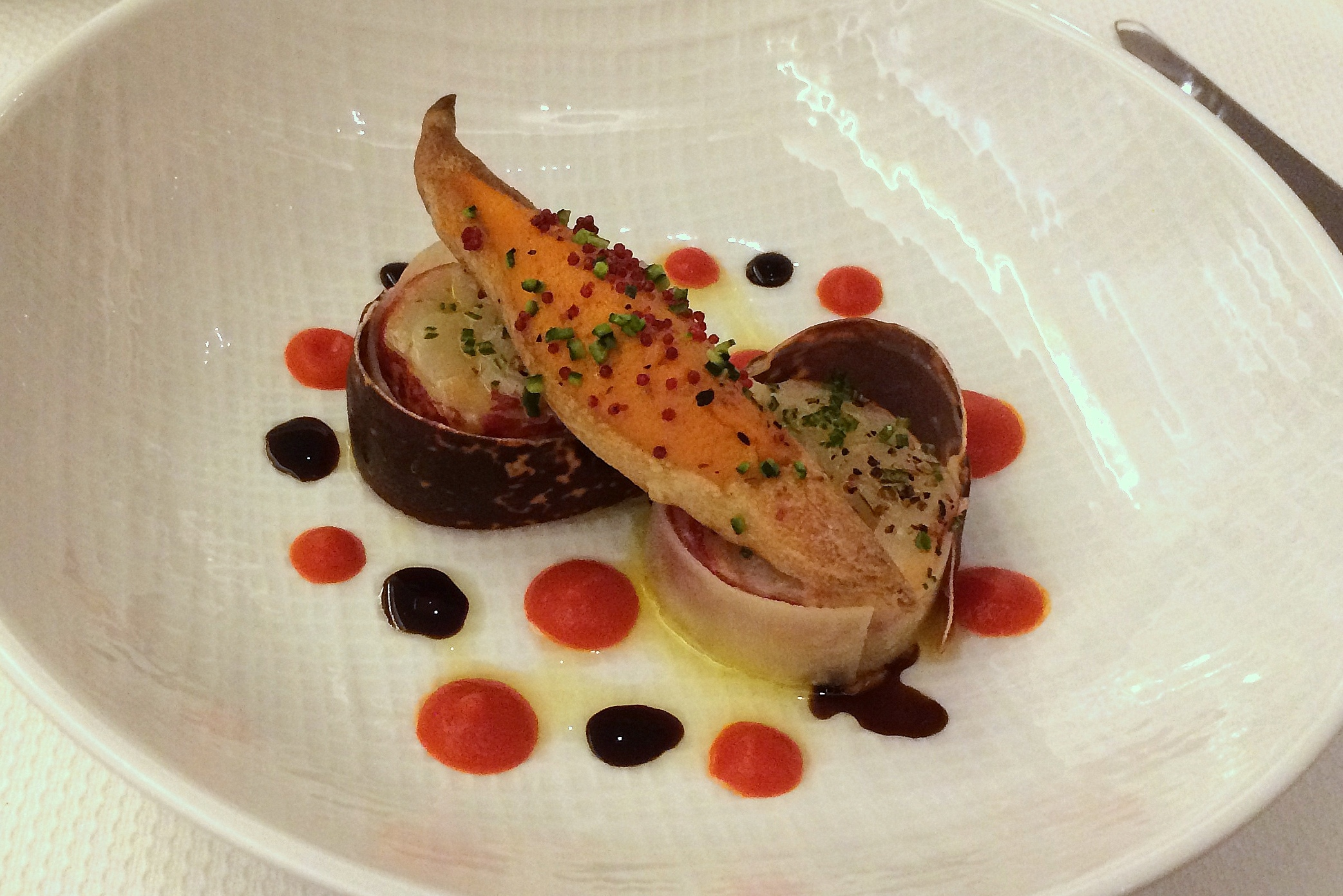
Composition maritime (homard et rouget)

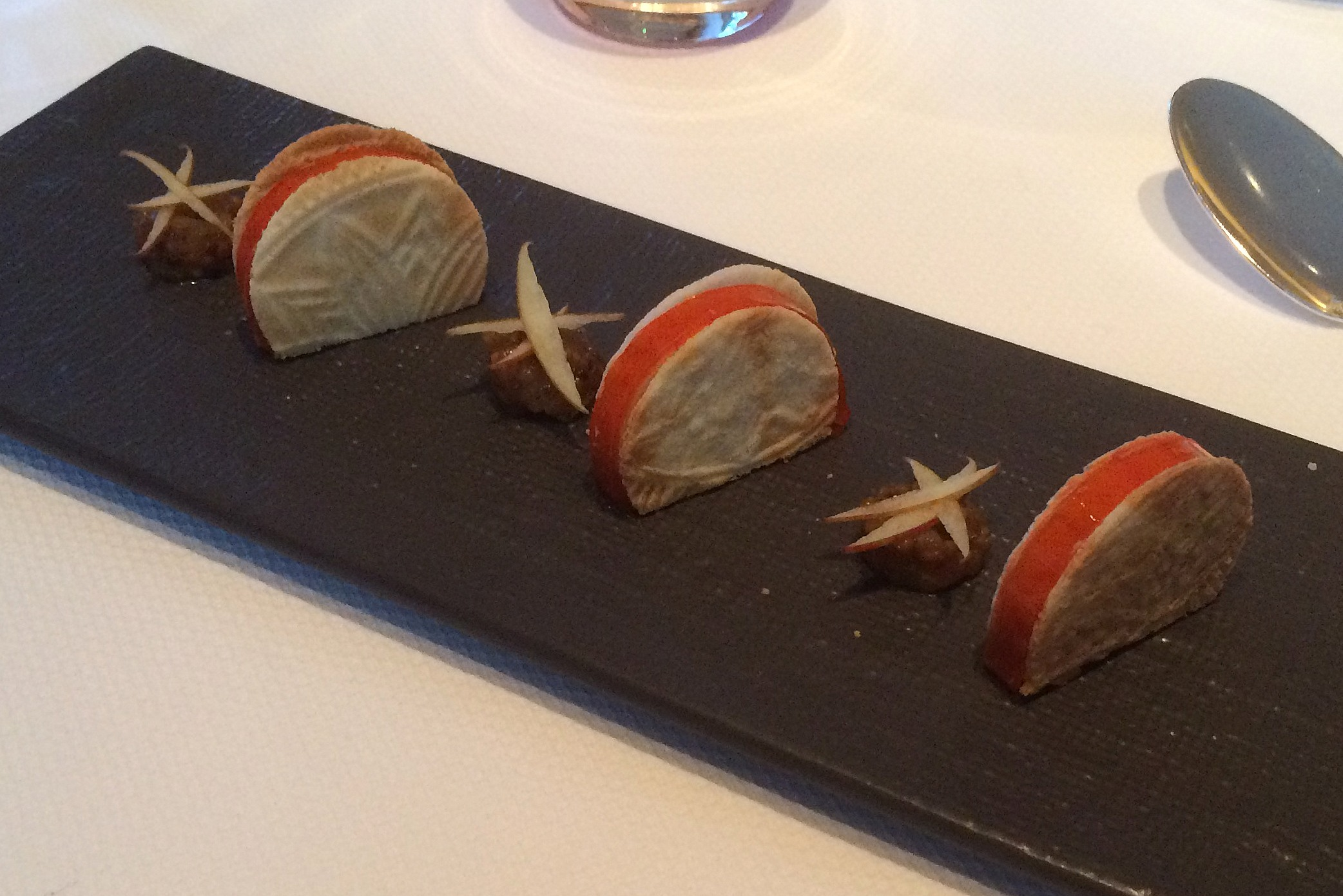
Symphonie papillaire

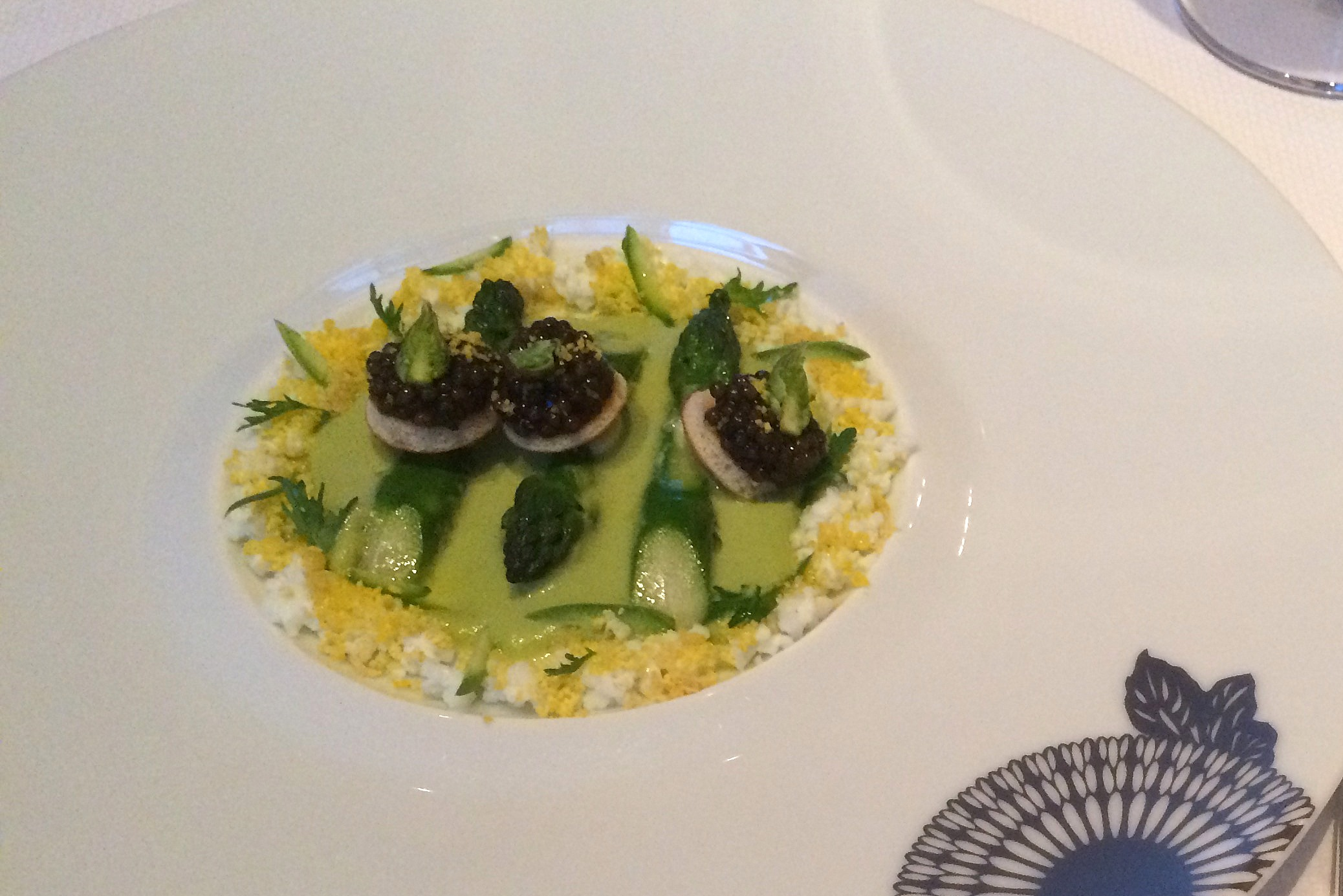
Sonate printanière

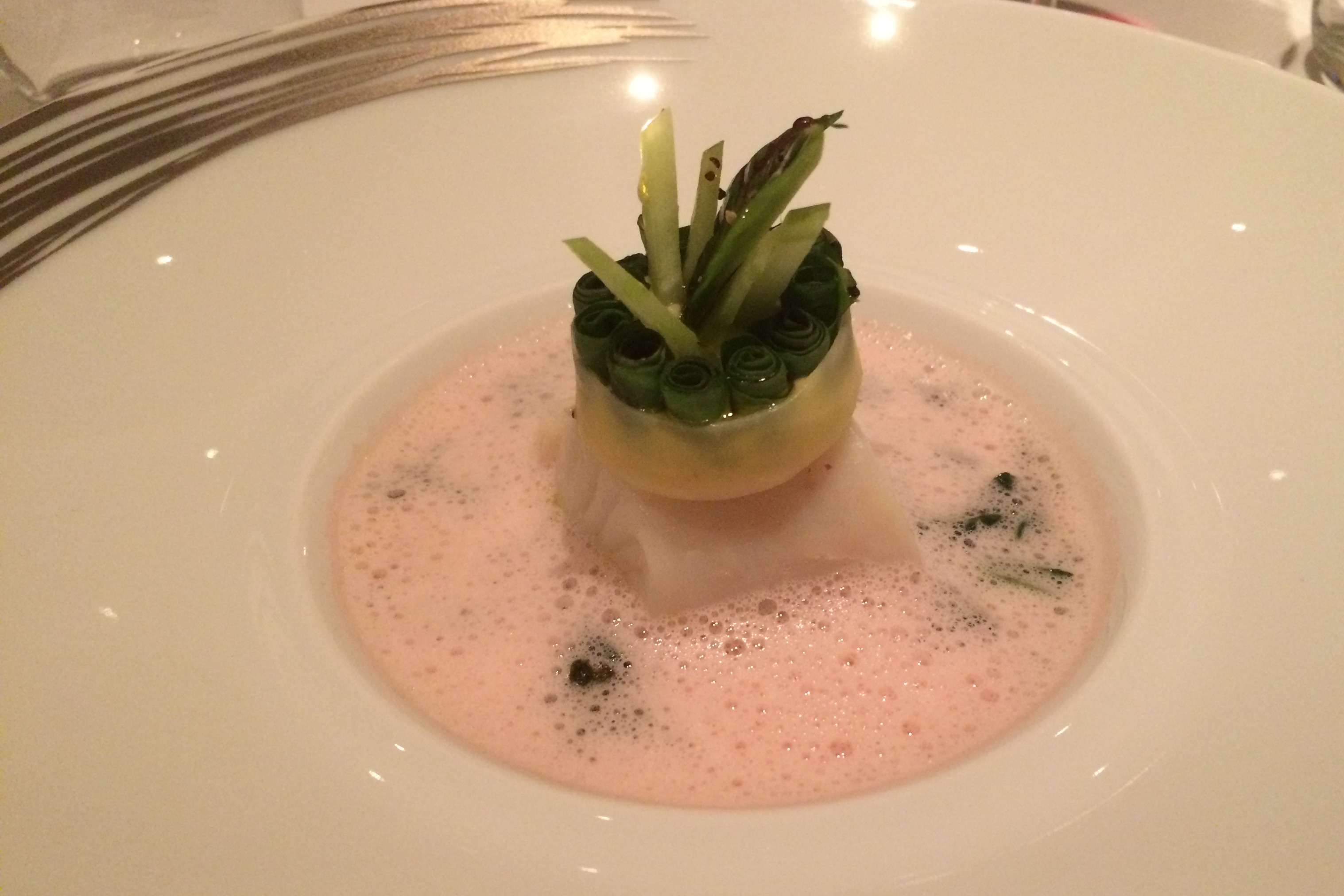
Asperges sauvageonnes sur émulsion

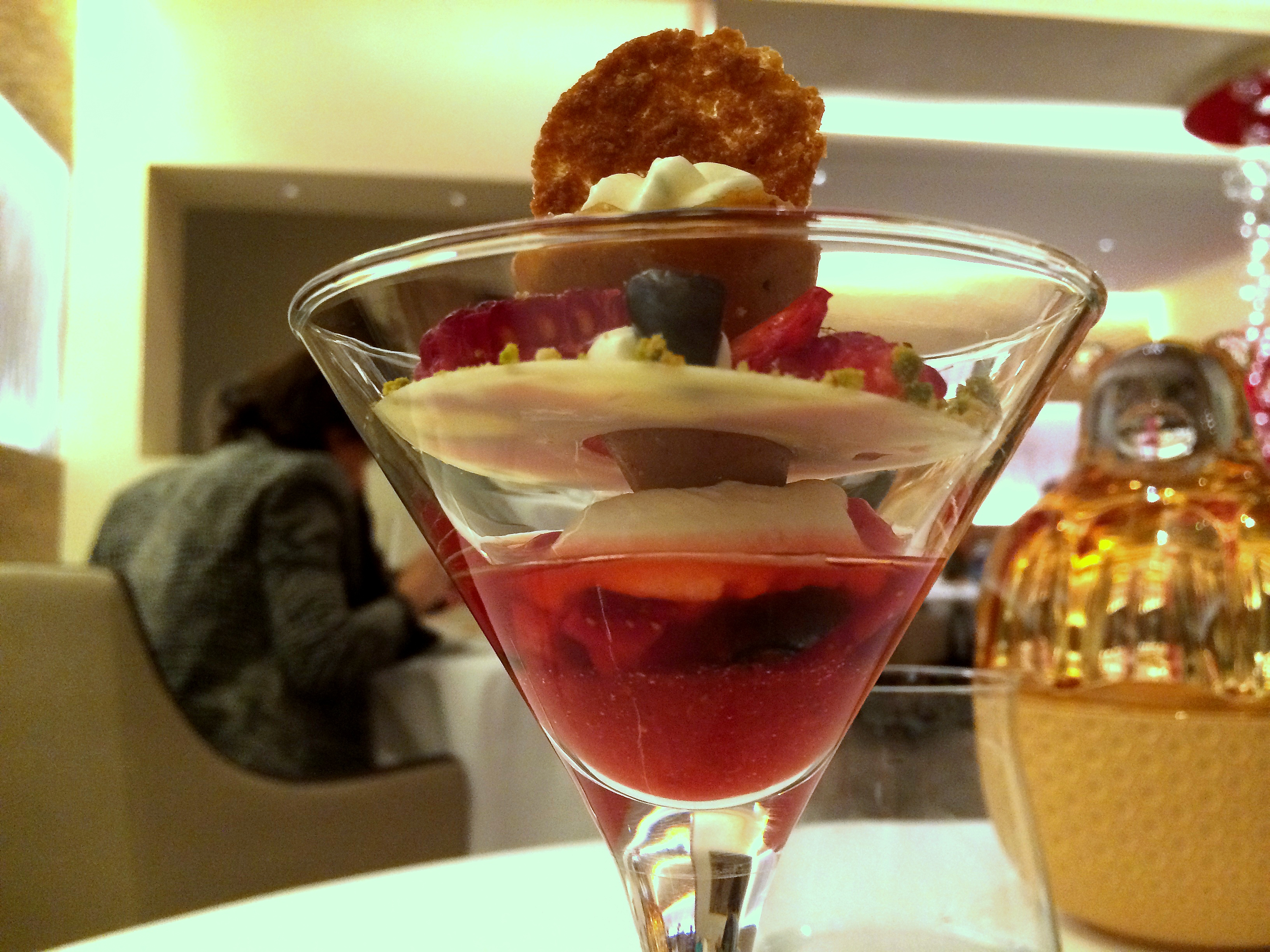
Structure en équilibre

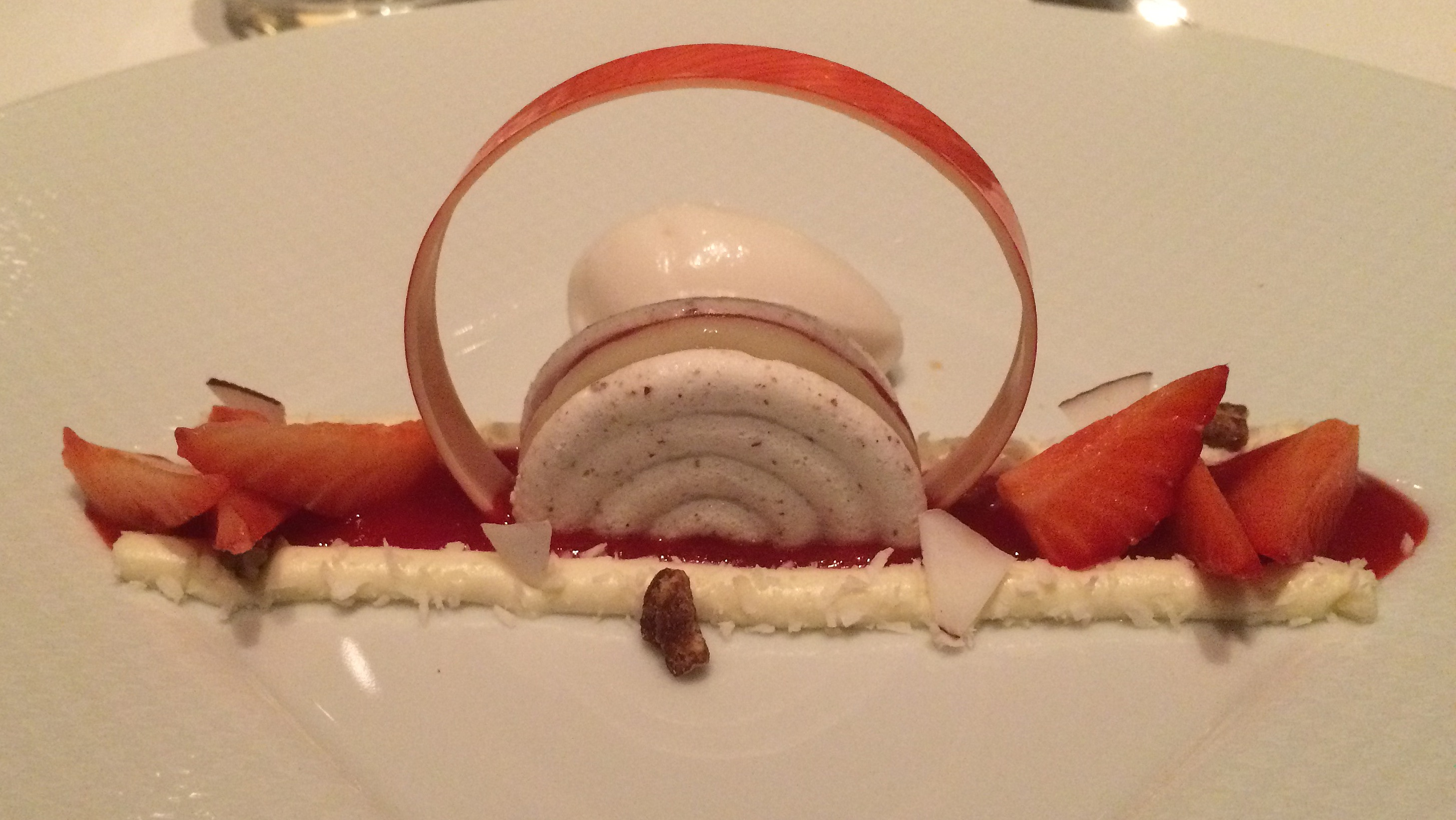
Éclat de joies

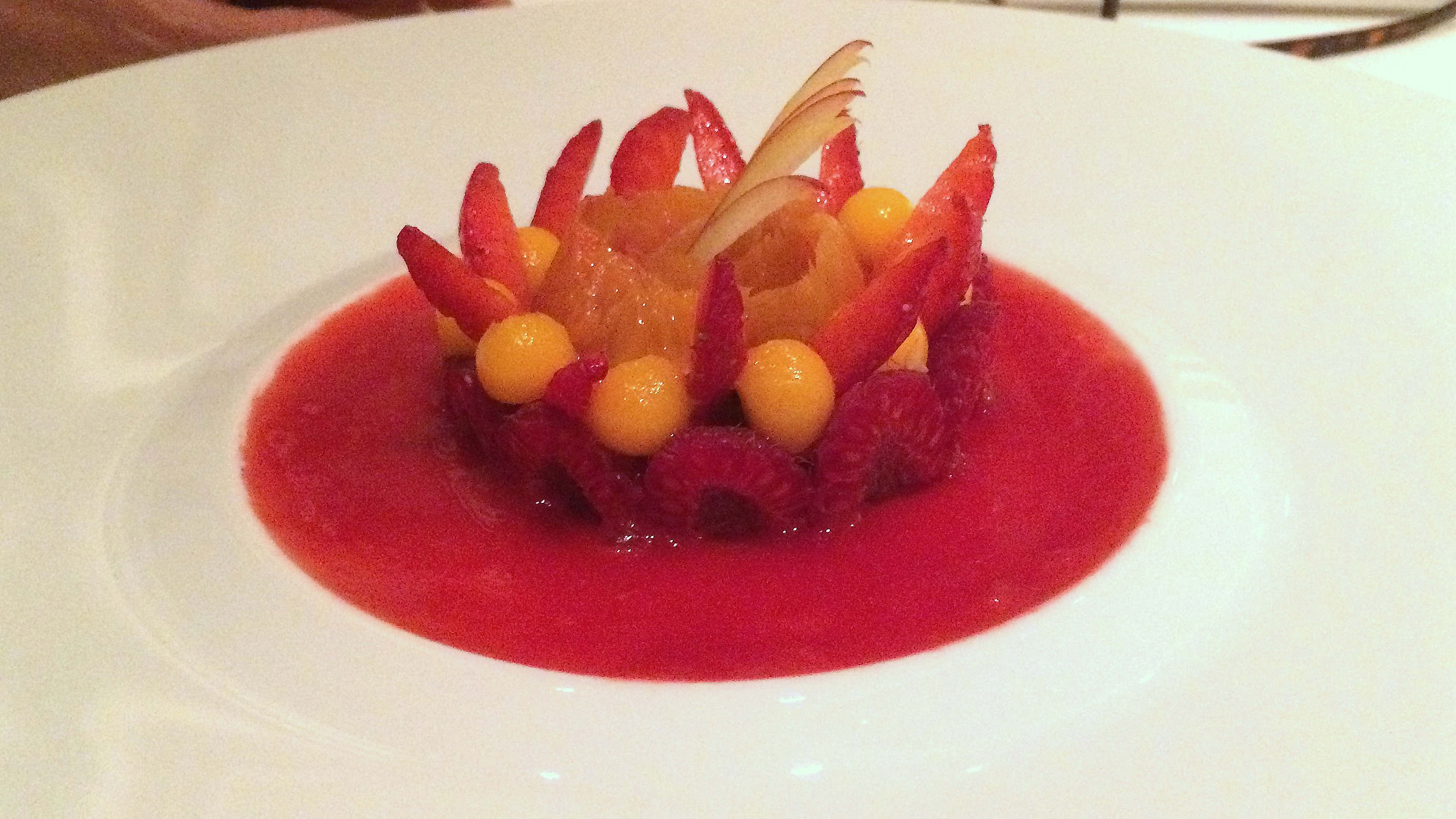
Bouquet d'amour
