= Fernand Tardy =

French politician

- Born: 14 June 1919; Versailles, France
- Died: 4 April 2017 (aged 97)
- Occupation: Politician

Fernand Tardy (14 June 1919 – 4 April 2017) was a French politician. He served as a member of the French Senate from 1980 to 1998, representing the Alpes-de-Haute-Provence.

== Early life ==
Fernand Tardy was born on 14 June 1919 in Versailles near Paris. He served in the French Army during World War II, and he joined the French Resistance in 1942.

== Career ==
Tardy served as the mayor of Thoard from 1956 to 1990, and as a senator for Alpes-de-Haute-Provence from 1980 to 1998.

Tardy was the author of two books.

== Death ==
Tardy died on 4 April 2017, at the age of 97.

== Works ==
- Tardy, Fernand (1990). Bonsoir, petite princesse bleue : secteur de Digne de L'Armee secrete, sous - secteur de Thoard. Le Chaffaut-Saint-Jurson: Terradou. OCLC 145030530.
- Tardy, Fernand (2007). Vésian, Hélène (ed.). Un siècle, une vie. Château-Arnoux: Imprimerie Vial. ISBN 9782953056303.
