= Thibaut Cuisset =

French photographer

Thomas Cuisset
- Born: 19 March 1958; Maubeuge, Nord, France
- Died: 19 January 2017 (aged 58); Villejuif, Val-de-Marne, France
- Occupation: Photographer

Thomas Cuisset (March 19, 1958 – January 19, 2017) was a French photographer. He was a resident artist at the Villa Medici in 1992. He won the Prix Moins Trente in 1987, and the Prix de photographie from the Académie des Beaux-Arts in 2009.
