= Annie Saumont =

Annie Saumont (1927 – 31 January 2017) was a French short story writer and English to French translator.

Saumont started as a specialist in English literature and an English to French translator. She has translated books by V.S. Naipaul, Nadine Gordimer and John Fowles among others.

Saumont is best known for her many collections of short stories. She published books of short stories over a period of over thirty years, and won a number of prizes for her work, including the 1981 Prix Goncourt de la Nouvelle for Quelquefois dans les cérémonies, the 1989 SGDL Short Story prize for Je suis pas un camion, and the 1993 Renaissance Short Story Prize for Les voilà quel bonheur.

== Bibliography ==
Short Stories

- La vie à l'endroit, Mercure de France, 1969
- Enseigne pour une école de monstres, Gallimard, 1977
- Dieu regarde et se tait, Gallimard, 1979, H.B. Éditions, 2000
- Quelquefois dans les cérémonies, Gallimard, 1981.
- Si on les tuait ?, Luneau-Ascot, 1984, Julliard, 1994
- Il n'y a pas de musique des sphères, Luneau-Ascot, 1985
- La terre est à nous, Ramsay, 1987, Gallimard, 1999, Julliard, 2009,
- Je suis pas un camion, Seghers, 1989. Prix SGDL de la nouvelle. Julliard, 1996. Pocket, 2000.
- Moi les enfants j'aime pas tellement, Syros, 1990. Julliard, 2001. Pocket, 2003.
- Quelque chose de la vie, Seghers, 1990, Julliard, 2000
- Les voilà, quel bonheur, Julliard, 1993.
- Le lait est un liquide blanc, Atelier Julliard, 1995. Julliard, 2002.
- Après, Juillard, 1996. Pocket, 1998.
- Embrassons-nous, Julliard, 1998, Pocket 1999.
- Noir comme d'habitude, Julliard, 2000. Pocket, 2002.
- C'est rien, ça va passer, Julliard, 2002. Prix des Editeurs. Pocket, 2004.
- Les derniers jours heureux, Joëlle Losfeld, 2002.
- Aldo, mon ami, Flammarion, 2002
- Un soir, à la maison, Julliard, 2003.
- Les blés suivi de Pour Marie, Joëlle Losfeld, 2003.
- Nabiroga suivi de Le trou, Joëlle Losfeld, 2004.
- Un pique-nique en Lorraine, Joëlle Losfeld, 2005.
- La guerre est déclarée et autres nouvelles, 2005.
- koman sa sécri émé, Julliard 2005
- Un mariage en hiver, Éditions du Chemin de fer, 2005.
- Qu'est-ce qu'il y a dans la rue qui t'intéresse tellement ?, Joëlle Losfeld, 2006.
- Vous descendrez à l'arrêt Roussillon, Bleu autour, 2007.
- La rivière, vu par Anne Laure Sacriste, Éditions du Chemin de fer, 2007.
- Gammes, Joëlle Losfeld, 2008.
- Les croissants du dimanche, Julliard, 2008. Pocket, 2010.
- Une voiture blanche, Bleu autour, 2008.
- Autrefois le mois dernier, vu par documentation céline duval, Éditions du Chemin de fer, 2009
- Encore une belle journée, Julliard, 2010. Pocket, 2011.
- Le tapis du salon, Julliard, 2012
- Le pont, vu par Philippe Lemaire, Éditions du Chemin de fer, 2012

English to French Translations

- V.S. Naipaul, Guerilleros trans by Annie Saumont (France loisirs, 1981)
- V.S. Naipaul, Dis-moi qui tuer trans by Annie Saumont (Albin Michel, 1983)
- Nadine Gordimer, Ceux de July (July's People, 1981) trans by Annie Saumont (Albin Michel, 1983)
- V.S. Naipaul, Mr. Stone trans by Annie Saumont (Albin Michel, 1985)
- John Fowles, La Creature trans by Annie Saumont (Albin Michel, 1987)
- John Fowles, La Tour d'ébène trans by Annie Saumont (Albin Michel, 1988)
- J D Salinger, L'Attrape-Coeurs trans by Annie Saumont (Robert Laffont, 1986, 2004)
- John Fowles, Le Mage trans by Annie Saumont (Albin Michel, 2006)
