= Robert Vallée =

French cyberneticist and mathematician

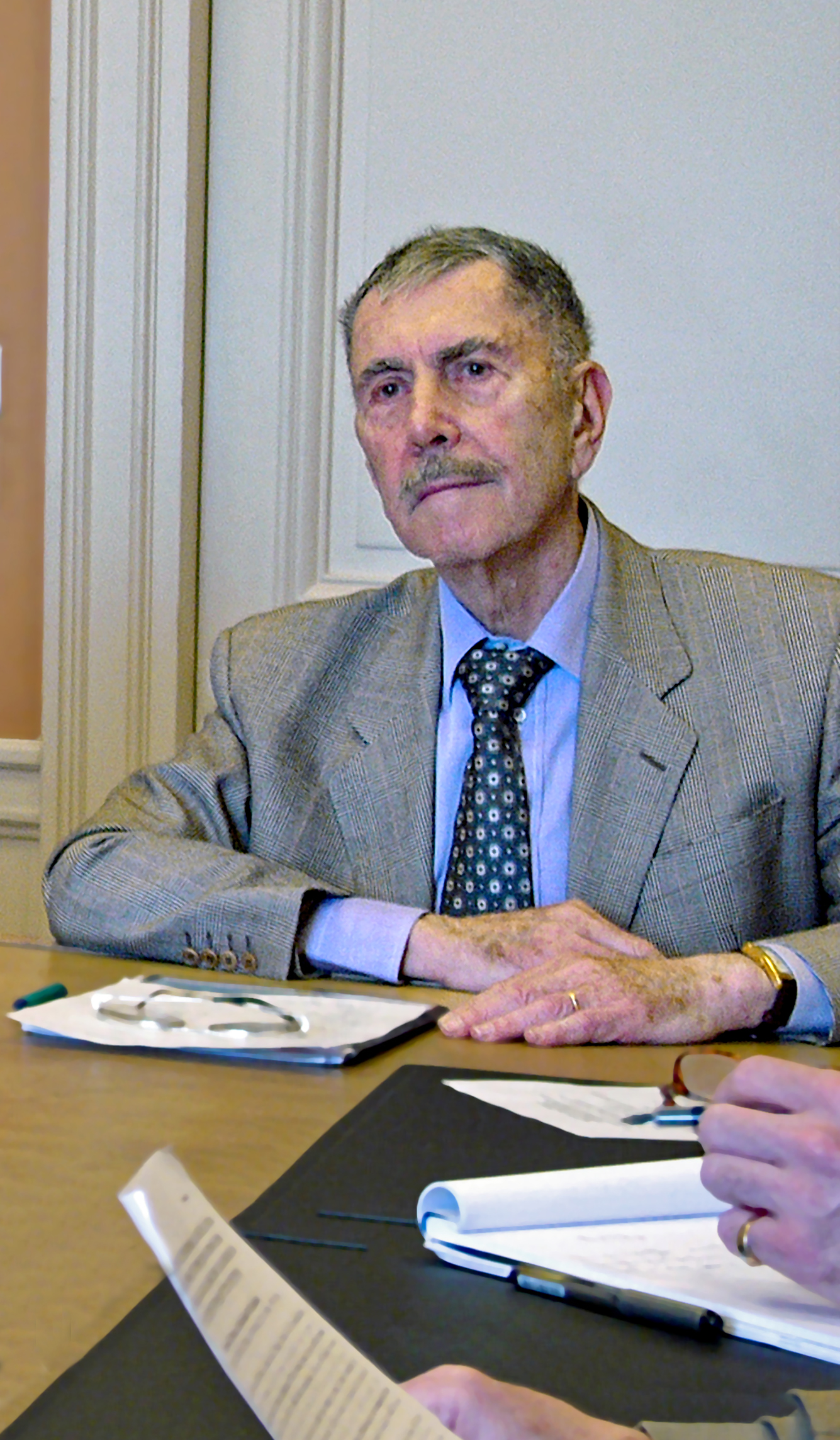
- Robert Vallée in 2005
- Born: October 5, 1922; Poitiers
- Died: January 1, 2017 (aged 94); Paris
- Citizenship: France
- Spouse: Nicole Georges-Lévy
- Scientific career
- Fields: Cybernetics, Mathematics

Robert Vallée (5 October 1922 in Poitiers, France – 1 January 2017, Paris, France) was a French cyberneticist and mathematician. He was Professor at the Paris 13 University (University of Paris-Nord) and president of the World Organization of Systems and Cybernetics (WOSC).

At the beginning of the 1950s, Vallée wrote his first publications on what he named "opérateur d'observation" (which means in English "operator of observation"). The latter, in the simplest case, allows a cybernetic system to observe the state of its environment and itself. Thereafter, on the basis of these results, a decisional operator will be able to indicate the action to be taken. The two stages of perception and decision are distinguished by "intellectual convenience", but it is interesting to gather them into a unique operator, known as "pragmatic". A decision is influenced by the observation of events, but also by past perceptions. That means that, in the observation made at a given moment, traces of past observations are also present. Eventually, these processes follow one another in a loop. Vallée defined the study of this situation with the term "epistemo-praxeology", underlining the existing link between knowledge (episteme), resulting from observation, and action (praxis). Regarding the observation problem, Vallée was also interested in information theory.

Vallée also nourished private interests in sociological problems as well as in history. The first led him to describe a cybernetic creature covering the whole surface of the globe with its communication net (1952), an idea which has also been proposed (under the name of "cybionte", 1975) by Joël de Rosnay. He also wrote articles devoted to historical aspects of cybernetics and systems, referring to René Descartes, Louis de Broglie, and Norbert Wiener.

== Biography ==
Vallée was born on 5 October 1922, in Poitiers, (France), as the son of professors in history. In 1969 he married the editor and translator Nicole Georges-Lévy. With his wife, Robert Vallée contributed to a translation, in French, of Norbert Wiener's book, Cybernetics: Or Control and Communication in the Animal and the Machine.

Towards the end of the 1920s and during the 1930s, Vallée attended the college of Angoulême where, in 1940, he obtained a bachelor's degree in Latin-Greek, mathematics, and philosophy. Between 1944 and 1946, he was a student at the École Polytechnique in Paris. During the summer of 1954, he took part in the "Foreign Students Summer Project" of the Massachusetts Institute of Technology (with Norbert Wiener and Armand Siegel). In 1961 he became a Doctor of Science in mathematics with a thesis on an extension of the general relativity of Kaluza-Klein, under the direction of André Lichnerowicz (University of Paris).

During his career, Vallée occupied several positions. Between 1956 and 1958, he was Associate-Director of the Institute Blaise Pascal in Paris. From 1961 to 1971, he was university lecturer in mathematics at the École Polytechnique and at the University of Franche-Comté (1962–1971) where he subsequently became Professor. Between 1971 and 1987 he was a Professor at the University of Paris-Nord where he was also dean of the Faculty of Economics from 1973 to 1975 and president of the Department of Economical mathematics from 1975 to 1987. In 1987, the University of Paris-Nord conferred on him the title of professor emeritus. Vallée also gave a doctoral course on dynamic systems at the University of Paris 1 Pantheon-Sorbonne between 1975 and 1987.

Vallée was active within several associations and organizations, in particular:

- Founder of the Cercle d’Etudes Cybernétiques (President Louis de Broglie), 1950.
- Member of the Council of the Société Mathématique de France, 1964–1967.
- General Director of the Institut de Sciences Mathématiques et Economiques Appliquées (President François Perroux), 1980–1982.
- President of the Collège de Systémique de l'Association Française pour la Cybernétique Economique et Technique (AFCET), 1981–1984.
- Member of the council of the French Association of Theoretical Biology, 1984–1988.
- Representative of the AFCET, (later CET), at the International Federation for Systems Research (IFSR), 1986.
- Participant in several Fuschl Conversations (International Systems Institute and IFSR), 1986–1996.
- General Director (1987) then President (2003) of the World Organization of Systems and Cybernetics (WOSC, founder J. Rose), 1987.
- Member of the council of the International Association of Cybernetics, 1987–2000. Member of the council of the Association Française de Science des Systèmes Cybernétiques, Cognitifs, et Techniques (AFSCET), 1999.

He also was a member of the International Society for the Systems Sciences, the American Society for Cybernetics, the Tutmonda Asocio pri Kibernetiko, Informatiko kaj Sistemiko (TAKIS), and of the international league of scientists for the use of the French language.

In his career several titles were conferred on him:

1975	Honorary Dean of the Faculty of Economics of the University of Paris-Nord.
1979	Honorary Fellow of the WOSC.
1984	Honorary president of the Collège de Systémique of the AFSCET.
1987	Medal of the Collège de Systémique of the AFSCET. Member of the Akademio Internacia of Sciencioj.
1990	Norbert Wiener Memorial Gold Medal (WOSC).
1994	Vice-president of the Cybernetics Academy Odobleja. Member of the French-speaking Academy of Engineers.
1999	Doctor honoris causa at the university of Petroşani (Romania).

From 1987 to 1999, Vallée was chief editor of the Revue Internationale de Systémique (AFCET) as well as member of the editorial boards of Kybernetes (official review of the WOSC), Economies et Sociétés (ISMEA), International Journal for Biological Systems, Cybernetics and Human Knowing, Grundlagenstudien aus Kybernetik und Geisteswissenschaft (TAKIS), Robotica, and Res-Systemica (electronic journal of the French Association of Science of Systems (AFSCET) and the European Union of Systemics).

== Notes ==
- (in French) Robert Vallée, Cognition et Système, l'Interdisciplinaire, Lyon-Limonest, 1995.
- Robert Vallée, 30th Anniversary Cyberprofile, Kybernetes, 32, 3, 2003, pp. 449–453.
- Robert Vallée. "De la connaissance à l'action, Automates Intelligents, 82" (in French).
