= Orvault =

Orvault Orvao (Gallo) Orvez (Breton)
- Commune
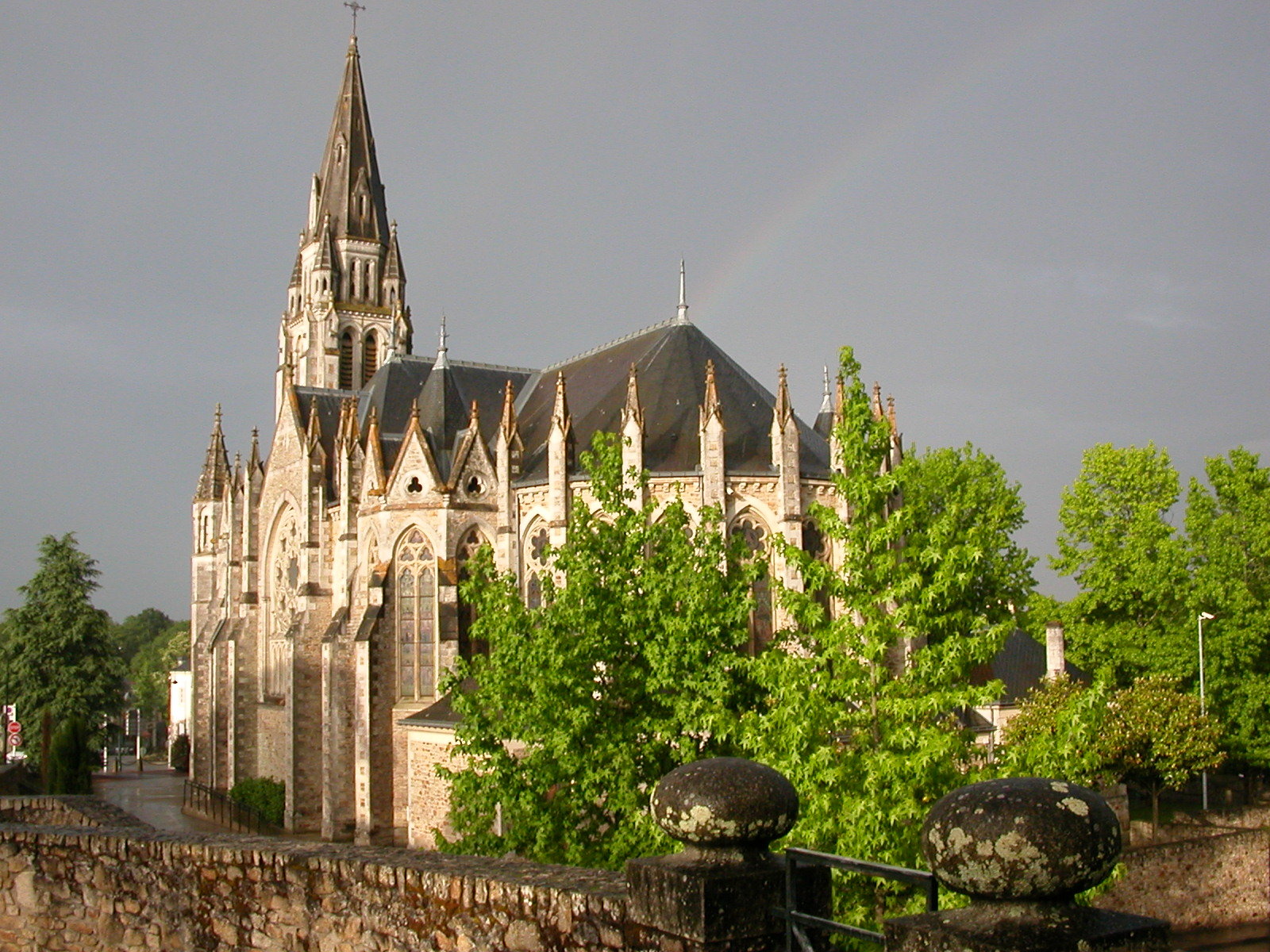

- Coat of arms
- Location of Orvault
- Location within France Location within Pays de la Loire
- Coordinates: 47°16′18″N 1°37′21″W
- Country: France
- Region: Pays de la Loire
- Department: Loire-Atlantique
- Arrondissement: Nantes
- Canton: Saint-Herblain-2
- Intercommunality: Nantes Métropole

Government
  - Mayor (2020–2026): Jean-Sébastien Guitton
- Area^{1}: 27.67 km^{2} (10.68 sq mi)
- Highest elevation: 74 m (243 ft)
- Lowest elevation: 7 m (23 ft)
- Population (2023): 28,534
  - Density: 1,031/km^{2} (2,671/sq mi)
- Time zone: UTC+01:00 (CET)
  - Summer (DST): UTC+02:00 (CEST)
- INSEE/Postal code: 44114 /44700
- ^{1} French Land Register data, which excludes lakes, ponds, glaciers > 1 km^{2} (0.386 sq mi or 247 acres) and river estuaries.

Orvault (French: [ɔʁvo]; Gallo: Orvao, Breton: Orvez) is a commune in the Loire-Atlantique department in western France.

It is the fourth-largest suburb of the city of Nantes, and is adjacent to it on the northwest.

== History ==
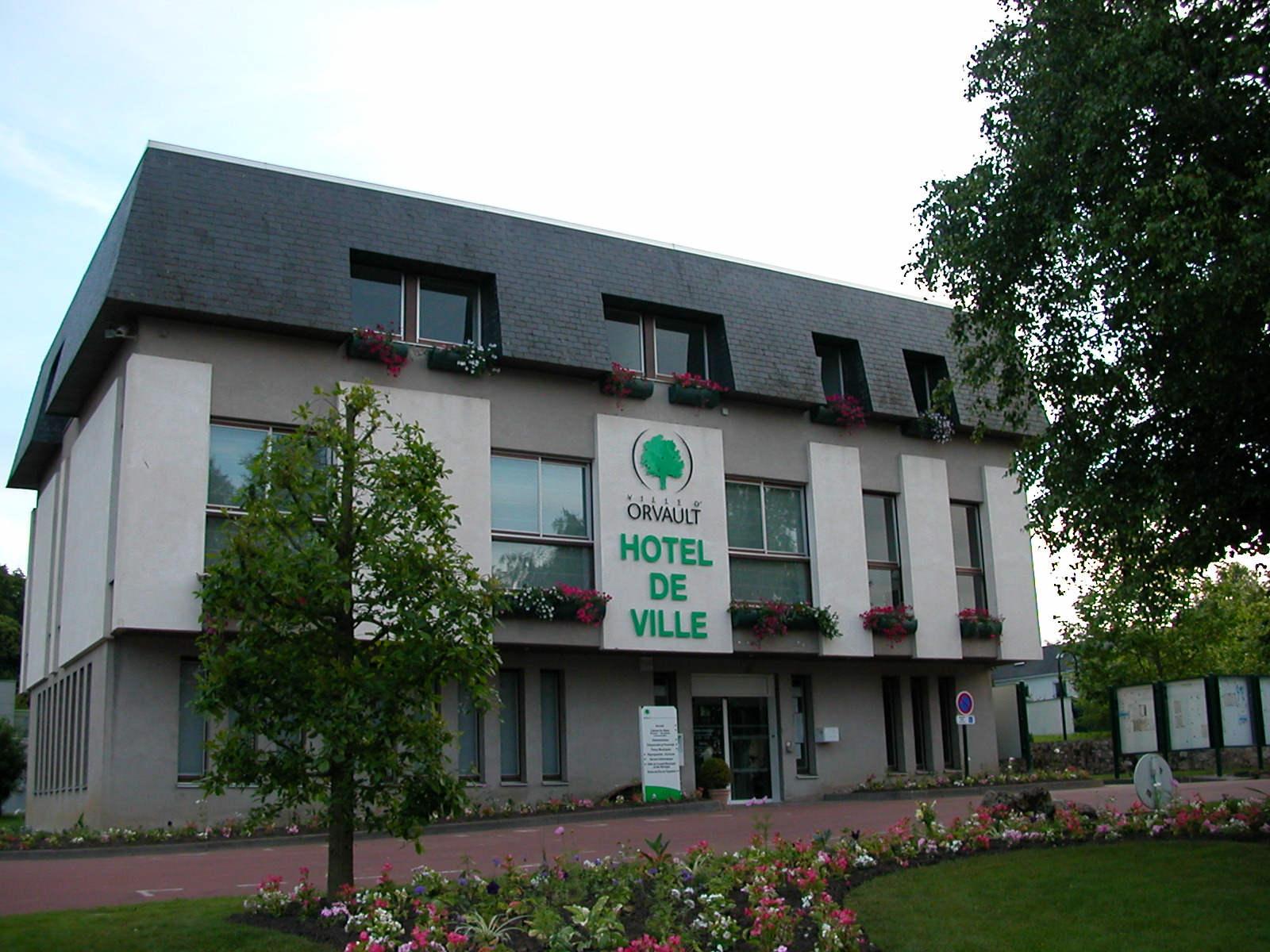
The Hôtel de Ville

The Hôtel de Ville, commissioned as an extension to the original town hall, was completed in 1976.

== Population ==
Historical population

Year	Pop.	±% p.a.
1793	1,816	—
1800	1,659	−1.28%
1806	1,920	+2.47%
1821	1,952	+0.11%
1831	1,845	−0.56%
1841	2,073	+1.17%
1846	2,142	+0.66%
1851	2,173	+0.29%
1856	2,130	−0.40%
1861	2,163	+0.31%
1866	2,196	+0.30%
1872	2,125	−0.55%
1876	2,118	−0.08%
1881	1,984	−1.30%
1886	2,010	+0.26%
1891	1,960	−0.50%
1896	1,870	−0.94%
1901	1,828	−0.45%

Year	Pop.	±% p.a.
1906	1,832	+0.04%
1911	1,875	+0.47%
1921	1,885	+0.05%
1926	2,244	+3.55%
1931	2,732	+4.01%
1936	2,924	+1.37%
1946	3,681	+2.33%
1954	3,238	−1.59%
1962	6,592	+9.29%
1968	13,510	+12.70%
1975	20,239	+5.94%
1982	23,245	+2.00%
1990	23,115	−0.07%
1999	23,554	+0.21%
2007	24,564	+0.53%
2012	24,761	+0.16%
2017	26,355	+1.26%
2023	28,534	+1.33%

Source: EHESS and INSEE (1968-2023)

== See also ==
- Communes of the Loire-Atlantique department
