= Raymond Dugrand =

- Born: 13 January 1925; Châteauroux, France
- Died: 13 February 2017 (aged 92); Montpellier, France
- Education: University of Paris
- Occupations: Geographer, urban planner
- Political party: French Communist Party

Raymond Dugrand (13 January 1925 – 13 February 2017) was a French geographer and urban planner. He was a professor of geography at the University of Montpellier, and the author of several books about the geography of the Languedoc. He was the head of urban planning for the city of Montpellier from 1977 to 2001.

== Early life ==
Raymond Dugrand was born on 13 January 1925. He joined the French Resistance in Haute-Vienne in 1943, in the midst of World War II. He joined the French Communist Party in 1945, but later became an "anti-communist". Meanwhile, he joined an underground network of activists who hid people sentenced to the death penalty.

Dugrand attended a teachers college in Châteauroux until 1945, when he enrolled at the University of Paris to study geography. He earned the agrégation in geography, followed by a doctorate in geography. His thesis supervisor was Pierre George.

== Career ==
Dugrand became a faculty member at the University of Montpellier, later known as Paul Valéry University, in 1963. He was the author of three books and the co-author of two more books on the geography of the Languedoc. He also served on the editorial board of the L’Espace géographique, an academic journal.

Upon Georges Frêche's election as the mayor of Montpellier in 1977, Dugrand became the head of urban planning for the city. He served in this capacity until 2001. During his tenure, he hired Spanish architect Ricardo Bofill to design the Antigone neighbourhood of Montpellier. He also hired architects Paul Chemetov, Robert Croizet, François Fontès, Massimiliano Fuksas, Rob Krier, Emmanuel Nebout, Jean Nouvel, Christian de Portzamparc and Jean-Michel Wilmotte to design other buildings in Montpellier.

Experimental Urban Laboratory

In the late 1980s, Dugrand set up what he called an "urban laboratory", an interdisciplinary group of geographers, architects, sociologists, and artists within Montpellier’s planning department, tasked with imagining long-term urban futures for the city. The group produced a series of speculative models, including a 50-year "green corridors" plan predicting the city’s expansion and the preservation of ecological buffers between neighbourhoods. A number of these models, once considered utopian, influenced later municipal policies on sustainable planning and public space.

Legacy

The Avenue Raymond Dugrand in Montpellier was named in his honour in 2009. According to urban historian Claire Ménard, "Dugrand's greatest achievement was his ability to make a medium-sized city think like a capital".

== Death ==
Dugrand died on 13 February 2017 in Montpellier, at the age of 92.

== Works ==
- Dugrand, Raymond (1963). Villes et campagnes en Bas-Languedoc le réseau urbain du Bas-Languedoc méditerranéen. Paris: Presses Universitaires de France. OCLC 264089768.
- Dugrand, Raymond (1964). La garrigue montpelliéraine : essai d'explication d'un paysage. Paris: Presses Universitaires de France. OCLC 487899712.
- Carrère, Paul; Dugrand, Raymond (1967). La région méditerranéenne. Paris: Presses Universitaires de France. OCLC 636647654.
- Dugrand, Raymond (1969). Atlas du Languedoc-Roussillon. Paris: Berger-Levrault. OCLC 826874.
- Dugrand, Raymond; Ferras, Robert; Joutard, Philippe (1974). Bas-Languedoc, Causses, Cévennes. Paris: Larousse. ISBN 9782030629147. OCLC 247550628.
