= 2008 in France =

- Decades: 1980s; 1990s; 2000s; 2010s; 2020s
- See also: History of France; Timeline of French history; List of years in France

This article lists events from the year 2008 in France.

== Incumbents ==
- President: Nicolas Sarkozy
- Prime Minister: François Fillon

== Events ==
- 1 January – Smoking banned in all public places (including bars and restaurants) in France.
- 2 February – Wedding of Nicolas Sarkozy and Carla Bruni.
- 9 and 16 March – Cantonal elections held.
- 12 March – Lazare Ponticelli, the country's last surviving First World War veteran, dies aged 110 – eight months before the 90th anniversary of the Armistice.
- April – The Citroën C5 sedan is launched, whilst the station wagon was launched in May.
- 1 April – 2008 French mistaken virginity case
- 1 July – France assumes the Presidency of the Council of the European Union.
- 2 July – Íngrid Betancourt and 14 other hostages are rescued from FARC by Colombian security forces.
- 13 July – First meeting of Mediterranean Union, in Paris
- 10 September – Activation of Large Hadron Collider, localized between France and Switzerland
- 4 October – 50th Anniversary of the French Constitution of 1958 (French Fifth Republic).
- 27 November – XL Airways Germany Flight 888T crashed on a Mediterranean Sea, near Canet-en-Roussillon around Perpignan, killed seven people.
- October : Françoise Barré-Sinoussi and Luc Montagnier – the 2008 Nobel Prize in Physiology or Medicine
- December: – First album of the series Je n'aime pas le classique, mais ça j'aime bien! was released
- Undated
  - Black music, des chaînes de fer aux chaînes d'or documentary film is released.
  - Yeallow, French indie rock band from Strasbourg is formed.

== Deaths ==
=== January ===
- 3 January – Henri Chopin, avant-garde poet and musician (born 1922).
- 5 January – Raymond Forni, Socialist politician (born 1941).
- 5 January – Louis Hon, soccer player (born 1924).
- 7 January – Maryvonne Dupureur, Olympic athlete (born 1937).
- 7 January – Marcel Mouly, artist (born 1918).
- 7 January – Jean-Claude Vrinat, restaurateur (born 1936).
- 12 January – Louis Alexandre Raimon, hair stylist (born 1922).
- 16 January – Raymond Cambefort, one of the last three fully verified World War I veterans living in France (born 1900).
- 16 January – Pierre Lambert, Trotskyist leader (born 1920).
- 17 January – Carlos, singer, entertainer and actor (born 1943).
- 17 January – Madeleine Milhaud, actress (born 1902).
- 20 January – Louis de Cazenave, at the time of his death, the oldest French poilu still alive (born 1897).
- 29 January – Philippe Khorsand, actor (born 1948).

=== February ===
- 2 February – Roger Testu, cartoonist (born 1913).
- 6 February – Gwenc'hlan Le Scouëzec, writer and Grand Druid of Brittany (born 1929).
- 12 February – Jean Prouff, soccer player and manager (born 1919).
- 13 February – Henri Salvador, singer (born 1917).
- 13 February – Roger Voisin, trumpeter (born 1918).
- 18 February – Alain Robbe-Grillet, writer and filmmaker (born 1922).
- 19 February – Jean-Michel Bertrand, politician (born 1943).
- 28 February – Gérard Calvet, Roman Catholic abbot (born 1927).

=== March ===
- 12 March – Lazare Ponticelli, last surviving official French veteran of the First World War (born 1897).
- 17 March – Roland Arnall, businessman and diplomat in the United States (born 1939).
- 19 March – Chantal Sébire, teacher and euthanasia campaigner (born 1955).
- 25 March – Thierry Gilardi, football and rugby commentator (born 1958).
- 26 March – Christian Bergelin, politician (born 1945).
- 27 March – Jean-Marie Balestre, sports executive (born 1921).
- 30 March – Marie-Françoise Audollent, actress (born 1943).

=== April ===
- 9 April – Jacques Morel, actor (born 1922).
- 11 April – Claude Abbes, international soccer player (born 1927).
- 17 April – Aimé Césaire, poet, author and politician (born 1913).
- 19 April – Germaine Tillion, anthropologist (born 1907).
- 20 April – Farid Chopel, actor, comedian and singer (born 1952).
- 23 April – Jean-Daniel Cadinot, film director and producer (born 1944).

=== May ===
- 9 May – Pascal Sevran, TV presenter and author (born 1945).
- 10 May – Paul Haeberlin, chef and restaurateur (born 1923).

=== June ===
- 1 June – Yves Saint Laurent, fashion designer (born 1936).
- 6 June – Paul Tessier, surgeon (born 1917).
- 11 June – Jean Desailly, actor (born 1920).
- 18 June – Jean Delannoy, actor, screenwriter and film director (born 1908).
- 26 June – Lilyan Chauvin, actress and writer (born 1925).
- 27 June – Frédéric Botton, lyricist and composer (b. c1937).
- 27 June – Raymond Lefèvre, orchestra leader, arranger and composer (born 1929).

=== July ===
- 10 July – Bernard Cahier, Formula One photo-journalist (born 1927).
- 27 July – Raymonde Allain, model and actress (born 1912).
- 28 July – Pierre Berès, bookseller and antiquarian book collector (born 1913).

=== September ===
- 17 September – Patrick Alexandroni, actor, rapper, and television producer (born 1962)

=== October ===
- 13 October – Guillaume Depardieu Actor
- 20 October – Soeur Emmanuelle

=== November ===
- 1 November – Jacques Lunis, athlete (born 1923).
- 3 November – Jean Fournet, conductor (born 1913)

== See also ==
- 2008 in French television
- List of French films of 2008
