= Eolas (disambiguation) =

Eolas is a United States research and development company and patent licensee.

Eolas may also refer to:

- Eòlas Media, a TV production company founded by Sam Maynard of Virtual Hebrides
- Maître Eolas, pseudonym of a French lawyer, who wrote about the 2008 French mistaken virginity case
