= Nikon Nikkor Z 14-30 mm f/4 S =

Nikkor Z 14-30 mm f/4 S
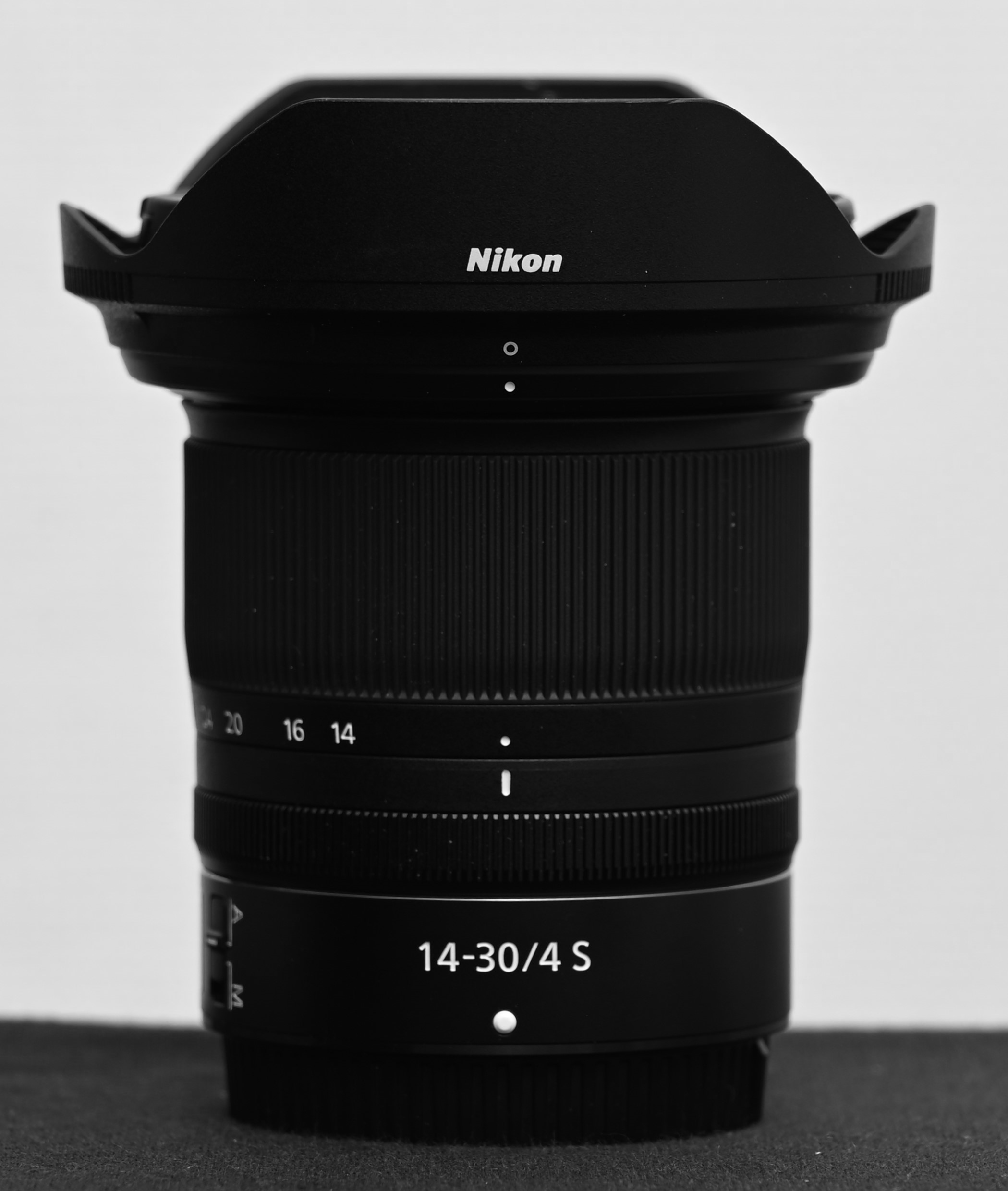
- Maker: Nikon
- Lens mount: Z-mount

Technical data
- Type: Zoom
- Focus drive: Stepping motor
- Focal length: 14-30mm
- Image format: FX (full frame)
- Aperture (max/min): f/4–22
- Close focus distance: 0.28m
- Max. magnification: 1:6.3
- Diaphragm blades: 7 (rounded)
- Construction: 14 elements in 12 groups

Features
- Lens-based stabilization: No No
- Macro capable: No No
- Unique features: S-Line lens Nano Crystal Coat elements Fluorine Coat element
- Application: Wide angle

Physical
- Max. length: 85 mm
- Diameter: 89 mm
- Weight: 485 g
- Filter diameter: 82 mm

Software
- Lens ID: 2

Accessories
- Lens hood: HB-86 (bayonet)
- Case: CL-C1

Angle of view
- Diagonal: 114°–72° (FX); 90°–50° (DX)

History
- Introduction: January 2019

Retail info
- MSRP: 1299.95 USD (as of 2019)

The Nikon Nikkor Z 14-30 mm f/4 S is a full-frame wide-angle zoom lens with a constant aperture of f/4, manufactured by Nikon for use on Nikon Z-mount mirrorless cameras.

== Introduction ==
The lens was introduced on January 8, 2019. The lens has a retractable design, making it more compact when not in use. The lens comes with a bayonet-type lens hood (HB-86).

The lens achieved a DXOMark score of 24.

== Features ==
- 14-30 mm focal length (approximately equivalent field of view of a 21-45 mm lens when used on a DX format camera)
- S-Line lens
- Autofocus using a stepping motor (STM), focus-by-wire manual focus ring
- 14 elements in 12 groups (including 4 ED glass, 4 aspherical, elements with Nano Crystal Coat and a fluorine-coated front lens element)
- 7-blade rounded diaphragm
- Internal focusing (IF lens)
- One customizable control ring (manual focusing by default, aperture, ISO and exposure compensation functions can be assigned to it)
- A/M switch for autofocus/manual focus modes
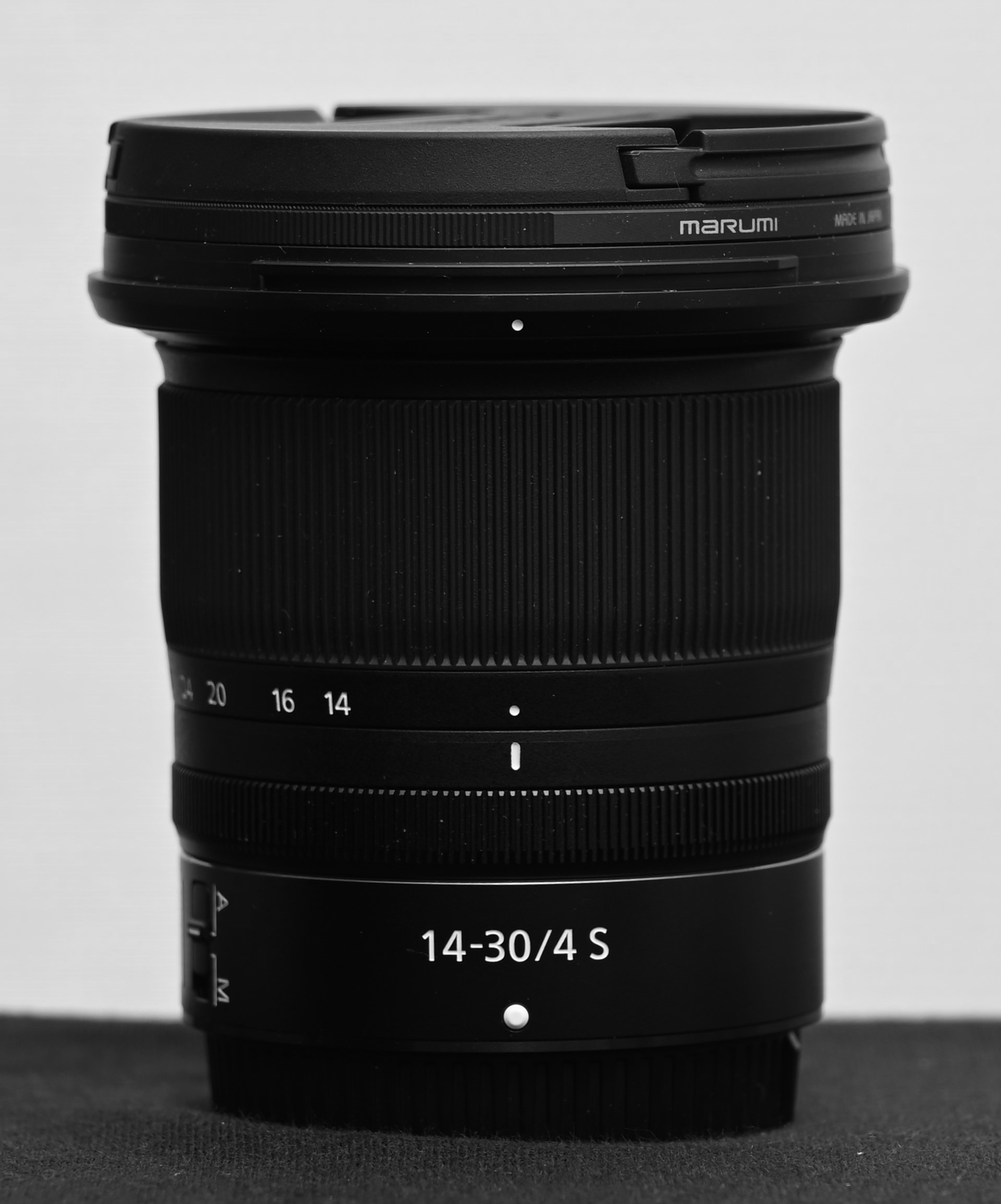
Without lens hood, with a filter attached

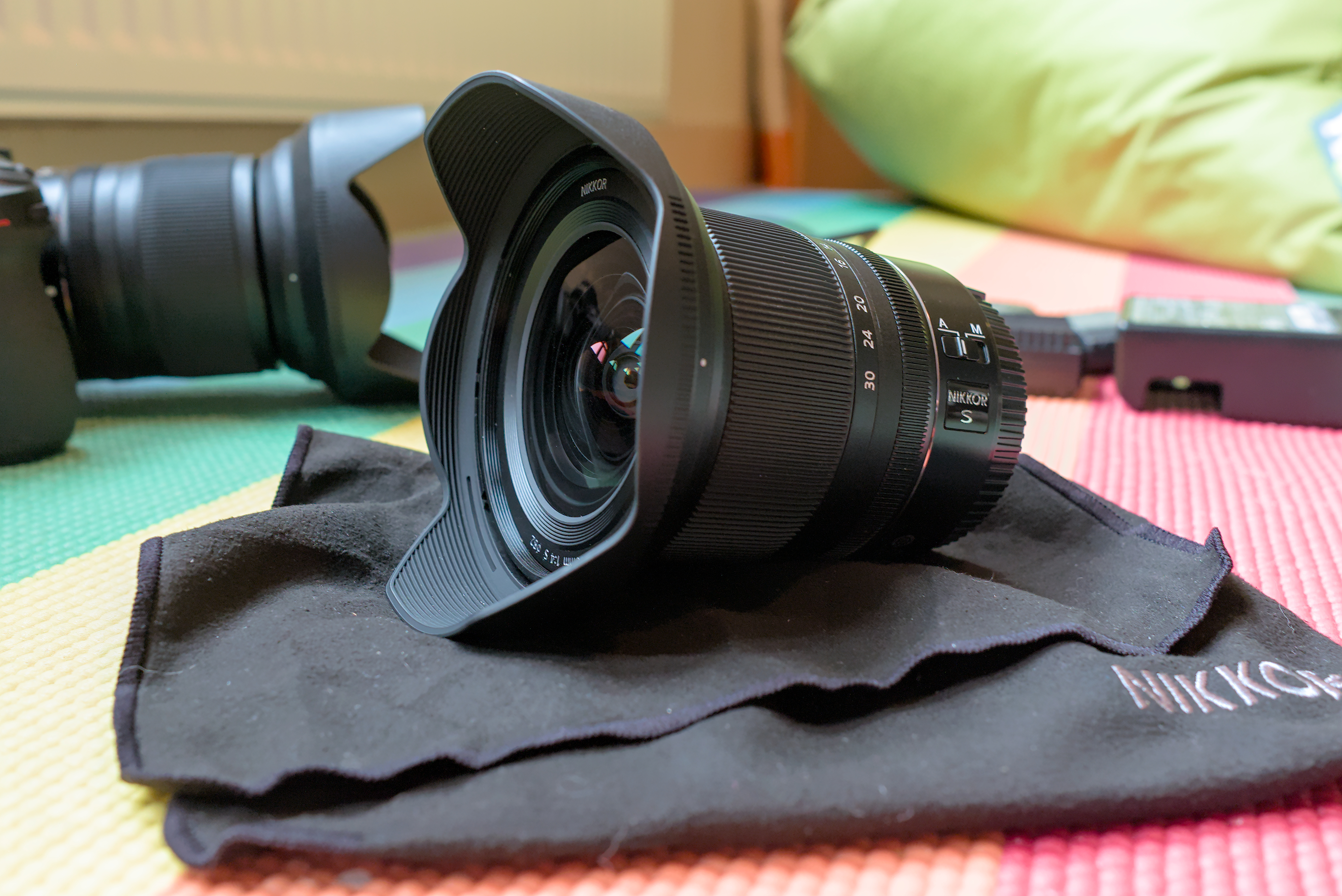

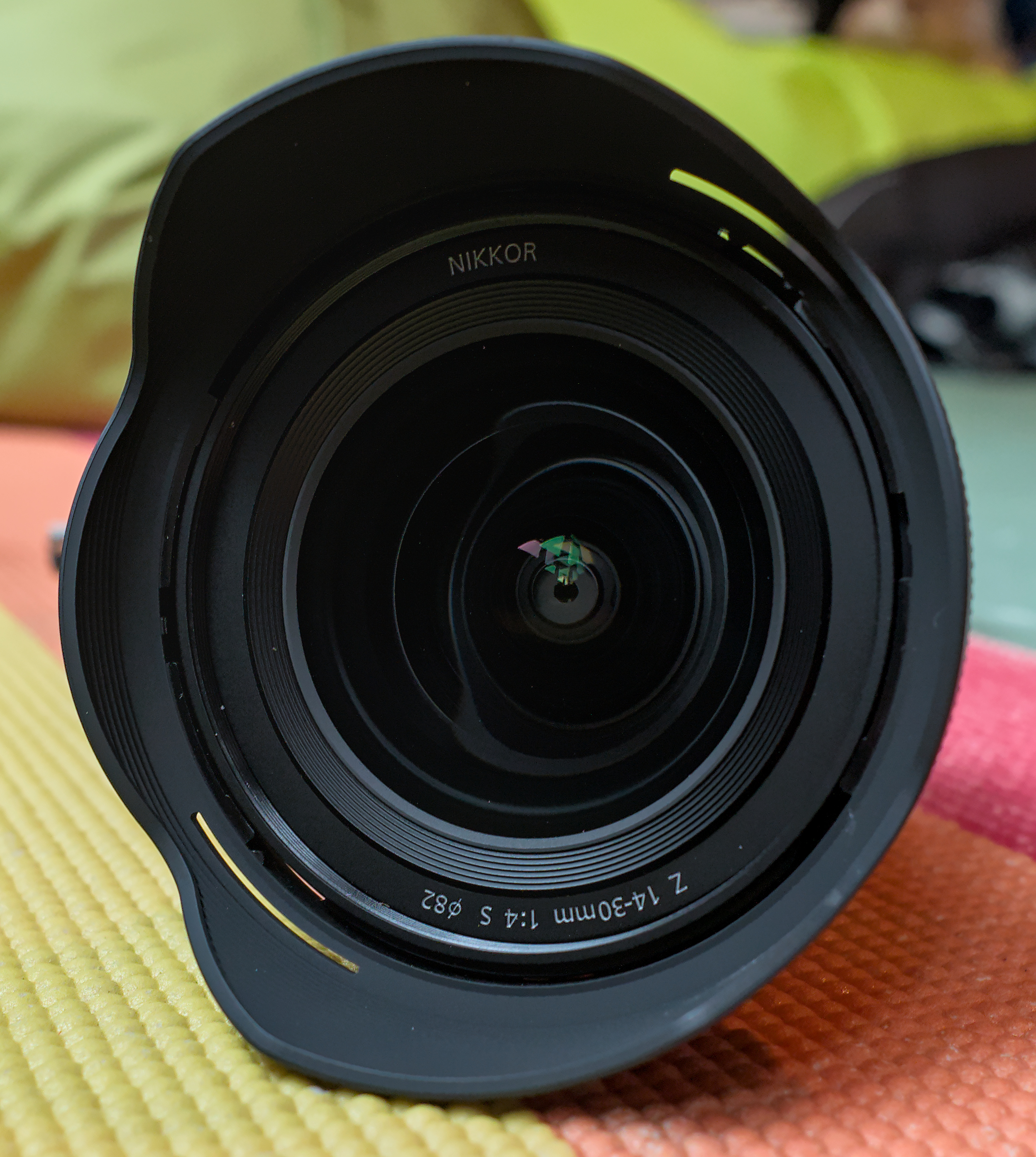
Front element

== Sample images ==
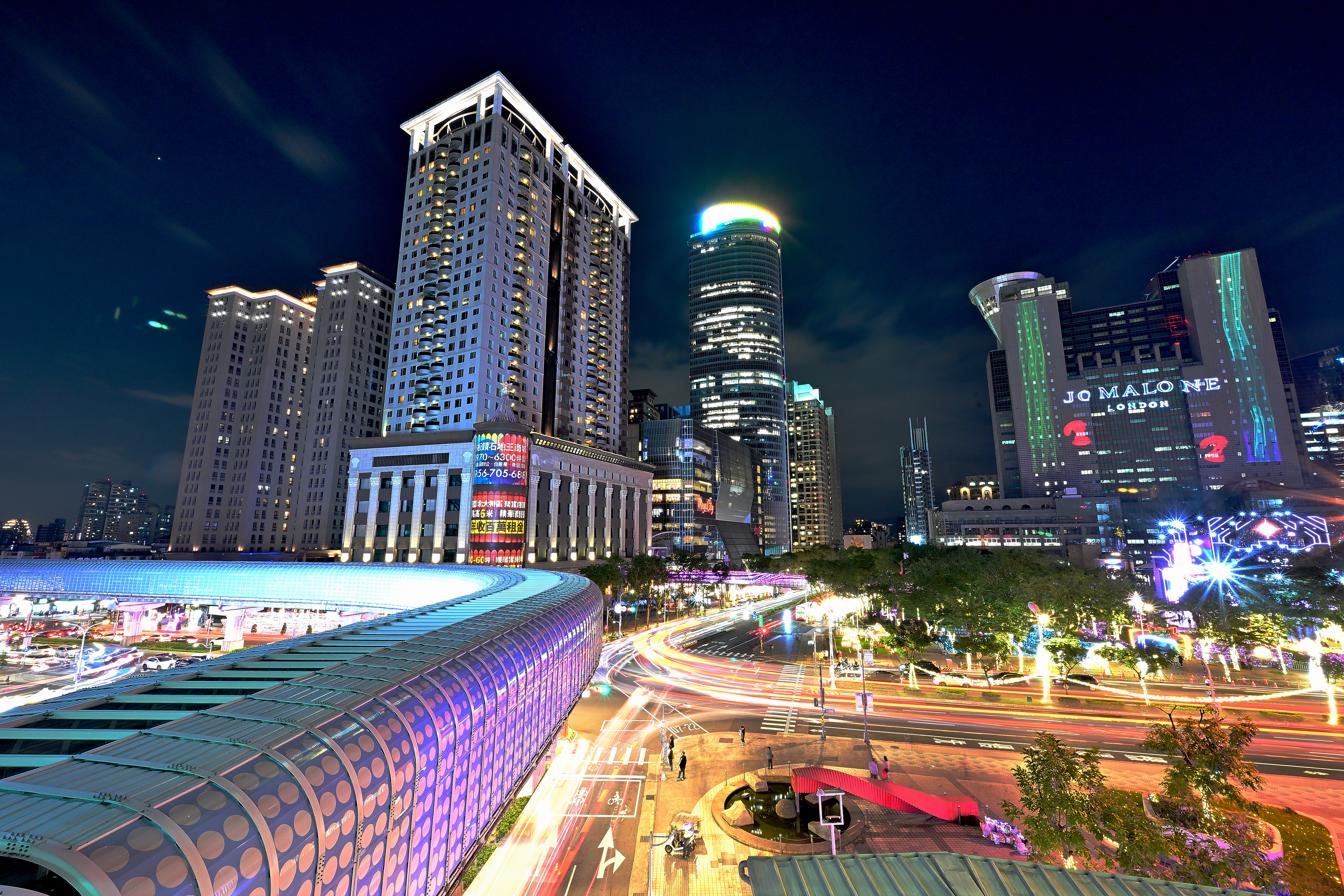
At 14 mm, f/16

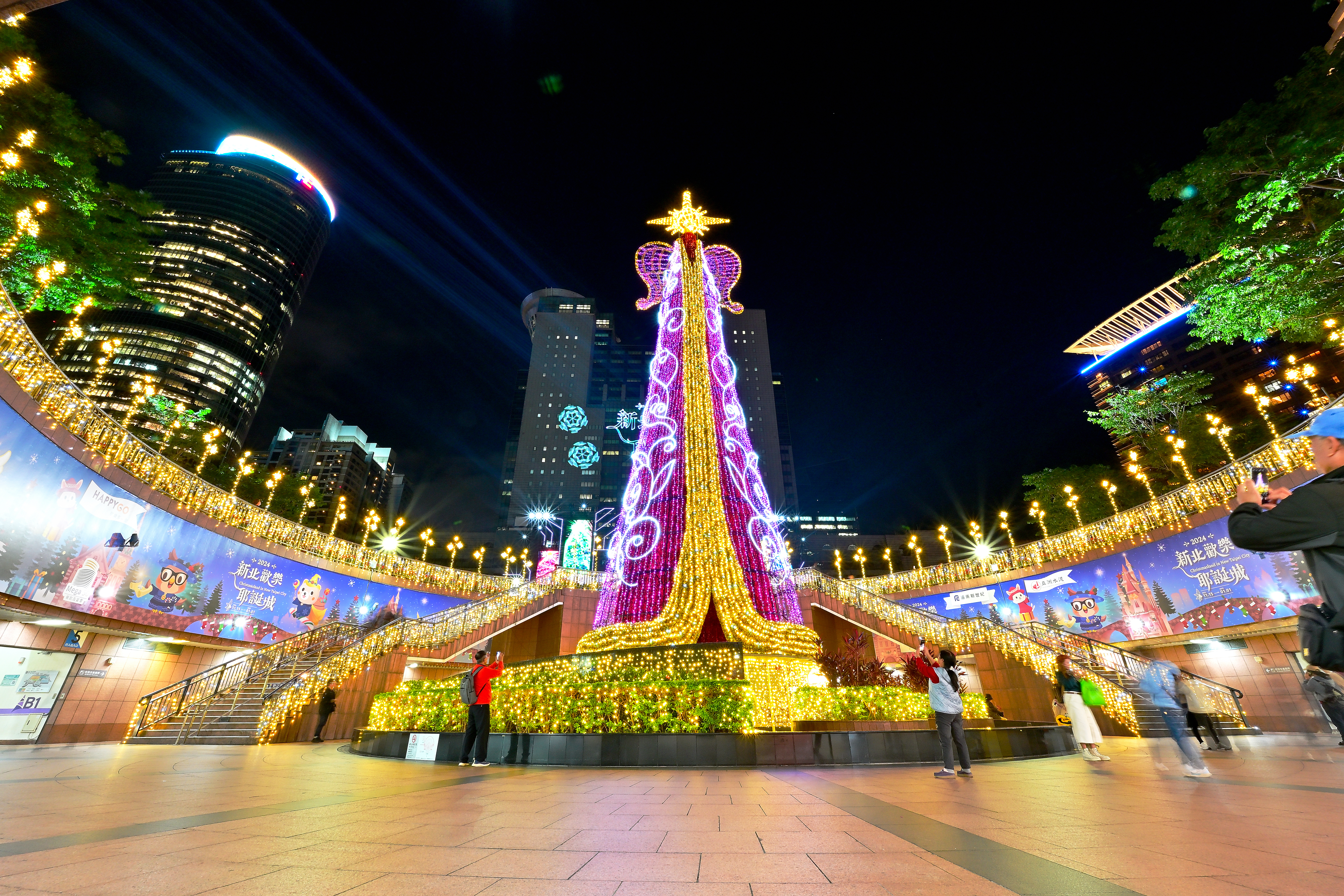
At 14 mm, f/18

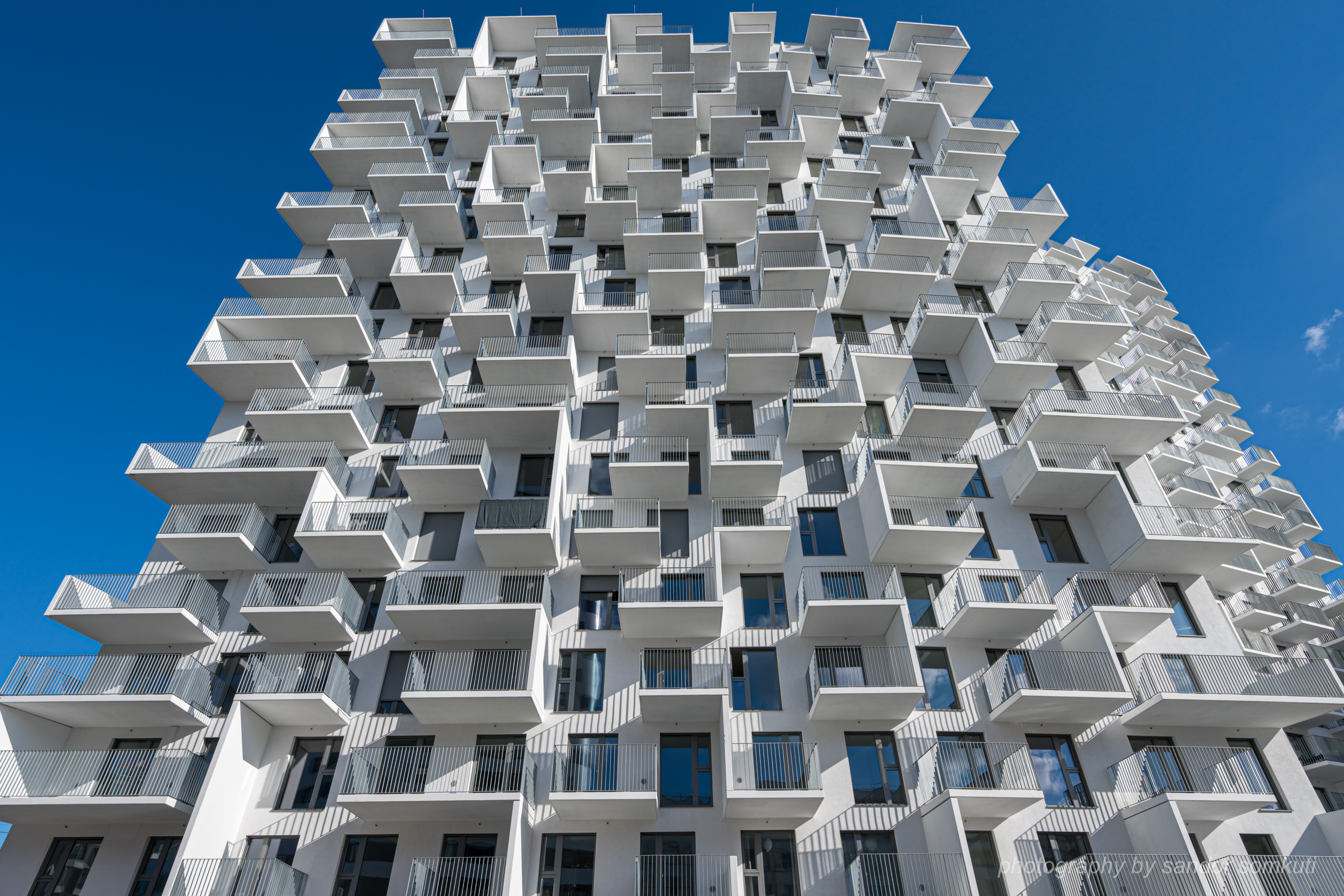
At 14 mm, f/7.1

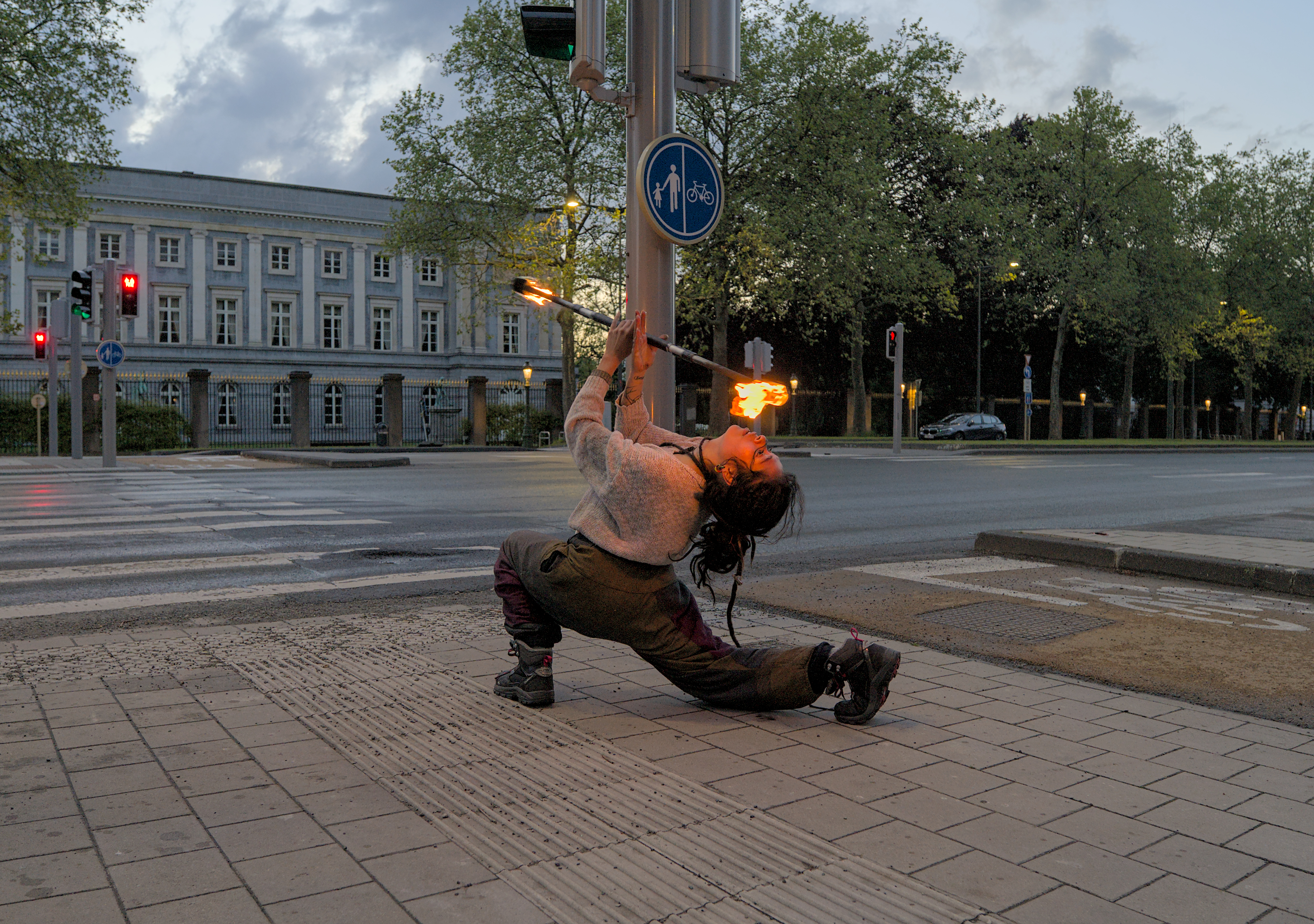
At 18.5 mm, f/4

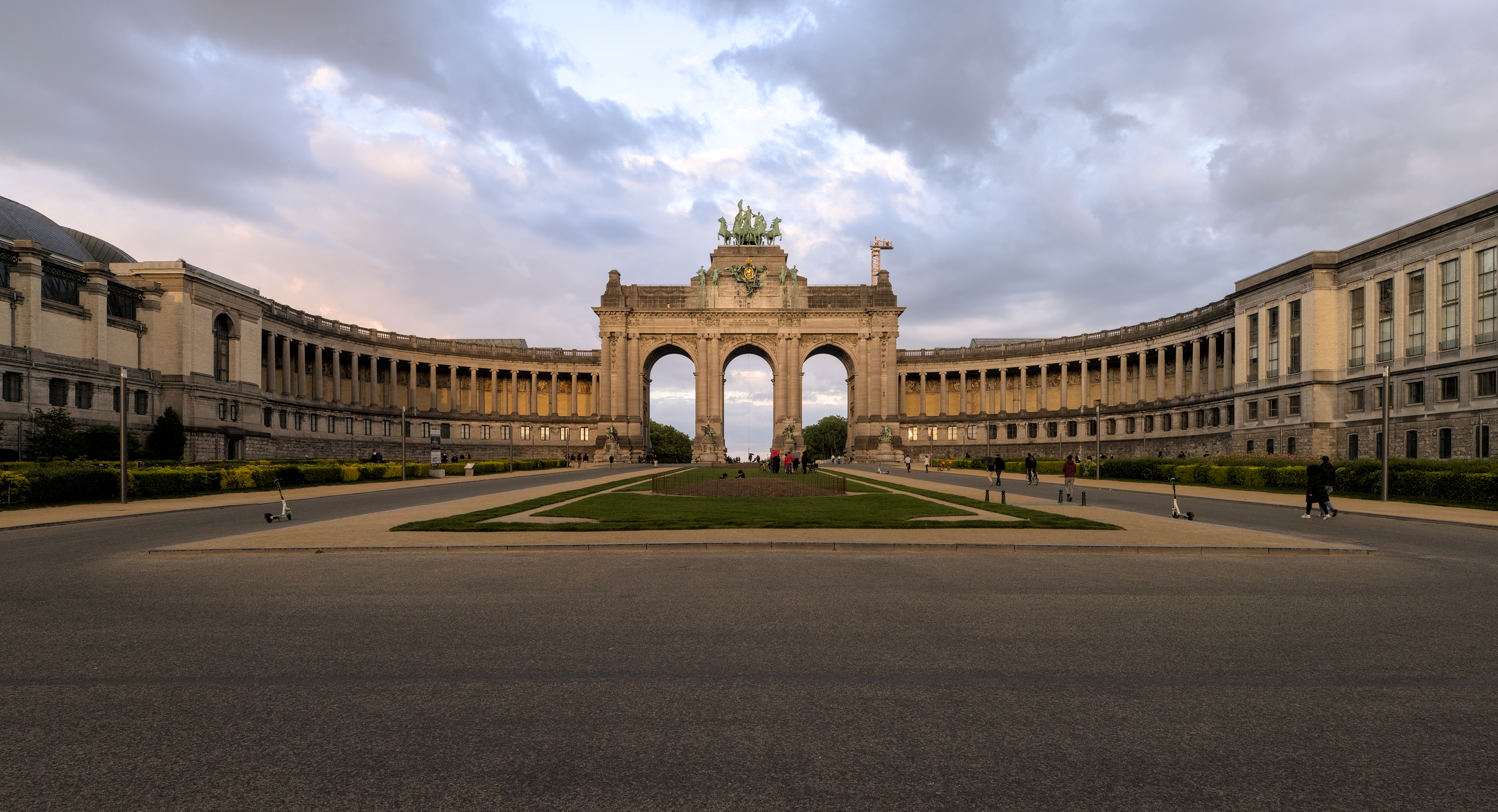
At 19 mm, f/10

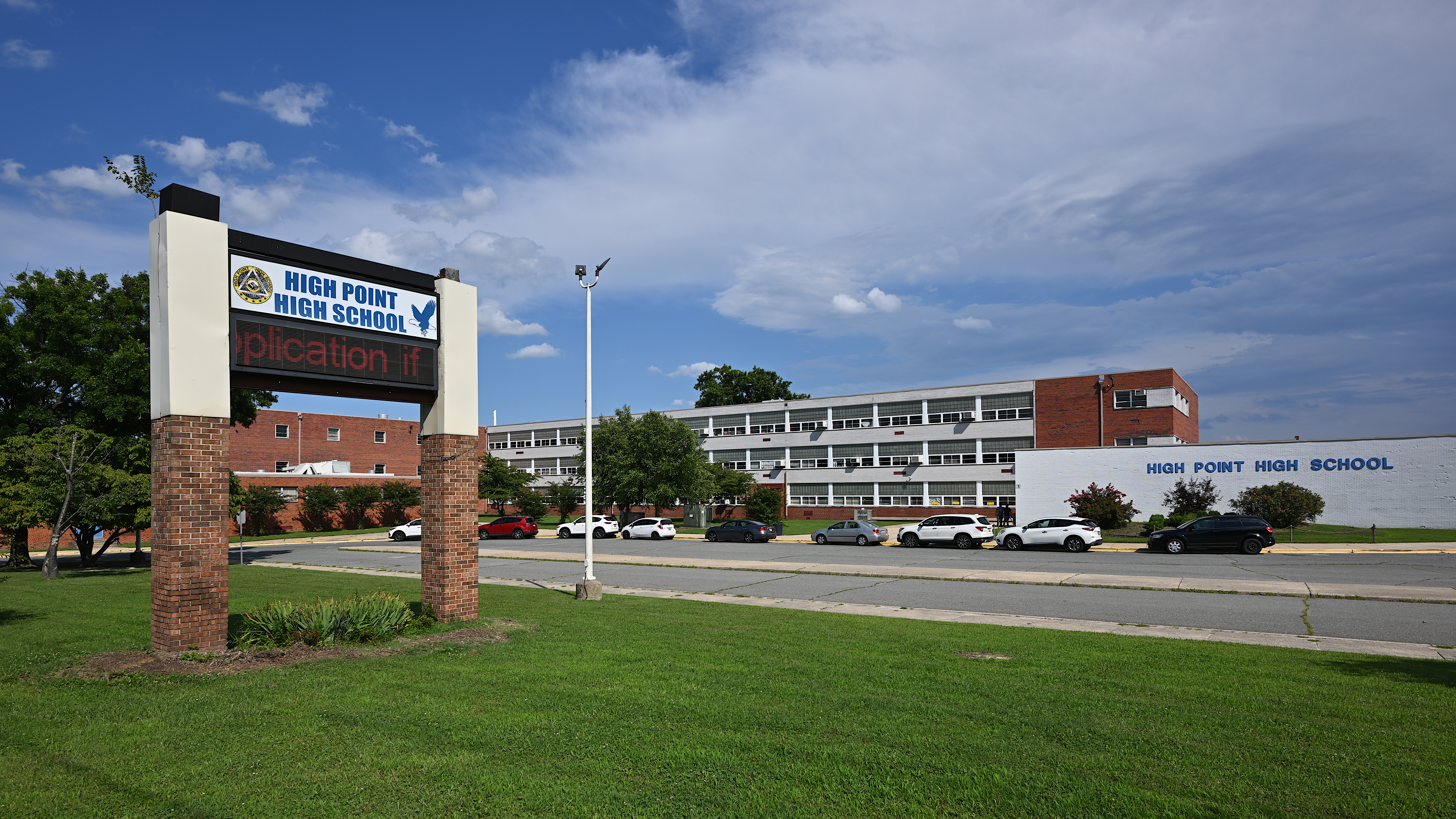
At 19 mm, f/10

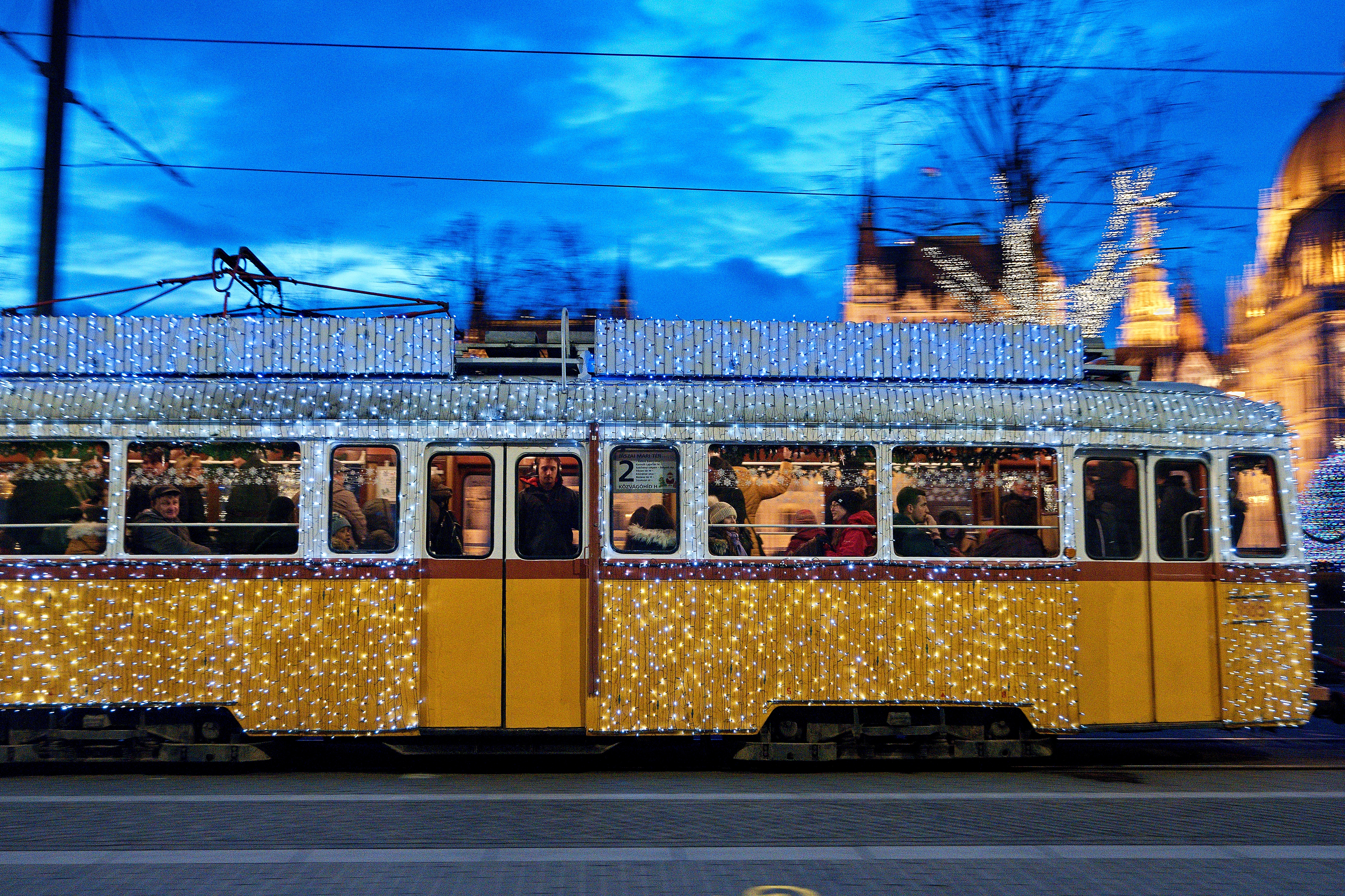
At 20.5 mm, f/4

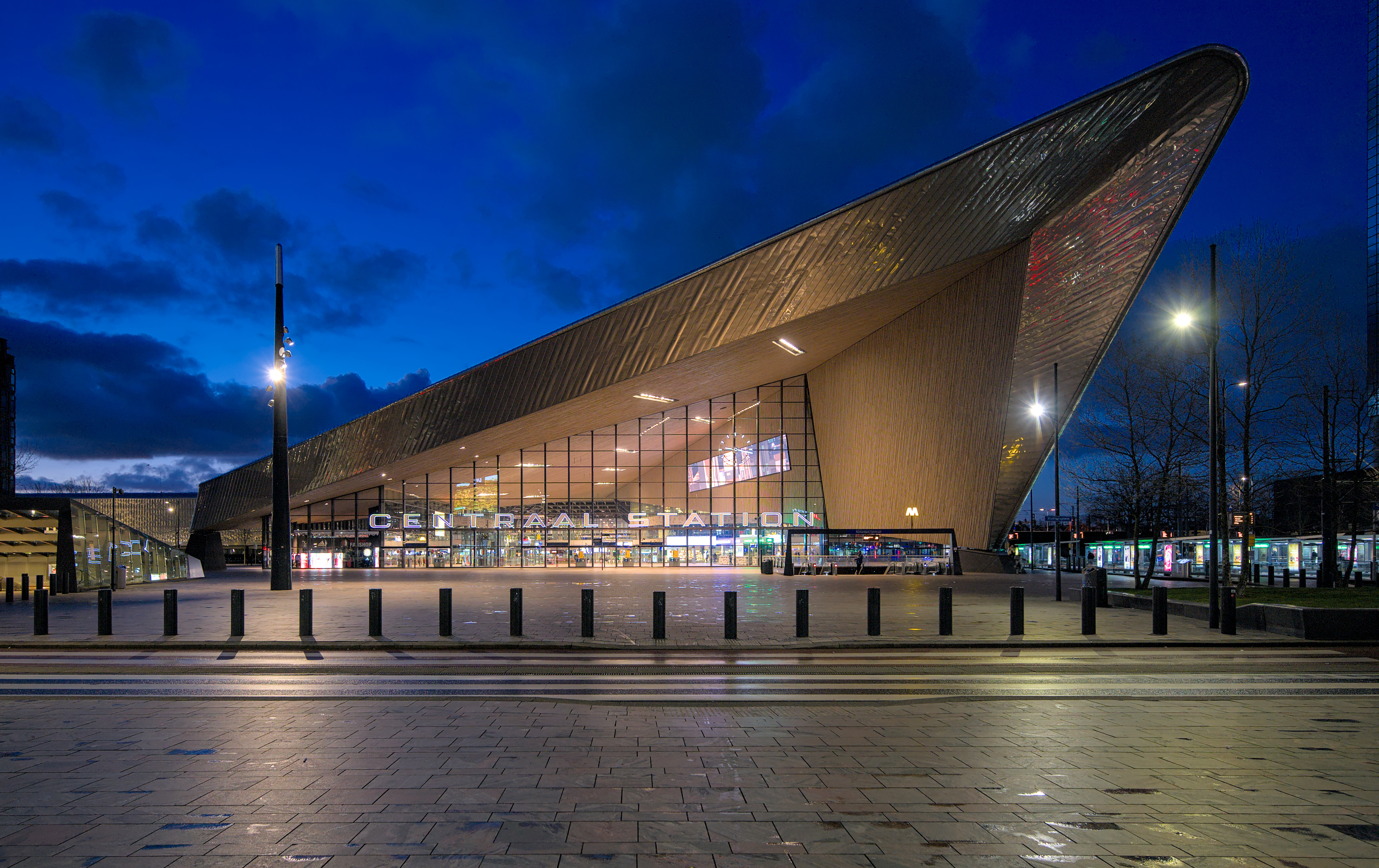
At 20.5 mm, f/4

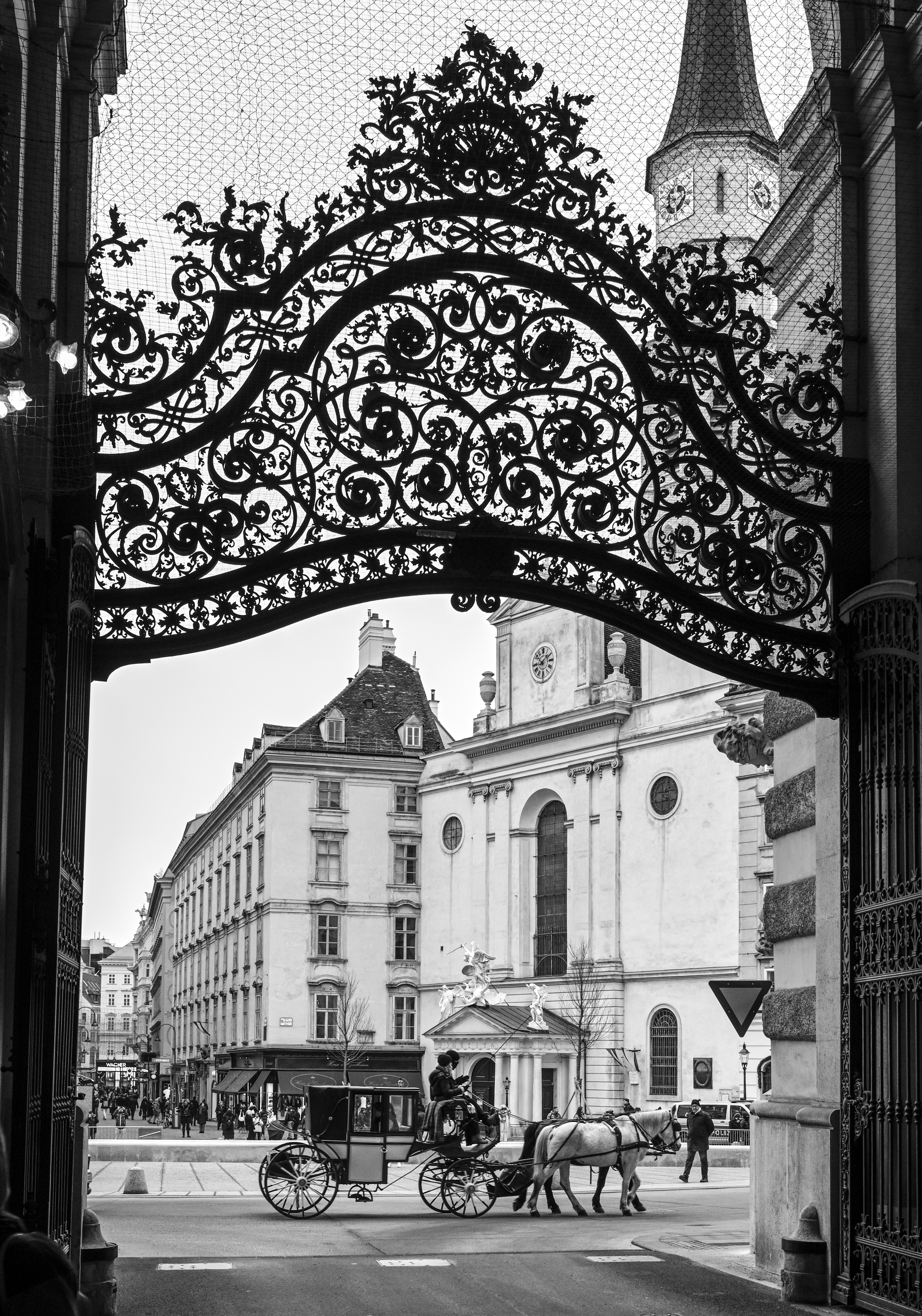
At 30 mm, f/7.1

== See also ==
- Nikon Z-mount
