= Mouly =

Mouly may refer to:

- Arnaud Mouly, French botanist whose standard author abbreviation is Mouly
- Françoise Mouly (born 1955), Paris-born French artist and designer
- Georges Mouly (1931–2019), French politician, professor, and member of the European Democratic and Social Rally group
- Ieng Mouly (born 1950), Cambodian politician
- Marcel Mouly (1918–2008), French artist who painted in an abstract style
