= Nikon Nikkor Z 70-200 mm f/2.8 VR S =

Nikkor Z 70-200 mm f/2.8 VR S
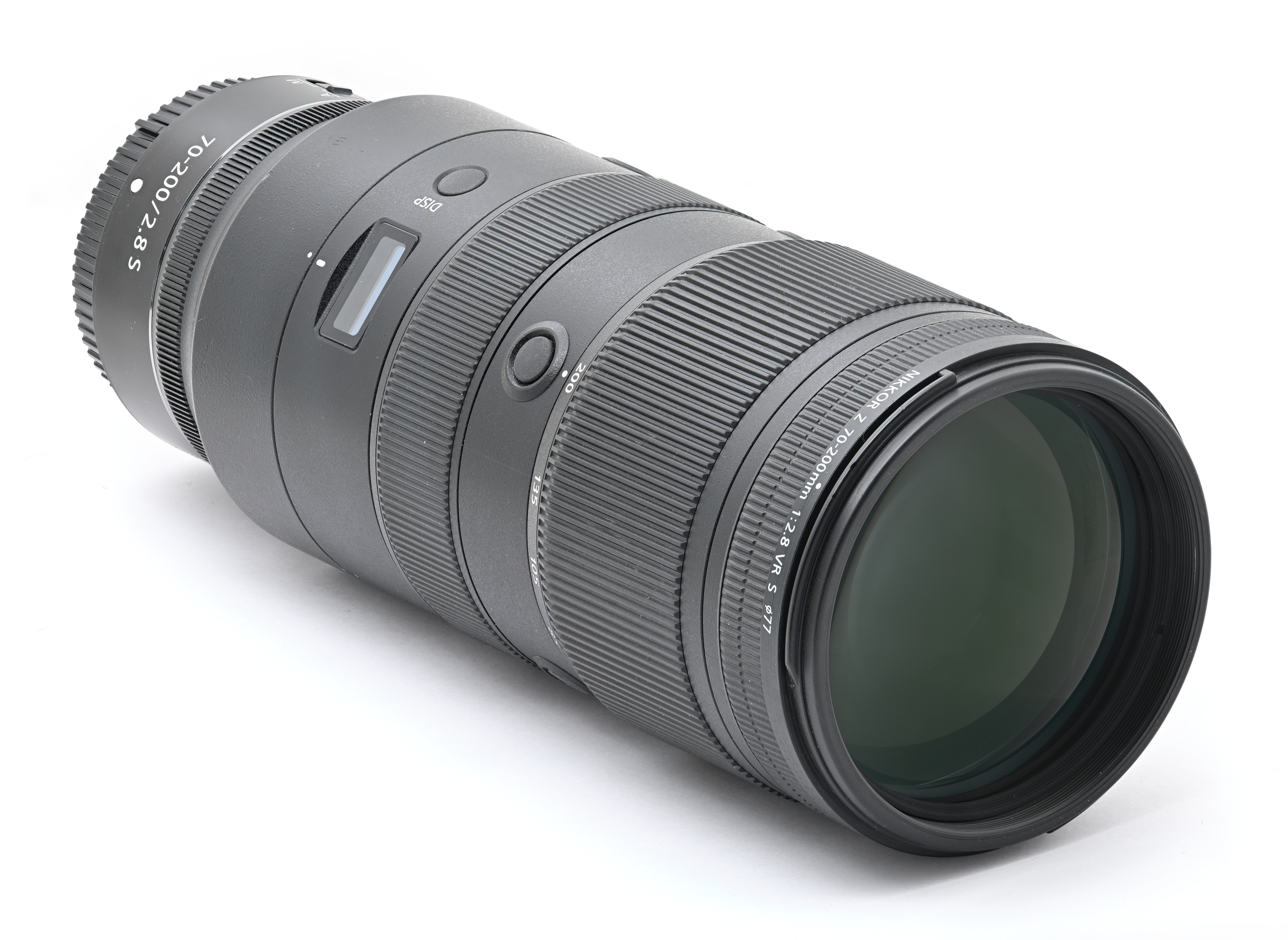
- Maker: Nikon
- Lens mount: Z-mount

Technical data
- Type: Zoom
- Focus drive: Stepping motor
- Focal length: 70-200mm
- Image format: FX (full frame)
- Aperture (max/min): f/2.8–22
- Close focus distance: 0.5m
- Max. magnification: 1:5
- Diaphragm blades: 9 (rounded)
- Construction: 21 elements in 18 groups

Features
- Lens-based stabilization: Yes Yes
- Macro capable: No No
- Unique features: S-Line lens Nano Crystal Coat and ARNEO Coat elements SR element Fluorine element OLED screen

Physical
- Max. length: 220 mm
- Diameter: 89 mm
- Weight: 1440 g (w/ tripod collar); 1360 g
- Filter diameter: 77 mm

Software
- Latest firmware: 1.22 (as of 25 June 2024)
- User flashable: Yes Yes
- Lens ID: 16

Accessories
- Lens hood: HB-92 (bayonet)
- Case: CL-C3

Angle of view
- Diagonal: 34°20'–12°20' (FX); 22°50'–8° (DX)

History
- Introduction: January 2020
- Successor: Nikon Nikkor Z 70-200 mm f/2.8 VR S II

Retail info
- MSRP: 2599.95 USD (as of 2020)

The Nikon Nikkor Z 70-200 mm f/2.8 VR S is a full-frame telephoto zoom lens with a constant aperture of f/2.8, manufactured by Nikon for use on Nikon Z-mount mirrorless cameras.

== Introduction ==
The lens was introduced on January 7, 2020. Originally set to be shipped on February 14, 2020, Nikon delayed the release due to production reasons. The lens comes with a bayonet-type lens hood (HB-92). The lens is compatible with teleconverters Z TC-1.4x and Z TC-2.0x.

The lens achieved a DXOMark score of 38.

== Features ==
- 70-200 mm focal length (approximately equivalent field of view of a 105-300 mm lens when used on a DX format camera)
- S-Line lens
- "Multi-focusing" autofocus system using a stepping motor (STM), dedicated focus-by-wire manual focus ring
- 21 elements in 18 groups (including 6 ED glass, 2 aspherical, 1 fluorite, and 1 short-wavelength refractive (SR) lens elements, elements with Nano Crystal and ARNEO coats, and a fluorine-coated front lens element)
- 9-blade rounded diaphragm
- Vibration Reduction (VR) optical stabilization
- Internal focusing (IF lens)
- Internal zooming
- Multi-function OLED display ("lens information panel"), capable of showing aperture, focus distance and depth of field information
- One customizable control ring at the back (aperture, ISO and exposure compensation functions can be assigned to it)
- One L-Fn and four L-Fn2 customizable function buttons (for a total of 2 assignable functions)
- A/M switch for autofocus/manual focus modes
- Focus limiter switch (full - 5m)
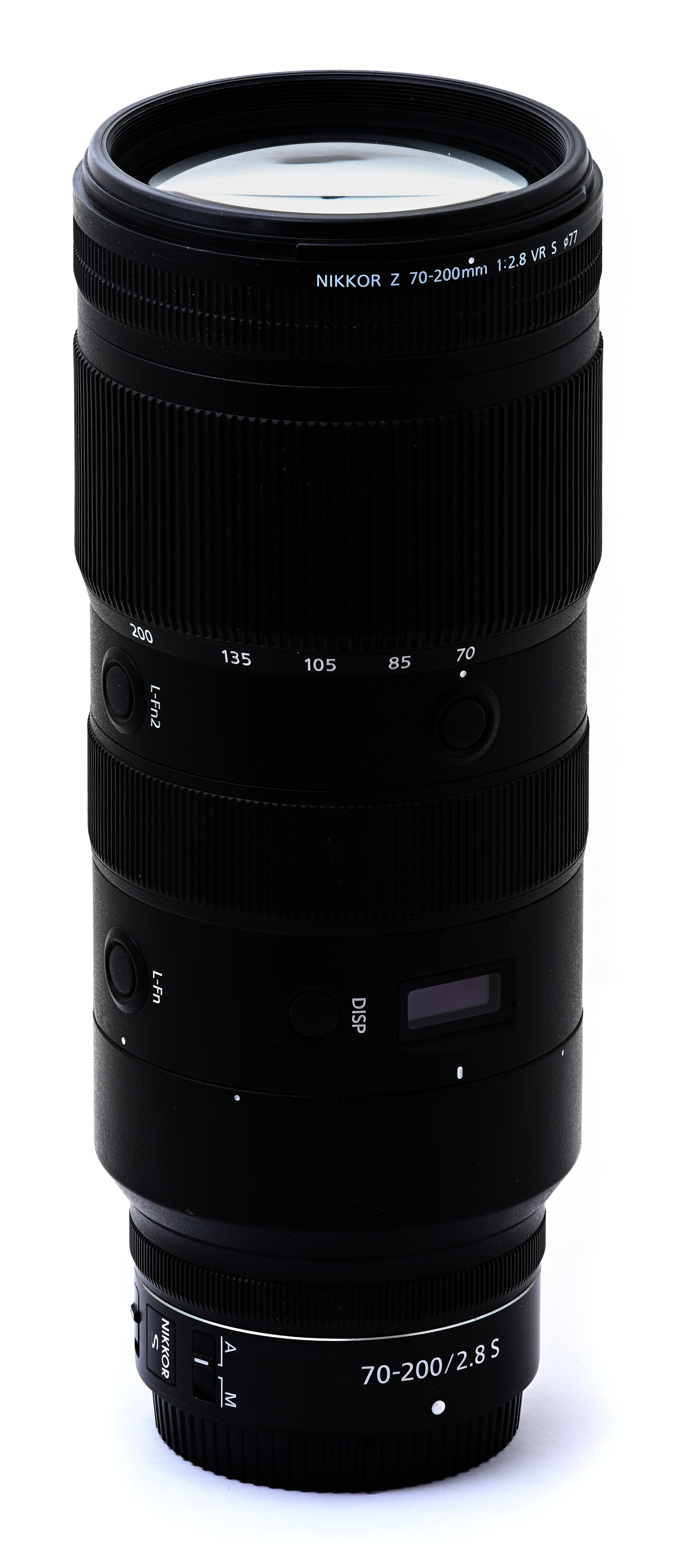

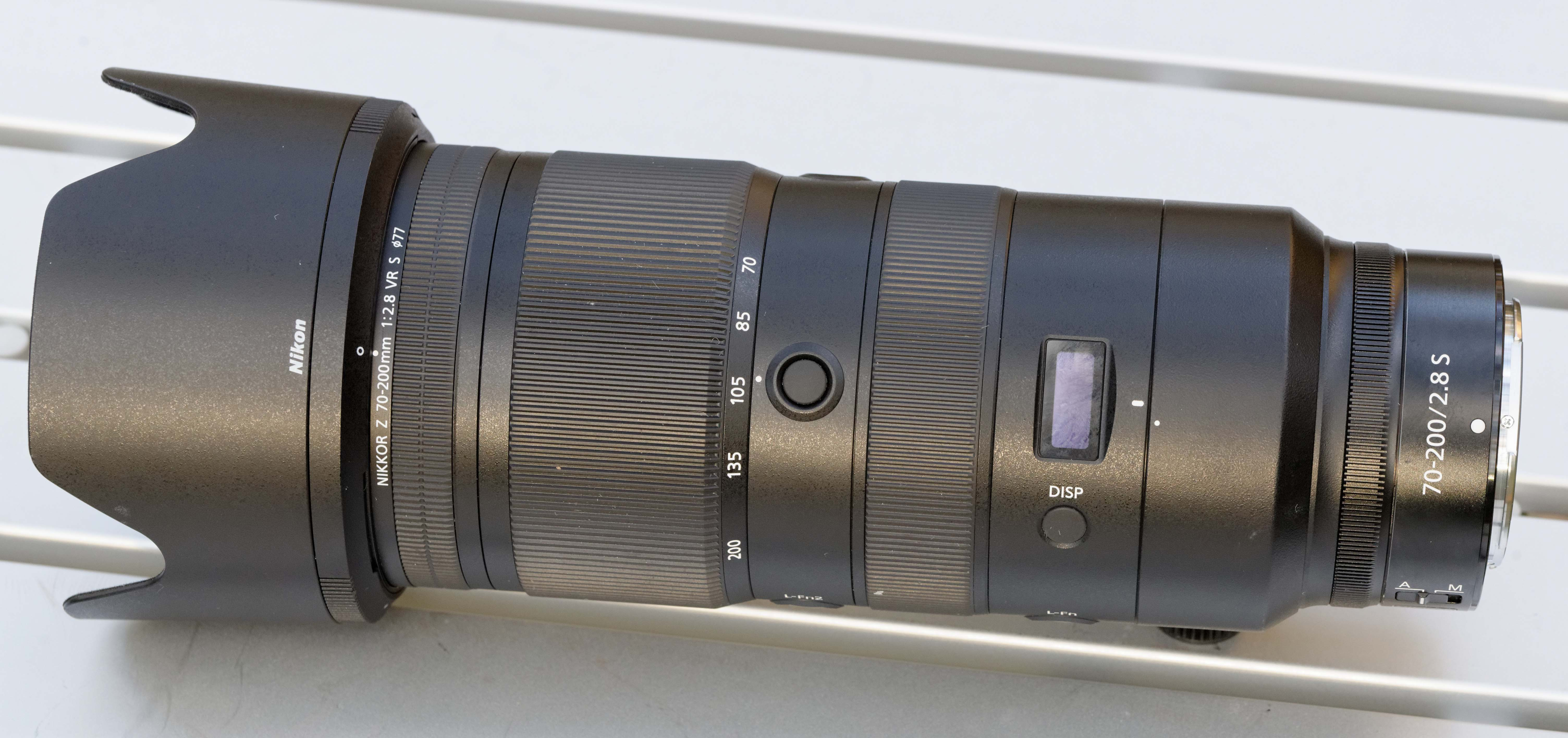
With lens hood attached

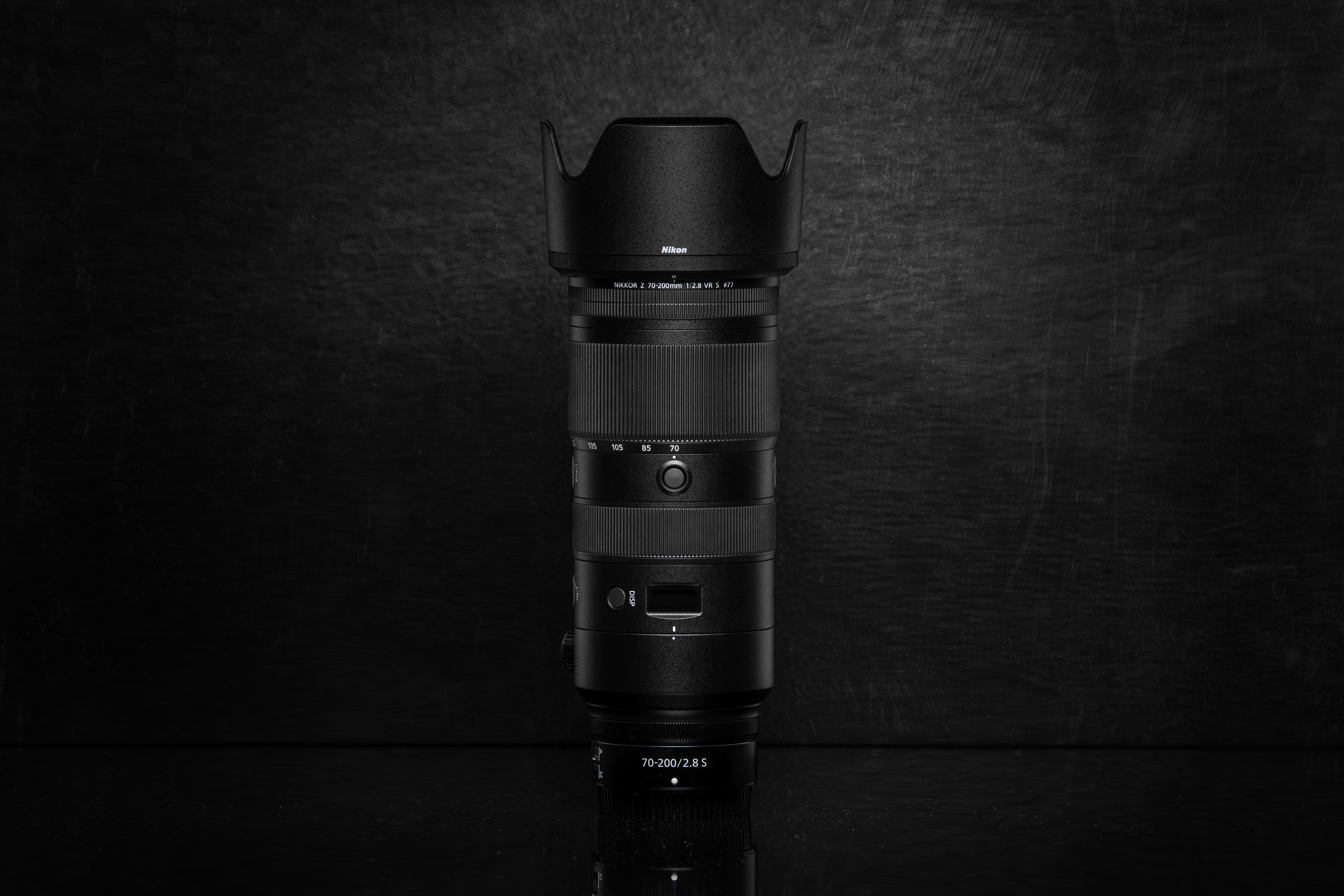
With lens hood attached

== Awards ==
The lens was awarded with the Red Dot Design Award 2021 as part of the "NIKKOR Z f/2.8 Zoom Lens Series", and the Japan Institute of Design Promotion Good Design 2020 award.

== Sample images ==
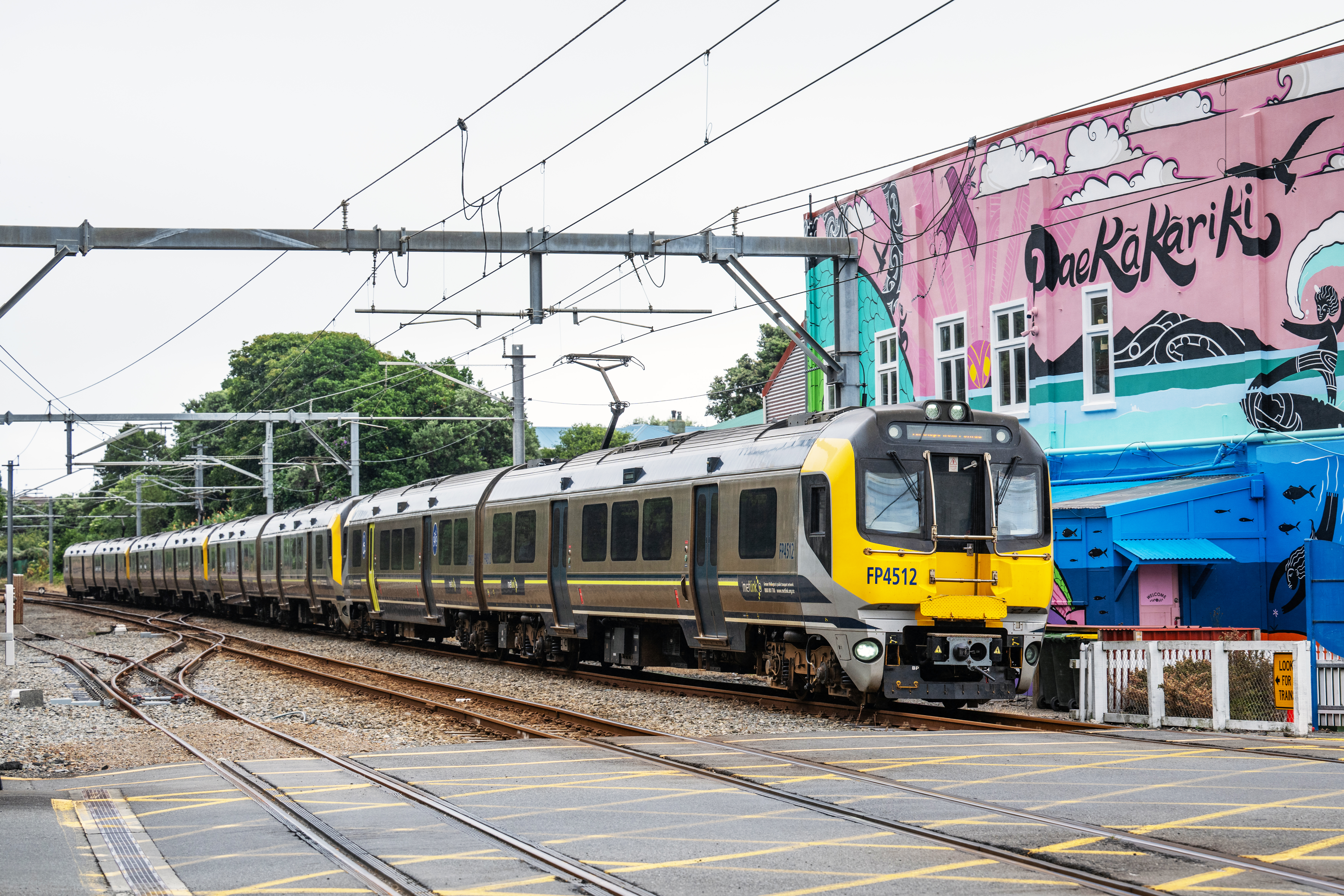
At 71 mm, f/4

At 104 mm (cropped), f/5

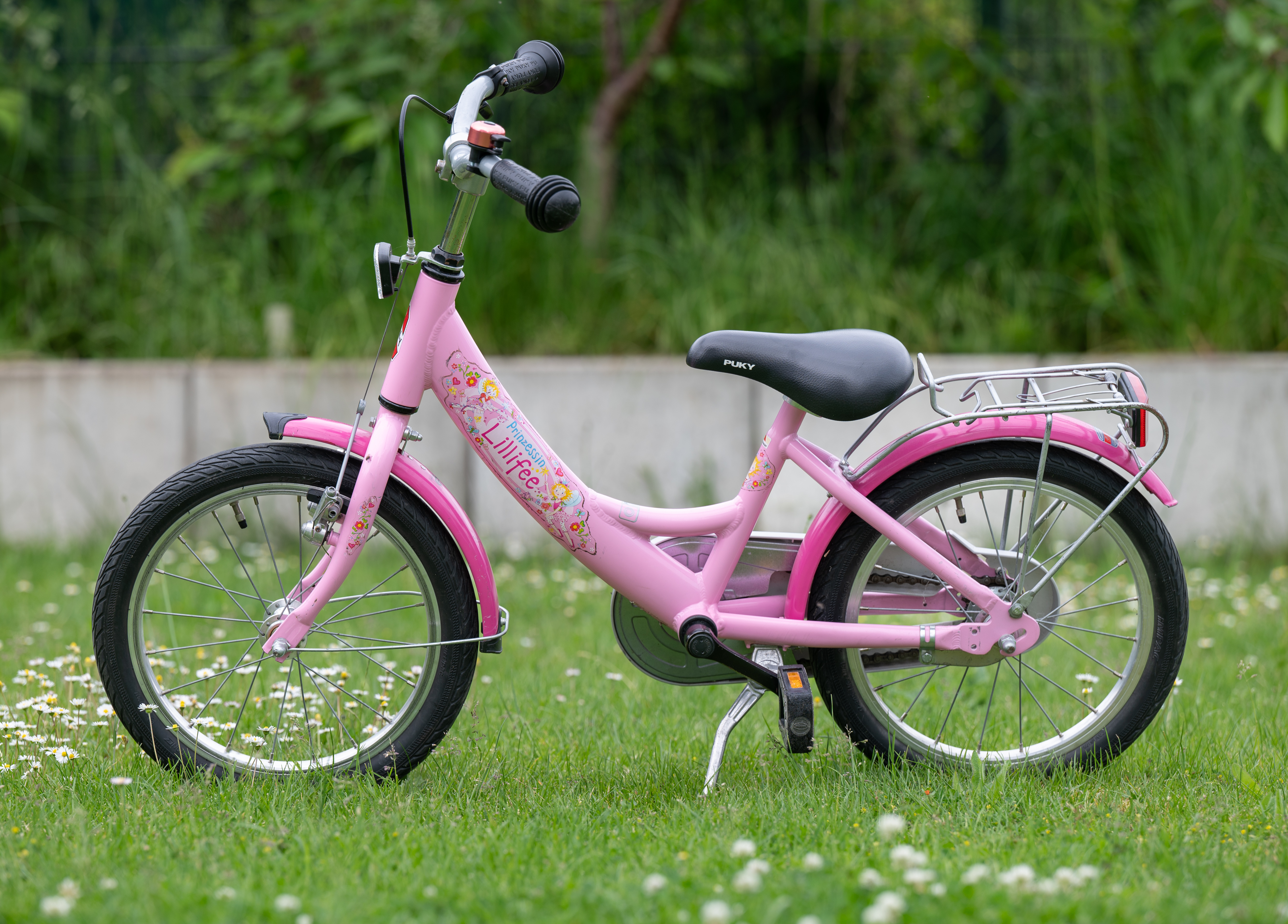
At 150 mm, f/4

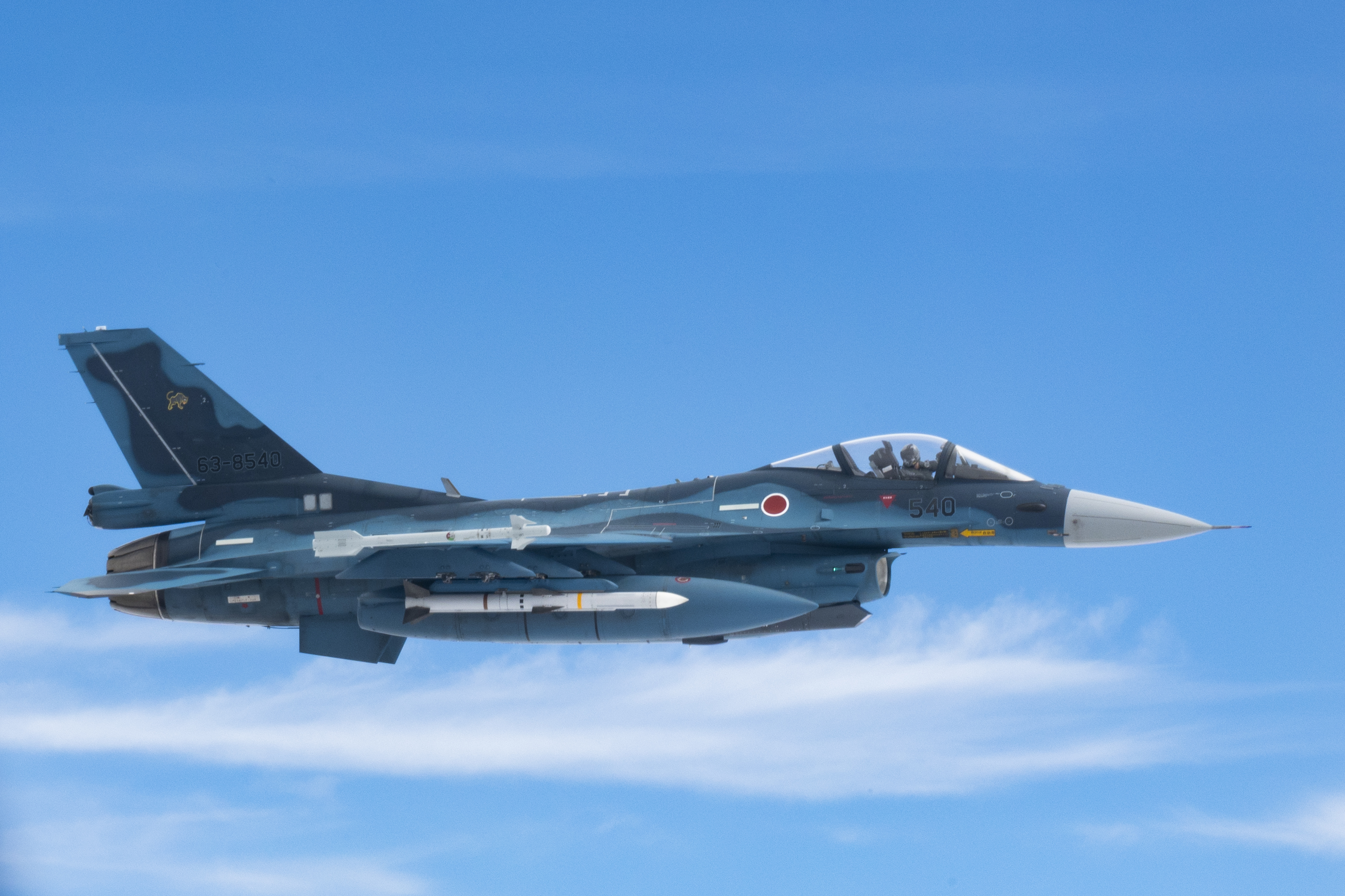
At 165 mm, f/22

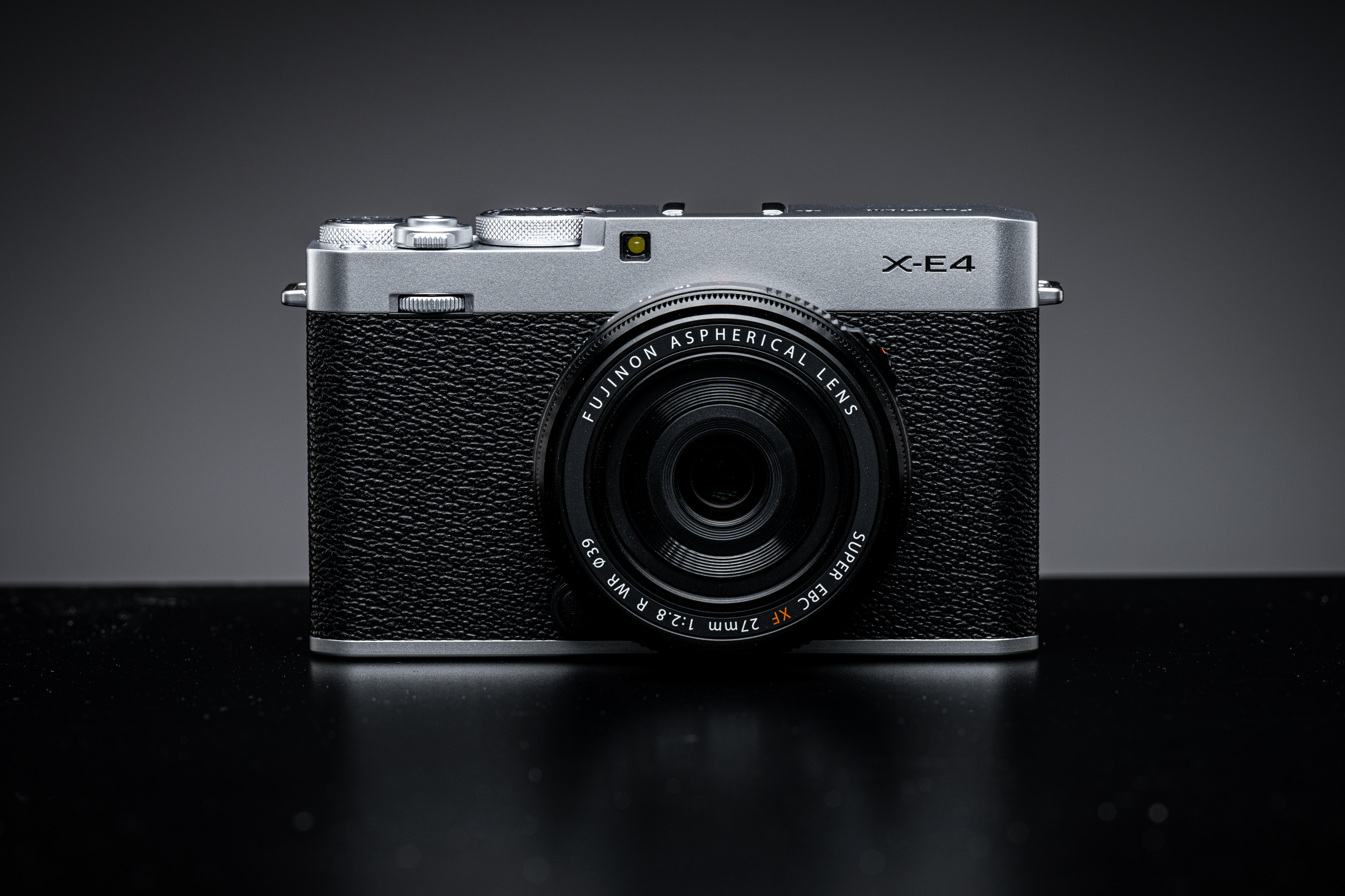
At 165 mm, f/8

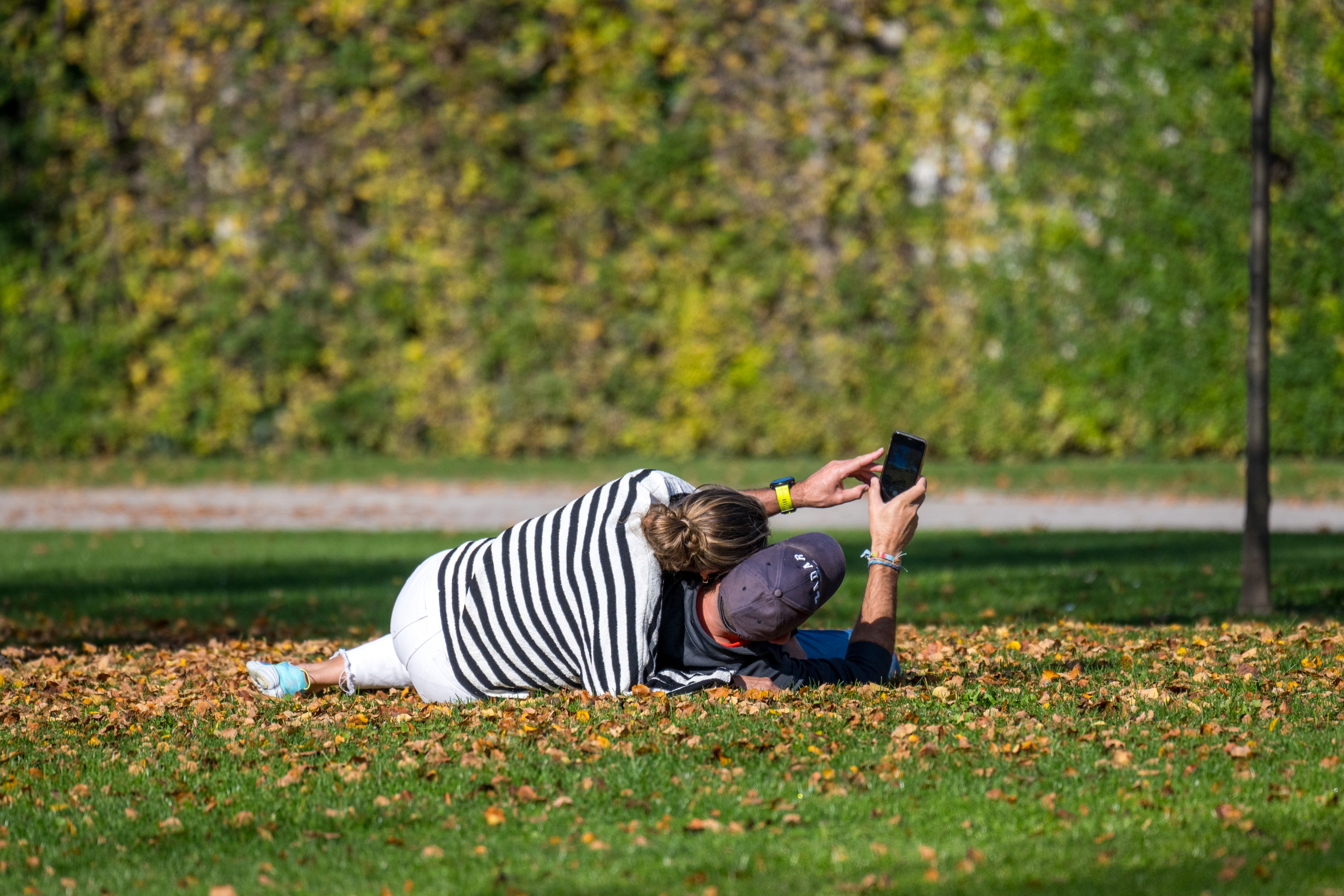
At 200 mm, f/2.8

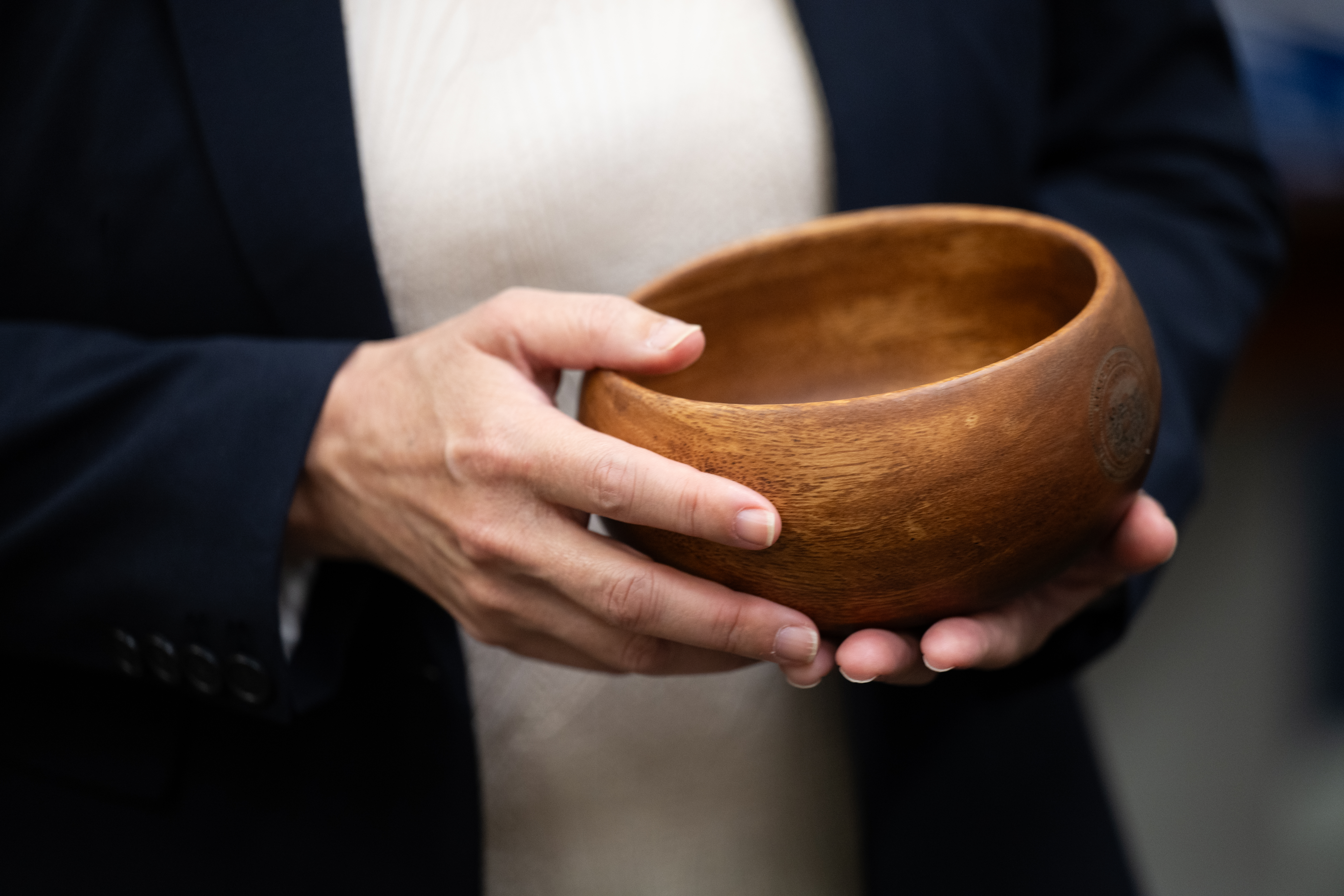
At 200 mm, f/3.2

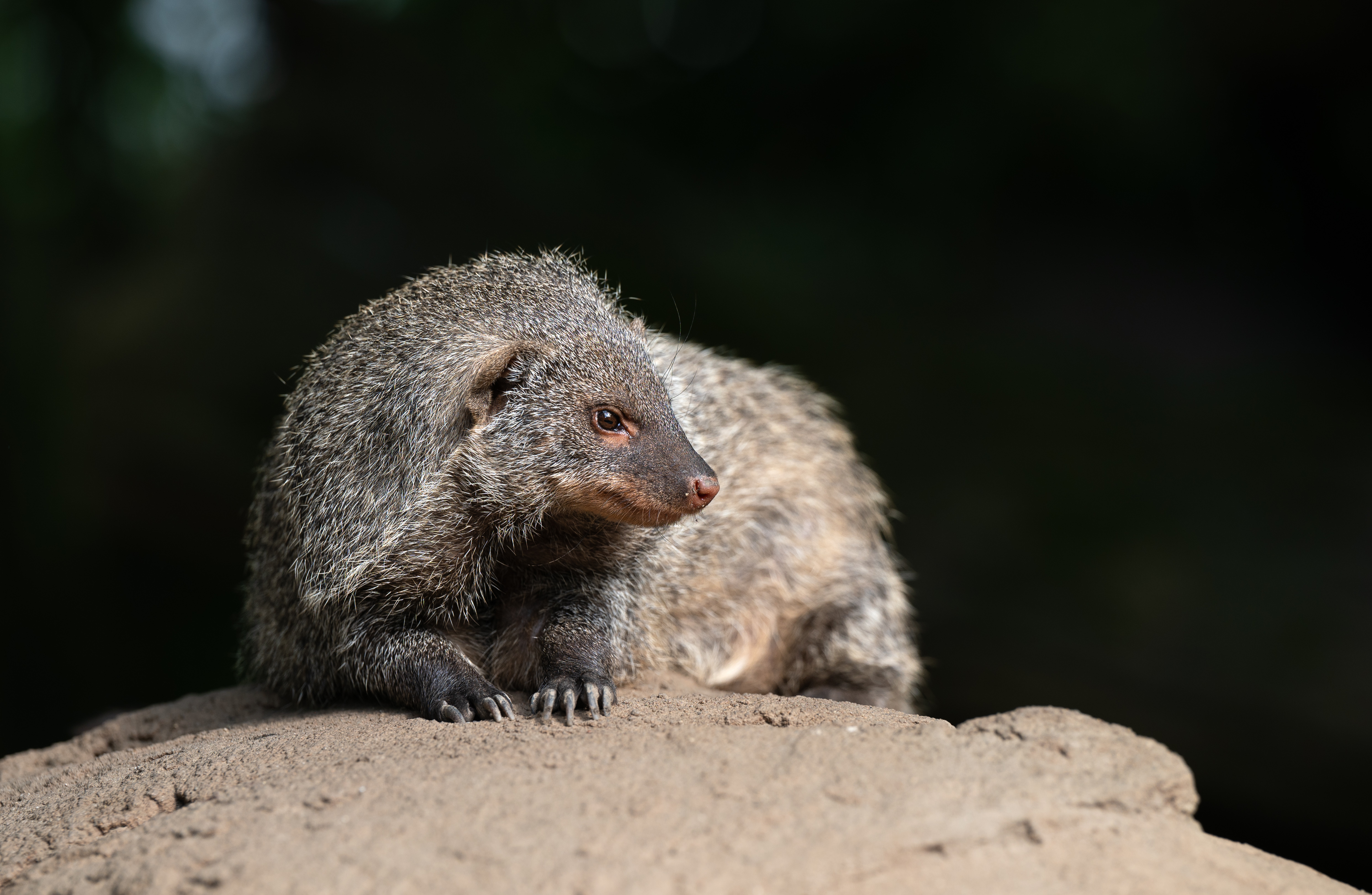
At 200 mm, f/4.5

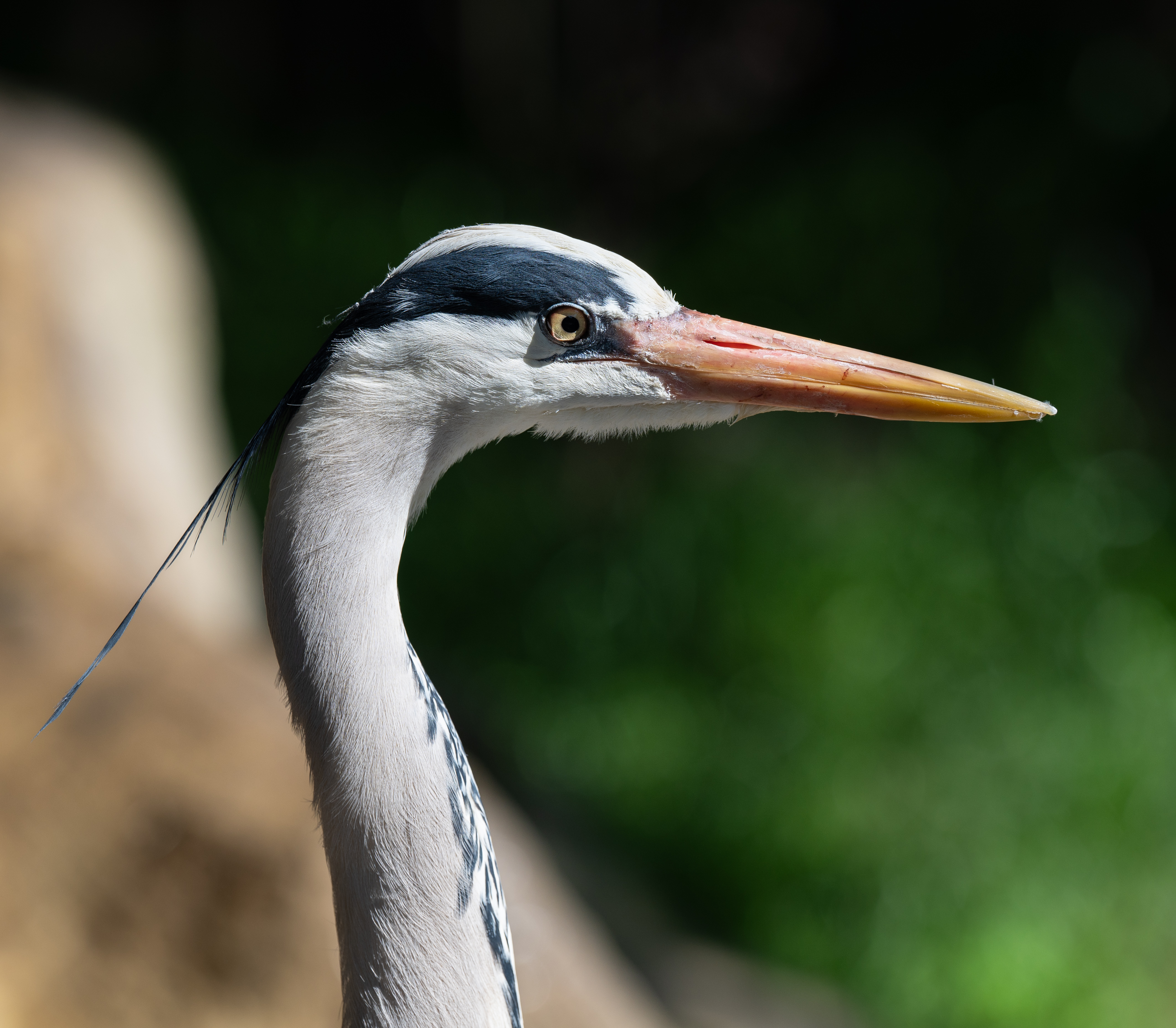
At 200 mm (cropped), f/4.5

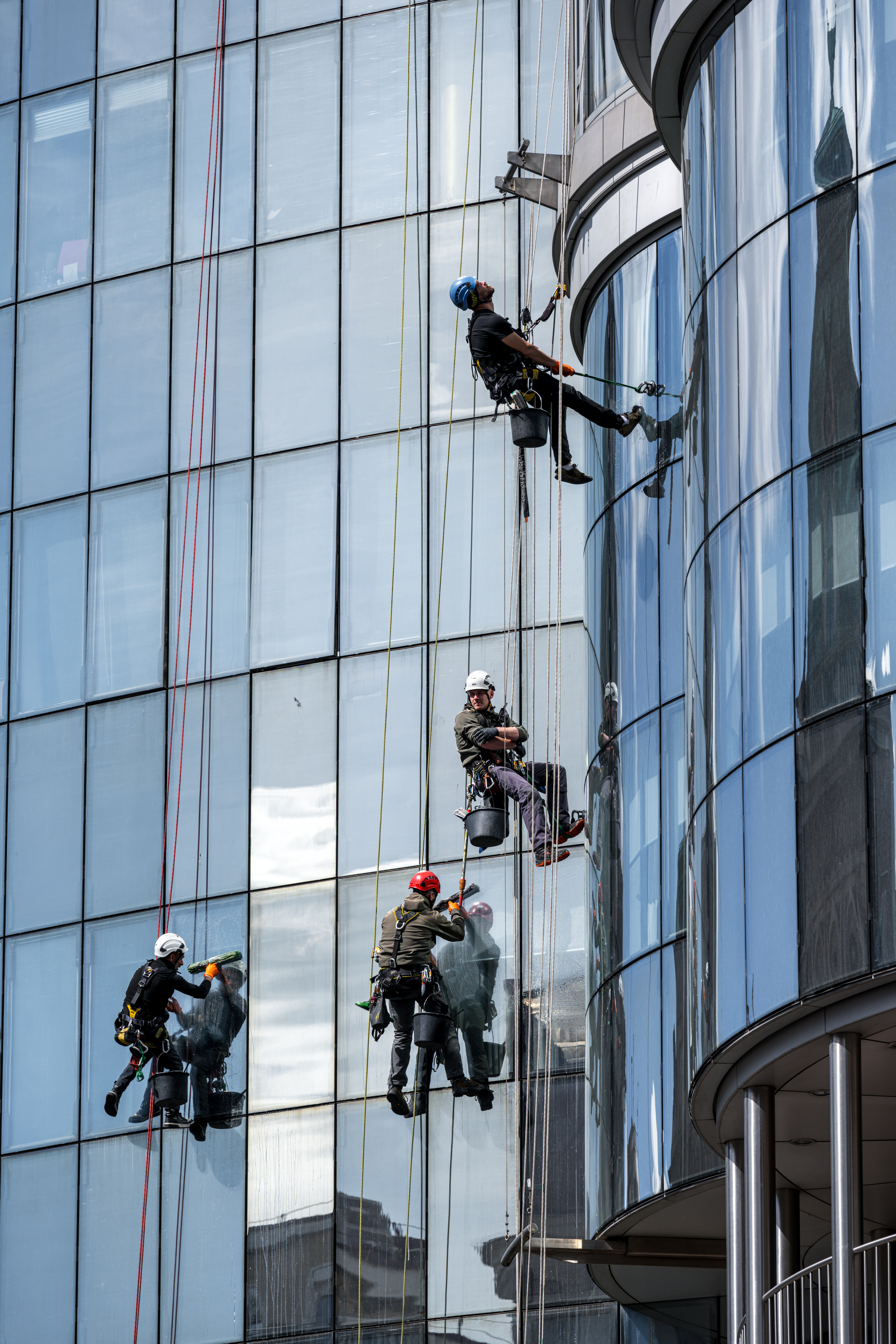
At 200 mm, f/5.6

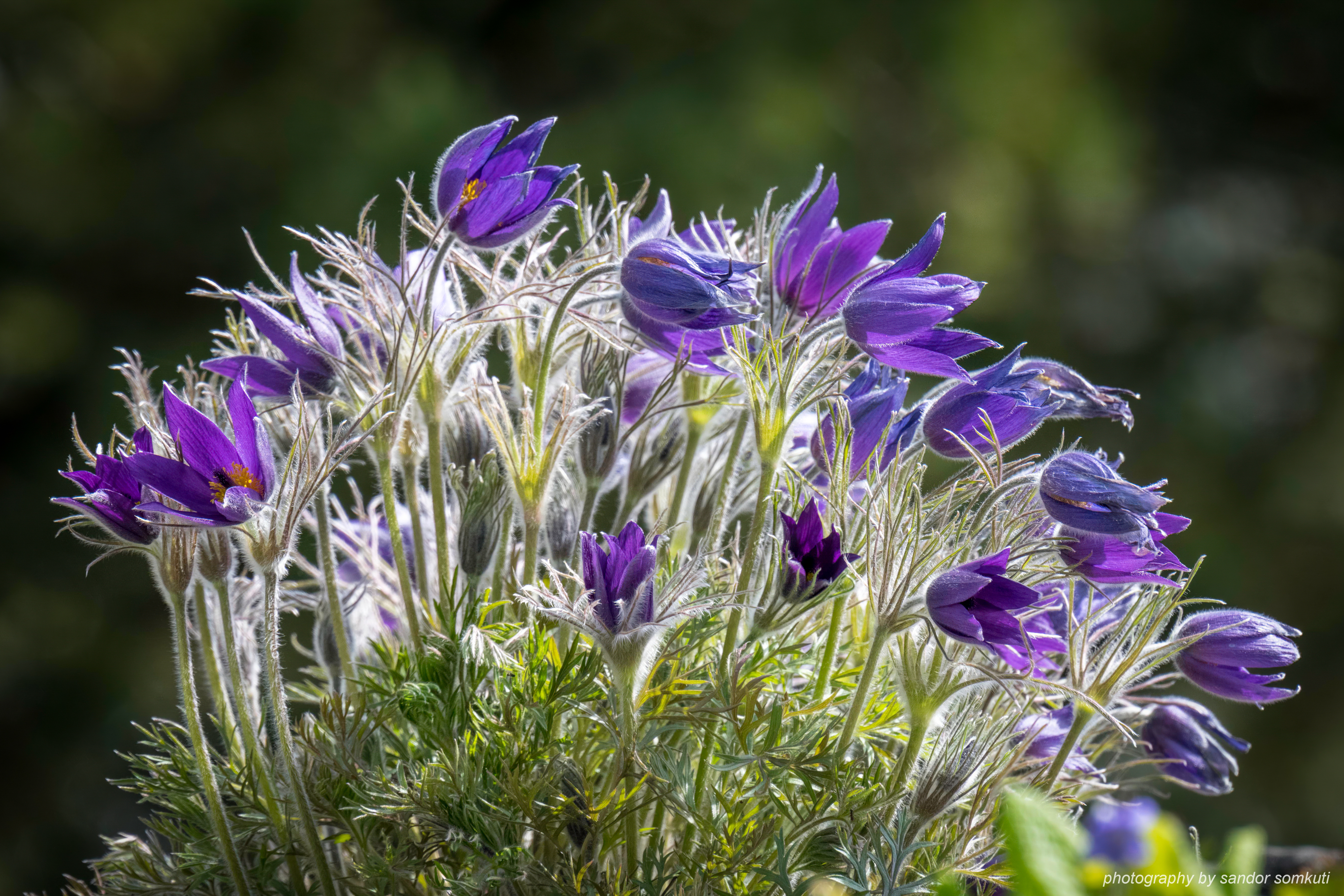
At 200 mm with TC-2.0x (400 mm), f/8

== See also ==
- Nikon Z-mount
