= Yeallow =

French indie rock band

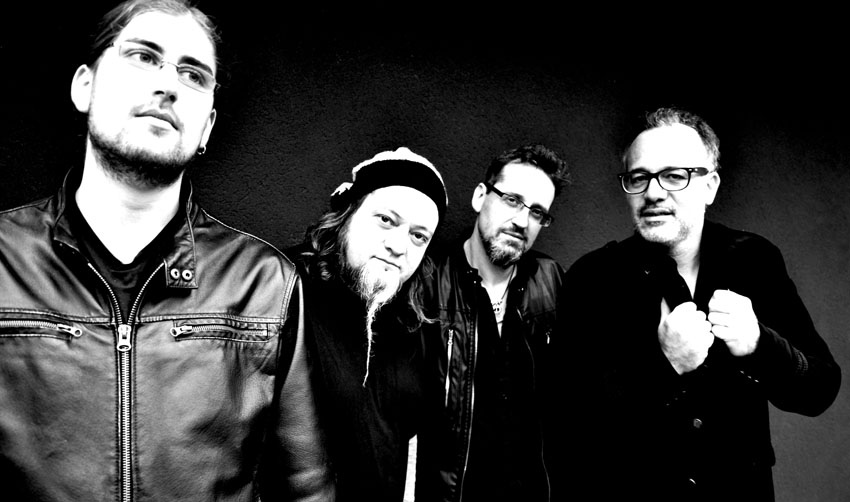
- Official photo of YEALLOW

Background information
- Origin: Strasbourg, France
- Genre: indie rock
- Years active: 2010–present
- Labels: Try & Dye Records
- Members: Peter Maubeuge; Ted; Bill; Ced
- Website: yeallow.net

Yeallow is a French indie rock band from Strasbourg, Alsace, formed in 2008.

== Biography ==
The idea for the project was born in Strasbourg. A debut home-mixed EP, One, digitally released in 2009. In 2009, a viral film for SFR used the song “Temptation” as the soundtrack for the launch of its new product.

In 2010, the group, composed of five musicians with Pascal (vocals, guitar, keyboard) went back to the studio for their second album, 2891 seconds. By mixing in analogy at the studio Grenat in Strasbourg and the mastering being taken care of by Jay Franco from Sterling Sound New York (Art Brut, Coldplay).

In early 2010, a partnership with Fnac, initiated by the head of Fnac Strasbourg allowed the group to present their album on a showcase in all of the Fnac stores in the country and a physical distribution deal was quickly signed with a national player. The album got positive reviews from thirty print and web and radio broadcasts in France, Belgium, England, Russia, the USA and Japan.

Yeallow played the Festival of Artefacts in 2010 and at the Bus Palladium in July that year. At the end of 2010, Yeallow was approached by a tour and events organizer in California offered them shows in the Cat Club, the Mess bar, and Whisky a Go Go in Los Angeles and the Kimos in San Francisco – in all, seven dates in California from March 25 to April 8, 2011.

To manage the development of the group Yeallow entrusted its management to Amina Martin of Rubis Management, and its booking to David Killhoffer of Music For Ever (Scorpions, Popa Chubby, Pat MacManus). In July 2011, Pascal left the band.

The band released the album, Senses, in 2019.

== Members ==
=== Current members ===
- Peter Maubeuge – vocals, guitar, keyboard
- Ted – guitar, backing vocals
- Bill – bass, keyboards
- Ced – drums, percussion

=== Former members ===
- Pascal – vocals, guitar, keyboard

== Discography ==
=== Albums ===
- One (2009) – Try&Dye Records / tunecore
- 2891 seconds (2010) – Try&Dye Records / ILD / Believe
- Homebred (2015) – Try&Dye Records / Believe
- Senses (2019) – Try & Dye Records

=== Singles ===
- "The Bright Side" (2010) – Try&Dye Records
- "The Void / Blown Away" (2012) – Try&Dye Records
- "Clocks" (2014) – Try&Dye Records
