= Black music, des chaînes de fer aux chaînes d'or =

- Directed by: Marc-Aurèle Vecchione
- Screenplay by: Pierre Evil
- Produced by: Program 33
- Edited by: Sylvie Crepel, Mathieu Brunel, Timothy Miller
- Music by: Soper&Shone
- Release date: 2008
- Running time: 100 minutes
- Country: France

Black music, des chaînes de fer aux chaînes d'or is a French 2008 documentary film about African-American music.

== Synopsis ==
Funk, Soul, Rap, Jazz, Swing... For almost two centuries, from the cotton fields of the Deep South to the ghettos in the Bronx, black music has marked the beat of Afro-Americans fight for emancipation. Black American music is a cultural revolution. Its history is political. Its beat makes the world dance.

== Awards ==
The film received the Espace Monde Musicafrica Prize at the 2010 Vues d'Afrique film festival in Montreal.

== See also ==
- Black Soul, a 2002 animated documentary about Black history and music
