= Virtual Hebrides =

The Virtual Hebrides was an influential website which was set up in the Outer Hebrides of Scotland and was in operation from 1994 until 2000.

The Virtual Hebrides was founded by photographer and film maker Sam Maynard , who had set up Eòlas Media — a TV production company largely working through the medium of the Gaelic language — and Scott Hatton, who in the early days of the World Wide Web, had been running one of the first internet-based communities. As the first major website in the Scottish islands and based in a community where nearly everybody knows everybody else, its influence stretched far beyond that of most other websites.

The staff of Eolas photographed in 1997

The Hebrides are agrarian economies, with small, close-knit, widely distributed populations and largely based on crofting, fishing and tourism. Like many marginal communities, they face the problem of depopulation of the traditional communities with young, skilled islanders moving away, matched with incomers looking for a "get away from at all" life. This can cause clashes of interest and culture.

The Virtual Hebrides took these issues head-on with its twin mottos of "live local, work global" and "we are all islanders on the net". It was many things to many people: a Hebrides encyclopedia of articles, a virtual community, a local history project, a promoter of Scottish Gaelic on the internet, a genealogy forum and a campaigning platform for rural equality, amongst other aims.

At one point in 1995, it claimed to be the largest rural website in the world as measured by visitors to its many pages.

Based in such a small economy, the Virtual Hebrides was perhaps doomed to failure. Grant funding allocated for the production of Gaelic TV programmes was used by the parent company Eòlas Media to fund development. Scott Hatton left in 1998 to work on the GlobalGuide project and was replaced by Alex Tearse. It was identified that the site had become rambling with many pages having little or no content and it was also noticed the many independent local sites that were beginning to appear. It was felt there was no strategic vision for the site.

It was decided that the Virtual Hebrides would be rebuilt to become the central hub for all of these local sites while remaining the main resource for Hebrides related information and discussions were held with local sites to this end. On a larger scale, it was also decided to capitalise on past investment and build 'Region in a Box' a formatted version of the site to be sold to any region wanting representation in cyber space. One of the 'Virtual hebrides' most notable innovations was the use of maps and over-laid satellite images as a central search interface.

Despite there being serious interest from a number of potential purchasers of 'Region In A Box' and Eolas Media as a progressive media convergent company, before agreements were made, the company found themselves in financial difficulties and went into voluntary liquidation. By 2000, both the Virtual Hebrides and Eòlas Media were no more.

While its influence is, at times, overstated, especially in the southern Outer Hebrides, (it was based in Stornoway, Lewis), claims that it was at least partly responsible for opening up the Hebrides to new ways of working are also largely untrue. Some Hebrideans began to look to new media for their living. It was realised that, in the world of the internet, geographical location was suddenly less important. Subsequently, an initiative in North Lochs championed remote work, a call centre became one Stornoway's largest employers and a campaign for reasonably priced broadband started in the islands.

Incidentally, whilst by no means the first use of the word ('virtual reality' had been around since 1989)), perhaps due to this website, the prefix "Virtual" became endemic on the World Wide Web for a while in the mid-1990s.

Within a few months of the failure of the original Virtual Hebrides various attempts were made to resurrect the site. A number of local sites were amalgamated with an archive of the original site to create a new site.
