= Je n'aime pas le classique, mais ça j'aime bien! =

Je n'aime pas le classique, mais ça j'aime bien! (literally "I don't like classical music, but this I really like" in French) is a successful series of compilation albums of classical music interpreted by various artists. They were released on RCA / Sony BMG. The set was favourably reviewed by RTL's "classics" radio presenter Charlotte Latour.

Date released	Album	Peak positions	# of weeks in chart	Notes
Date released	Album	FR	# of weeks in chart	Notes
1 December 2008	Je n'aime pas le classique, mais ça j'aime bien!	53	57w	2 CDs, 45 tracks RCA / Sony BMG
1 November 2010	Je n'aime toujours pas le classique, mais ça j'aime bien!	74	22w	2 CDs, 35 tracks RCA / Sony
1 November 2010	Je n'aime décidément pas le classique, mais ça j'aime bien!	143	9w	2 CDs, 26 tracks RCA / Sony
3 October 2011	Je n'aime pas le classique, mais ça j'aime bien! - 6 CD box	60	10w	6 CD Box set Rerelease of all three above RCA / Sony
21 October 2013	Je n'aimerai jamais le classique, mais ça j'aime bien! - 4 CD box	111	4w	2 CDs box 40 tracks RCA

== Related jazz series ==
After the success of the classics series, a jazz series was released in December 2013

Date released	Album	Peak positions	# of weeks in chart	Notes
Date released	Album	FR	# of weeks in chart	Notes
23 February 2009	Je n'aime pas le jazz, mais ça j'aime bien!	158	2w	2 CDs, 40 tracks Sony Music
2 December 2013	Je n'aime toujours pas le jazz mais ça j'aime bien!	161	2w	4 CDs, 81 tracks Sony Music
