= Patrick Alexandroni =

French actor, rapper, and television producer

Patrick Alexandroni (1962–2008) was a French actor, rapper, and television producer.
