= Perceptual MegaPixel =

The Perceptual MegaPixel (P-MP) is a proprietary ranking of lens-camera combinations, created by DxO Labs. It is intended to express the resolution of which a combination of camera and lens is capable. Complete scientific or technical documentation of the process used to compute P-MP values has never been published, and P-MP measurements have never been made without the cooperation of DxO Labs. The name of the measurement is a trade mark.

The P-MP meant for photographers to consider when comparing the sharpness of a combination of camera and lens. DxO Labs claims that P-MP is a more accurate and relevant value for photographers to consider when weighing-up camera sharpness.

As of March 2017, the "Canon EF 300mm f/2.8L IS II USM" lens mounted on a "Canon EOS 5Ds R" has the highest measured P-Mpix value in the DxO Labs lens database, a value of 44.7. On the lens' summary pages this figure is rounded to an integer value of 45 P-Mpix
