= 2008 French mistaken virginity case =

On 1 April 2008, the high court of Lille (France) annulled a marriage on the grounds of "mistaken essential qualities of the spouse" in accordance with article 180 paragraph 2 [archive] of the French civil code. The woman was not a virgin at the time of the marriage ceremony, but had not admitted this to the man even though she knew that her status as a virgin was a determining factor in his motivation and consent to marry her. According to this initial court ruling, this was sufficient to declare the marriage annulled and therefore not to be recognized as a lawful marriage.

At the end of May 2008, a controversy ensued, and several public figures, politicians, religious figures, and intellectuals reacted to the decision. Following these events, the Minister of Justice Rachida Dati asked the Ministère public, namely the Procureur général of Douai, to make an appeal against the wishes of the couple. The appeal was lodged with the high court of Douai, on 3 June 2008.

On 17 November 2008, the judgment of the high court was declared null by the court of appeals. Since the annulment of the marriage was itself annulled, the final ruling was that the man and woman had been, and remained, legally married.

== Legal facts ==
On 8 July 2006, the couple held a marriage ceremony at Mons-en-Barœul. The man, born in 1976 in Morocco, was an engineering consultant. The woman was French, of Moroccan descent, born in 1983 in the North of France, and was a nursing student. Both were of Muslim faith.

At around four in the morning, after the couple had retired to their bedroom, the man returned to the guests and angrily informed them that the woman was not a virgin.

=== The plea of the former husband, accepted by the wife ===
On 26 July 2006, the man filed for an annulment to the high court of Lille. He pleaded the fact that his wife had been presented to him as chaste before the marriage. It would therefore be an annulment on the grounds of ‘mistaken essential qualities of the spouse [...] which were determining factors in his consent’, in accordance with article 180, paragraph 2 of the French civil code concerning a 'mistake regarding the person.' The wife approved the annulment, while the Ministère public ‘declares it has put its trust in justice’. On 1 April 2008, the high court of Lille announced the annulment of the marriage on the basis of article 180 of the civil code. The woman's acceptance of the request allowed it to be deduced that she had known that her virginity constituted, in the view of her husband, an essential quality with regard to the consent to the proposed marriage.

=== Appeal of the prosecution against the will of the parties ===
Although having initially approved the court's decision, on 2 June 2008 the Minister of Justice, Rachida Dati, asked the parquet to lodge an appeal against the judgment, which was filed on 3 June (this appeal may still be admissible, the one-month period available to the Ministère public to file it according to certain people is to be calculated from the notification of the judgment to him or her; this analysis is backed up by article 528 of the civil procedure code which indicates that: ‘The period at the expiry of which an appeal may no longer be lodged runs from the notification of the ruling, unless this period has started, by law, from the date of the ruling’).

The judgement being provided by provisional execution, the parquet also summoned the parties in emergency interim proceedings, (including the civil official of Mons-en-Barœul) to request his judgment. The hearing took place on 12 June and the decision was made on 19 June. The court announced the end of the provisional execution of the annulment ruling, invoking the risk of an ‘irreparable prejudice, for both parties as well as for public order’. One of the objectives is to prevent the risk of having to annul a second marriage which would be contracted after the annulment of the first one, the annulment decision susceptible to being reversed. Consequently, the transcription of the annulment in the marriage register was suspended and the two people remained married.

The court of appeals examined the case on 22 September 2008. The woman's lawyer, Mr Mauger, declared that he would request an annulment of the marriage, but for different reasons than those given in the previous instance. The parquet considered grounds such as mistaken identity, lack of cohabitation or lack of consent. The judgment had to be given on 17 November,

=== The annulment of the Douai Court of Appeal ===
On 17 November 2008, the Court of Appeal of Douai overturned the decision. The Court considered that the woman's virginity had not been cited by the husband as a necessary condition of the marriage. In fact, the husband indicated in his pleadings that the mistake was not about virginity but about the confidence he had in his wife, and that virginity was merely an expectation. According to him, his wife's lie caused a mistake with regards to the essential quality of the confidence he had in her. The Court rejected this argument, because the lie, contested by the wife, could not be proven.

Nevertheless, commenting on the possibility of virginity being an essential quality, the Court clarified that in any event, the wife's virginity cannot be considered as an essential quality since it has no negative impact on married life. The Court equally rejected the annulment application formulated by the wife, who alleged that her husband did not have ‘the willingness to accept, even the capacity to understand the obligation of respect between spouses’ because ‘the facts do not allow the characterisation of a mistake of the wife on essential qualities of the husband’.

Since the annulment of the marriage was annulled, the spouses are still legally married.

== Points of view of the spouses ==
=== The husband ===
The version of events given by the husband is known from the summary of his statement drawn up by the court: his future wife had been presented to him as single and chaste and it was only on the night of the marriage that she admitted a previous liaison. Because of this lie, the trust necessary for a marital relationship seemed to him to be lacking, justifying the annulment of the marriage.

Once the case was mediatised, the husband's lawyer, Mr Xavier Labbée, explained his client's position. He notably exposed that the wife had had a long previous liaison, never mentioned before the marriage, and underlined again that it was above all due to this concealment that his client wished to be released from matrimonial ties—even if the lack of virginity had also played a role.

Mr Xavier Labbée underlined additionally that religion had nothing to do with the court's decision, and said that certain comments which have highlighted it without subtlety are 'scandalous' (his summons, however, refers to a "community where it is tradition that a wife remains a virgin until marriage"); he additionally said that an annulment has an advantage over a divorce since it helps the woman to 'start afresh'.

=== The wife ===
The woman's lawyer, Mr. Charles-Édouard Mauger, explained the version of events from his client's point of view. The future spouses had met two years before the marriage, during which time the woman did not have 'the strength' to explain to her fiancé that she was no longer a virgin; she had even considered an operation to reconstruct her hymen. On their wedding night, her angry husband had announced the news to the guests at four in the morning before immediately driving back to his parents' house. Mr Mauger wanted to point out that he had found his client have been suffering greatly. He then explained his decision to 'accept the annulment': it was not for him a 'submission' but a strategy allowing ‘technical escape’ of a procedure that risked being long, but in which he was convinced that his client would have been able to obtain justice if she had chosen to oppose her husband's request. Ultimately, the court's decision satisfied her entirely since it 'allowed her to regain her freedom'.

The wife has also deeply criticised the way in which this case was dealt with; she is also angry about not being consulted on the appeal decision:

"Hearing everyone talking about me is very difficult," she said. "I am not the leader of a movement, I do not claim responsibility for anything. Since the beginning I've had to go through everything in this case. [...] That there can be an appeal against the ruling when I never asked for that outrages me. I just want to be able to live my life normally."
