= Marcel Mouly =

French painter

- Born: February 6, 1918; Paris
- Died: January 7, 2008 (aged 89); Clamart
- Education: Picasso, Léger, Jacques Lipchitz
- Known for: Painting, printmaking
- Movement: Fauvism
- Awards: Chevalier de L'Orde des Arts et Lettres (1957); Premier Prix de Lithographie (1973)

Marcel Mouly (February 6, 1918 – January 7, 2008) was a French artist who painted in an abstract style.

== Early life ==
Mouly was born in Paris, France, on February 6, 1918. His interest in art developed in grade school. Mouly was first sent to drawing class as a form of punishment. At age 13, he left school to work, first as a beach vendor, then as an apprentice to a local dentist and later for a wine merchant delivering heavy baskets of wine. In 1935, while still employed by the wine merchant, Mouly began taking night classes in the arts at French Academies, the Cours Montparnasse 80, where he remained until he served in military duty during the Second World War beginning in 1938. After France fell to Germany in June 1940, Mouly became a civilian again, and earned a living working odd jobs. Mouly befriended an artist named Bernard la Fourcade, and the two established a studio in Auteuil. During a trip to Normandy in 1942, they were stopped by German officials and questioned for their lack of travel documentation, which was then required by the Vichy government. Mouly and la Fourcade were arrested shortly after their return to Paris, and mistakenly imprisoned as spies. During his solitary confinement, Mouly solidified his plans to become an artist.

== Career ==
Shortly after being released from prison, Mouly, along with fellow artist Édouard Pignon, rented the Boulogne studio of famed modernist sculptor Jacques Lipchitz (1891–1973). Mouly learned from Lipchitz, particularly about the style of cubism. By the mid-1940s, Mouly's art began to gain notoriety from his peers and collectors. In 1945, his paintings were exhibited alongside the paintings of Matisse in the Salon d'Automne in Paris. The following year he moved to La Ruche where he became friends with Picasso, Chagall, and Klein, and exhibited at the Salon du Mai. Mouly's first one-person exhibition was held in 1949 at the Libraire Bergamasque.

Mouly's style was influenced by the deep, bold colors typically used in Matisse's fauvist works, and by the cubism of Picasso. Beginning in the mid-1950s, Mouly created many lithographs.

== Fame and honors ==
Marcel Mouly's work has been exhibited all over the world, including in the permanent collections of more than 20 museums, such as the Museum of Modern Art in Paris, the Museum of Modern Art in Japan, the Museum of Geneva, the Museum of Modern Art in Helsinki, and Paris' Bibliotheque Nationale. He has also been the subject of numerous books, and recognized by such honors as the Chevalier de L'Orde des Arts et Lettres (1957) and the Premier Prix de Lithographie (1973).

Marcel Mouly died on January 7, 2008, at age 89. "His art is pure and direct in its message," said art historian and writer Joseph Jacobs. "It is an art about beauty and life, and art roots firmly planted in the School of Paris. Picasso, Braque, Matisse, Rouault, Vlaminck, Chagall, Vuillard and Dufy are his patrimony, and he has carried their mantel with unflagging dedication."

== Exhibitions ==
- 1990 - Atelier Gourdon, Palm Springs
- 1996 - Musee de Shanghai, China
- 1997 - Kwai Fung Hin Gallery, Hong Kong
- 1997 - Park West Gallery, Michigan
- 1997 - Le Domaine Perdu Galerie Meyral Perigerd, with his son Pierre, a sculptor
- 1998 - Philipps Gallery, Palm Beach, Florida
- 1999 - Opera Gallery, Paris
- 1999 - University Museum, Carbondale, Illinois with Pierre Mouly
- 1999 - Galerie Nolan Rankin, Houston, Texas with Pierre Mouly
- 2000 - Galerie du Chateau, Noirmoutier, France
- 2000 - Park West Gallery, Michigan
- 2005 - Chok Som Bo Kum Pao Gallery, Guangzhou
- 2006 - Opera Gallery, Paris
- 2007 - National Fine Art Canada

== Collections ==
- The Centre Pompidou, France
- Queensland Art Gallery|Gallery of Modern Art (QAGOMA), Brisbane, Australia
