= Article =

Article often refers to:

- Article (grammar), a grammatical element used to indicate definiteness or indefiniteness
- Article (publishing), a piece of nonfictional prose that is an independent part of a publication

Article(s) may also refer to:

== Government and law ==
- Elements of treaties of the European Union
- Articles of association, the regulations governing a company, used in India, the UK and other countries; called articles of incorporation in the US
- Articles of clerkship, the contract accepted to become an articled clerk
- Articles of Confederation, the predecessor to the current United States Constitution
- Article of impeachment, a formal document and charge used for impeachment in the United States
- Article of manufacture, in the United States patent law, a category of things that may be patented
- Articles of organization, for limited liability organizations, a US equivalent of articles of association

== Other uses ==
- Article element <article>...</article>, in HTML
- "Articles", a song on the 1993 album Un-Sentimental by Beowülf

== See also ==
- Artical (disambiguation)
- Article One (disambiguation)
- Article Two (disambiguation)
- Article Three (disambiguation)
- Article Four (disambiguation)
- Article Five (disambiguation)
- Article Six (disambiguation)
- Article Seven (disambiguation)
- Article 15 (disambiguation)
- Articles of Religion (disambiguation)
