= Madras State (Alteration of Name) Act, 1968 =

1968 Indian Parliament act renaming Madras State to Tamil Nadu

Parliament of India
- Long title: Madras State (Alteration of Name) Act, 1968
- Territorial extent: India
- Passed by: Lok Sabha
- Passed: 22 November 1968
- Passed by: Rajya Sabha
- Passed: 05 December 1968
- Assented to by: Zakir Husain
- Assented to: 20 December 1968
- Signed by: Zakir Husain
- Signed: 20 December 1968
- Commenced: 14 January 1969
- Effective: 14 January 1969

Final stages
- Finally passed both chambers: 22 November 1968 (Lok Sabha); 05 December 1968 (Rajya Sabha)
- Status: In force

The Madras State (Alteration of Name) Act, 1968 is an Act of the Parliament of India that officially renamed Madras State to Tamil Nadu. The Act went into effect on 14 January 1969, following a state legislative assembly resolution spearheaded by then-Chief Minister C. N. Annadurai.

== Background ==
The demand to rename Madras State to Tamil Nadu gained significant traction following the fast unto death by Gandhian activist Potti Sreeramulu for a separate Telugu state, which led to the linguistic reorganization of Indian states in 1956. While the territories were carved out along linguistic lines, the residuary state continued to be officially called Madras State. Activists and political groups, most notably spearheaded by M. P. Sivagnanam and Sankaralinganar, who died after a 76-day fast in 1956, pushed heavily for the name change.

== History ==
Following the 1967 Madras State Legislative Assembly election, the Dravida Munnetra Kazhagam (DMK) came to power, and Chief Minister C. N. Annadurai introduced a resolution in the state legislative assembly on 23 July 1967 to change the name of the state. The resolution was passed unanimously by the state assembly.

Since renaming a state requires a constitutional alteration under Article 3 and Article 4 of the Constitution of India, the matter was forwarded to the Central Government. The Madras State (Alteration of Name) Bill was introduced in the Parliament of India. The bill was passed by the Lok Sabha on 22 November 1968 and subsequently by the Rajya Sabha on 5 December 1968. It received the assent of the President of India, Zakir Husain, on 20 December 1968.

The official date chosen for the Act to take effect was 14 January 1969, coinciding with the Pongal festival day, marking the formal birth of Tamil Nadu.

== See also ==
- States Reorganisation Act
- History of Tamil Nadu
- Part I of the Constitution of India
- Chief Minister of Tamil Nadu
- Dravidian movement
