= Article One =

Article One may refer to:

== Law ==
- Article One of the United States Constitution, pertaining to the powers of Congress
- Article One, of the Constitution of India, pertaining to the federal nature of the republic; See Part I of the Constitution of India#Articles 1 & 2
- Article 1 of the Constitution of the Fifth French Republic
- Article 1 of the European Convention on Human Rights
- Article One of the Constitution of Georgia (U.S. state)

== Other uses ==
- Article One (band), a Canadian Christian rock band
- Article One (political party), an Italian political party
- Article One Partners, an online patent research formation

== See also ==
- Article (disambiguation)
