= Kenya–Singapore relations =

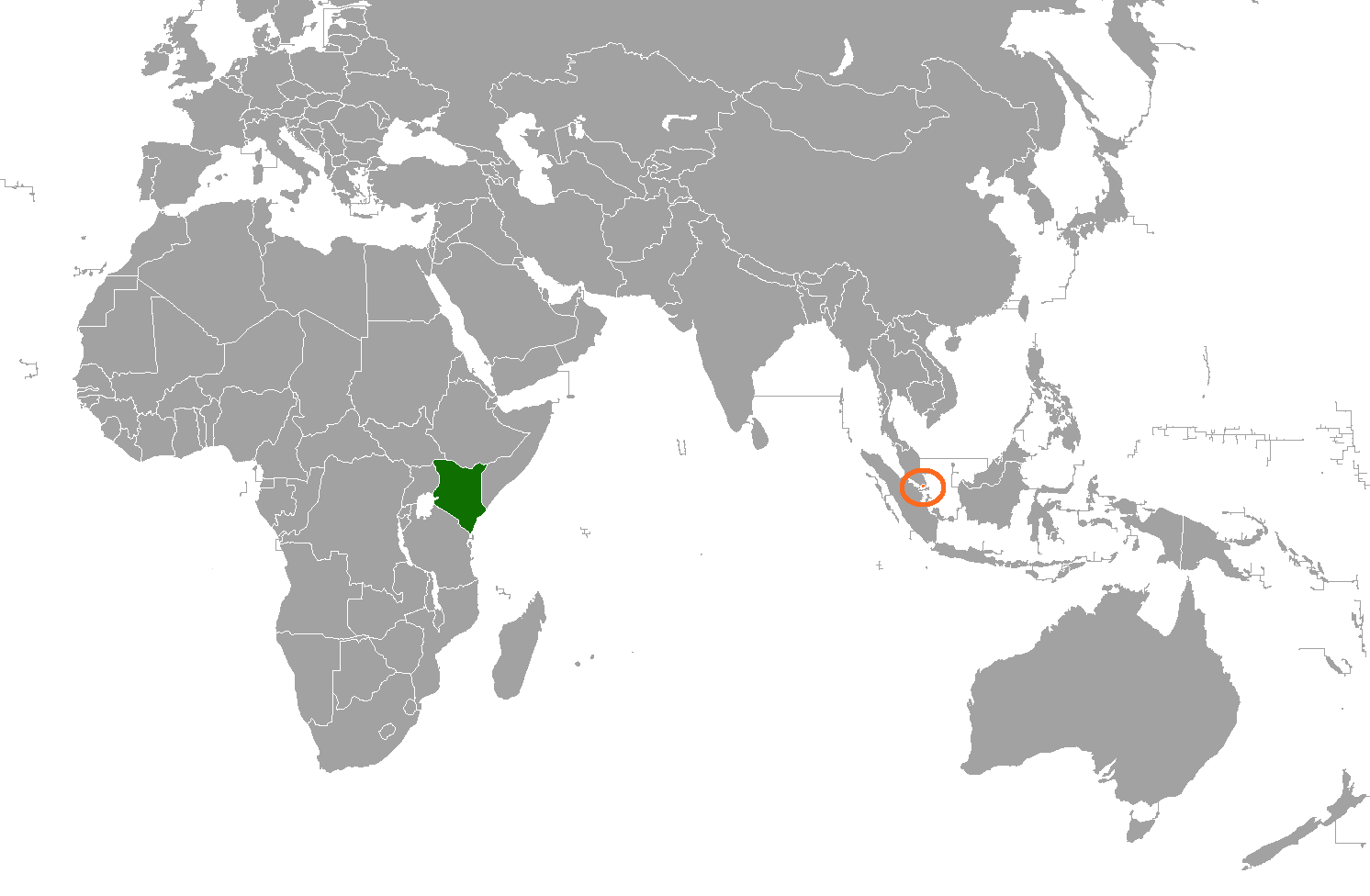
- Kenya: Singapore

Kenya–Singapore relations are the bilateral relations between Kenya and Singapore. Both countries are members of the Commonwealth of Nations. Diplomatic relations were established in 1991.

Kenya and Singapore enjoys strong bilateral relations with partnerships in cybersecurity, trade and knowledge sharing and skills development.

== History ==
=== Bilateral Agreements between Singapore and Kenya ===
In June 2018, Singapore and Kenya jointly signed two agreements, namely:

- The Bilateral Investment Treaty, which aims to promote greater investment flows between the 2 countries by protecting the interests of their investors, and
- Singapore- Kenya Double Tax Agreement, which provides relief from double taxation in the situation where income is subject to tax for both countries.

The signings took place in Kenya between Senior Minister of State for Trade and Industry Koh Poh Koon and Cabinet Secretary of the Treasury Henry Rotich.

These treaties were ratified in 2023, during Prime Minister Lee Hsien Loong’s working visit to Nairobi.

In September 2024, Singapore and Kenya signed a new Double Taxation Agreement, officially called the Elimination of Double Taxation with respect to Taxes on Income and the Prevention of Tax Evasion and Avoidance. The agreement was signed by Vivian Balakrishnan and Musalia Mudavadi on the sidelines of the UN General Assembly in New York. The treaty was designed to reduce tax barriers, clarify taxing rights, prevent double taxation, and encourage cross-border investment. The agreement was approved by the Kenyan Cabinet in February 2025, and entered into force on 20 April 2026. This new DTA also superseded the 2018 Agreement.

=== Fintech Cooperation Agreement ===
In July 2019, the Central Bank of Kenya and the Monetary Authority of Singapore signed the FinTech Cooperation Agreement, to support digital infrastructure development in Kenya.The two central banks agreed to collaborate to develop basic digital infrastructure services for Kenya, including identity, data and Know-Your-Customer utility, based on a set of common standards. The cooperation was sealed at the inaugural Afro-Asia FinTech Festival in Nairobi, Kenya, which drew close to 2,000 participants from all over the world. The agreement was signed by Dr Patrick Njoroge, Governor of CBK, and Mr Ravi Menon, Managing Director of MAS, on the sidelines of the Festival. The signing was witnessed by Mr Uhuru Kenyatta, the President of Kenya and Mr Tharman Shanmugaratnam, Senior Minister and Chairman of MAS.

=== Singapore Summit 2019 ===
In September 2019, the President of Kenya, Uhuru Kenyatta, visited Singapore for the Singapore Summit 2019, which was held at the Shangri-La Hotel.

During this visit, he met and held talks with Prime Minister Lee Hsien Loong, to strengthen trade, diplomatic and economic ties. Singapore has provided capacity‑building support to Kenyan professionals through the Singapore Cooperation Programme, which offers training in public administration, finance, urban development, and other areas. Kenyan officials and students have also participated in short‑term scholarships and exchange programs in Singapore, particularly in fields such as aviation management and port logistics. The two countries continue to cooperate within multilateral platforms such as the United Nations and the Commonwealth of Nations, often sharing common positions on sustainable development and trade facilitation.

=== 30th Anniversary of diplomatic relations ===
In 2021, Singapore and Kenya celebrated its 30th anniversary of diplomatic relations.

=== PM Lee’s Official Visit to Kenya (May 2023) ===
Prime Minister Lee Hsien Loong visited Kenya in May 2023, where he was hosted by President William Ruto. During this visit, Singapore and Kenya signed three memoranda of understanding (MOUs) covering climate cooperation, digital economy cooperation, and skills development.

The climate cooperation agreement established a framework for collaboration on carbon credits and greenhouse gas reduction under Article 6 of the United Nations' Paris Agreement.

The digital economy and skills development agreements expanded bilateral cooperation in areas including cybersecurity, information and communications technology, knowledge-sharing, and capacity-building.

Both governments reaffirmed their commitment to multilateralism, a rules-based international order, sustainable development, and cooperation on issues such as food security, energy security, and climate change.

Singapore and Kenya also highlighted growing economic ties. Bilateral trade had increased approximately 2.5 times since 2017, reaching over S$212 million in 2022. Singaporean firms were active in Kenya in sectors including shipping, logistics, port management, agribusiness, hospitality, and financial technology.

Both countries expressed interest in expanding cooperation further, including in public housing, transport, logistics, investment, and regional market access. Kenya viewed Singapore as a model for governance and economic development, while Singapore saw Kenya as a gateway to East Africa.

=== 2026 Developments ===
In March 2026, Kenyan President William Ruto publicly reaffirmed Kenya’s commitment to deeper ties with Singapore while meeting Singapore’s Non-Resident High Commissioner, Ernest Kan. He highlighted cooperation in trade, infrastructure, logistics, digital transformation, and human-capital development.

Also in March 2026, on the sidelines of the Global Fraud Summit in Vienna, Austria, Kipchumba Murkomen, Cabinet Secretary for Roads and Transport, held bilateral talks with Edwin Tong, Minister for Law and Second Minister for Home Affairs of Singapore, to explore opportunities for collaboration in security, national coordination and institutional capacity building, to establish the Nairobi Metropolitan Police Unit.

== Trade ==
Total trade is approximately KES. 6.1 billion (US$61.3 million) S$85.4 million in 2017.

Kenya exported goods worth KES. 1 billion (US$10 million) S$13.9 million to Singapore. Singapore exported goods worth KES. 5.16 billion (US$51.3 million) S$71.4 million.

Kenya's main exports to Singapore include: tea, fruits, nuts and vegetables.

Singapore's main exports to Kenya include: synthetic fibers and polymers.

Enterprise Singapore opened its 3rd Sub-Saharan Africa office in Nairobi in 2018.

== Transport ==
During the Singapore Summit in 2019, President Uhuru Kenyatta mentioned feasibility studies for direct flights between Kenya and Singapore were ongoing.

== Diplomatic missions ==
Kenya's High Commission in New Delhi is accredited to Singapore. Singapore's mission to Kenya is based in Singapore.

== See also ==
- Foreign relations of Kenya
- Foreign relations of Singapore
