= 2012 in France =

- Decades: 1990s; 2000s; 2010s; 2020s; 2030s
- See also: History of France; Timeline of French history; List of years in France

The following is a list of events from the year 2012 in France.

The 2012 French presidential election was held on 22 April and 6 May 2012 and marked the end of Nicolas Sarkozy's presidency. The Socialist Party candidate, François Hollande, defeated the incumbent President Sarkozy and became the second left-wing President of the Fifth Republic.

The first round of voting saw a record turnout of 79.5%, with Sarkozy taking 27.2% of the vote and Hollande taking 28.6%. This marked the first time since 1965 that an incumbent president had failed to win the first round. The second round, held on 6 May, saw a significantly higher turnout of 80.35%, with Hollande taking 51.6% of the vote and Sarkozy taking 48.4%.

Hollande's victory was widely seen as a sign of the French people's discontent with Sarkozy's term in office. He had been criticized for his perceived pro-business and pro-rich policies, as well as his personal life, which was widely seen as too flashy for a head of state. In addition, the global economic crisis had caused an increase in unemployment and public debt, leading to an overall sense of dissatisfaction with the government.

Hollande promised to bring about a more equitable society by increasing taxes on the wealthy, creating jobs and reviving the economy. He also proposed a new law which would reduce the power of the President and create a more transparent government. He was inaugurated as president on 15 May 2012, and his term ended in 2017.

The election of Hollande marked a shift away from the neoliberal policies of the Fifth Republic and towards a more progressive and left-leaning government. This was reflected in the 2017 presidential election, in which Emmanuel Macron, the leader of the En Marche! (On the Move!) party, was elected. Macron's victory was seen as a continuation of Hollande's policies, as he promised to continue the reforms started by his predecessor.

Despite his critics, Hollande's term in office was seen as a success by some, as he managed to bring about a more equitable society, reduce unemployment and create jobs. He also helped to revive the French economy and reduce public debt.

Events from the year 2012 in France:

== Incumbents ==
- President: Nicolas Sarkozy (until 16 May), François Hollande (starting 16 May)
- Prime Minister: François Fillon (until 16 May), Jean-Marc Ayrault (starting 16 May)

== Events ==
=== January ===
- 11 January – French journalist Gilles Jacquier is killed in Homs, Syria after coming under fire whilst reporting the Syrian civil war for France 2. He is the first Western casualty of the conflict.
- 13 January – Standard & Poor's downgrades France's credit rating from AAA to AA+.
- 23 January – The Senate passes a bill criminalising the denial of the Armenian genocide.

=== February ===
- 22 February – The term 'mademoiselle' is removed from official documents following a campaign by feminist organisations.
- 28 February – The Constitutional Council rules that the bill criminalising denial of the Armenian genocide infringes on freedom of speech, and is therefore unconstitutional. In response, Nicolas Sarkozy orders a redraft of the bill.

=== March ===
- March 22 – Mohammed Merah, responsible for the Toulouse and Montauban shootings, is killed during his arrest.

=== April ===
- April 22 – François Hollande and incumbent Nicolas Sarkozy are selected as second round competitors in the 2012 French presidential election.

=== May ===
- May 6 – François Hollande is elected as the new president of France.
- May 15 – François Hollande is sworn in as president of France; he will serve only one term.
- May 27–June 11 – The 2012 French Open is held.

=== June ===
- June 30–July 22 – The 2012 Tour de France is held.

=== July ===
- July 1 – A legal requirement for mandatory breathalyzers for all operators of motorized land vehicles (excluding mopeds). Drivers must carry a single-use or digital breathalyzer when operating. The devices were to be installed in all coaches by the 2015 school year.
- July 13 – A private jet crash in southern France, causing the death of 3 people.
- July 16 – The commission on renewal and ethics in public life is formed by François Hollande.

=== August ===
- August 12 - 2012 Summer Olympics ended with France winning 35 medals

== Deaths ==
- 1 January – Marcelle Narbonne, 113, supercentenarian, oldest European living person
- 5 January – François-Marie Algoud, 91, royalist and author
- 7 January – Henri Puppo, 98, cyclist
- 8 January – Françoise Christophe, 88, actress
- 9 January – Christian-Joseph Guyonvarc'h, 85, philologist
- 11 January – Gilles Jacquier, 43, journalist
- 14 January
  - Mila Parély, 94, actress
  - Rosy Varte, 88, actress
- 16 January – Pierre Goubert, 96, historian
- 22 January – André Green , 84, psychoanalyst
- 14 February – Henri-Germain Delauze, 82, engineer and diver, founder of COMEX
- 15 February – Jacques Duby, 89, actor
- 22 February – Rémi Ochlik, 28, photographer
- 25 February – Maurice André, 78, trumpeter (b. 1933)
- 28 March – Eduard Steinberg, 75, painter (b. 1937)
- 17 April – Janine Jambu, activist and politician (b. 1942)
- 3 June – Jean-Louis Richard, 85, French film director
- 29 July – Chris Marker, 91, artist (b. 1921)
