= François-Marie =

François-Marie is a French masculine given name, and may refer to:

- Auguste François-Marie de Colbert-Chabanais (1777-1809), French general
- François-Marie, 1st duc de Broglie (1671-1745), French diplomat
- François-Marie, comte de Broglie (1611-1656), French soldier
- François-Marie, marquis de Barthélemy (1747-1830), French politician and diplomat
- François-Marie Algoud (1920-2012), French writer
- François-Marie Arouet (a.k.a.: Voltaire; 1694-1778), French Enlightenment writer, essayist, Freemason, deist and philosopher
- François-Marie Bissot, Sieur de Vincennes (1700-1736), French Canadian explorer
- François-Marie Luzel (1826-1895), French folklorist
- François-Marie Perrot (1644-1691), French governor of Acadia
- François-Marie Picoté de Belestre (circa 1716-1793), French military leader
- François-Marie Raoult (1830-1901), French chemist
- François-Marie Treyve (1847-1906), French landscape gardener

== See also ==
- Armand-François-Marie
- François Marie (disambiguation)
- François-Marie-Benjamin
- François-Marie-Thomas
- Jean-François-Marie
- Marie-François
