= Tamil Nadu Day =

Indian state commemoration day

- Observed by: Tamil Nadu, India
- Type: Foundation Day
- Significance: commemorate the formation of the Tamil Nadu state.
- Date: 1 November
- Next time: 1 November 2026
- Frequency: Annual

Tamil Nadu Day (Tamil: Tamil Nadu Naal) is a Foundation Day celebrated annually on November 1 marks the date in 1956 when the erstwhile Madras State was formed under the States Reorganisation Act

== History ==
After the Independence of India in 1947, the erstwhile Madras Presidency became the Madras Province, which later became the Madras state, after India became a India became republic on 26 January 1950. Andhra state was split from the state in 1953 and the state was drawn into the current shape when the states were reorganised linguistically in 1956.

In 1956, Independence activist Sankaralinganar died on a hunger strike with a set of demands including a proposal to change the name of Madras State to Tamil Nadu. On 7 May 1957, the Dravida Munnetra Kazhagam (DMK) moved a resolution to rename the state in the Madras Legislative Assembly, which was defeated. Another resolution bought by the Socialist Party on 30 January 1961 was delayed by the Indian National Congress-led government and was not taken for discussion. Bhupesh Gupta of the Communist Party of India moved a bill in the Parliament of India to enact a change of name, which was defeated despite support from the members from the state. A third such resolution was tabled in the Madras Assembly on 23 July 1963 by Arangannal, which was opposed by the ruling Congress led by M. Bhaktavatsalam.

By then After the DMK came to power by winning the 1967 Madras Legislative Assembly election, Chief Minister C. N. Annadurai moved a resolution in the state assembly to rename the state on 18 July 1967. Despite initial opposition from the Congress, the bill was passed in the assembly. On 14 January 1969, The state was renamed Tamil Nadu, restoring its historical name as attested in Sangam literature.

In 2019, the Government of Tamil Nadu, led by Edappadi K Palaniswami of the All India Anna Dravida Munnetra Kazhagam, announced that 1 November will be celebrated annually as "Tamil Nadu Day" from 2019 to commemorate the formation of the state. However, in July 2022, the state government led by DMK's M. K. Stalin, announced that the state day would be celebrated on 18 July annually to mark the resolution passing the renaming of the state.

In 2026, the Government of Tamil Nadu, led by C. Joseph Vijay of the Tamilaga Vettri Kazhagam, announced that 1 November will be celebrated annually as "Tamil Nadu Day" from 2026 to commemorate the formation of the state (as previously designated by the AIADMK govt in 2019)
