= Article Two =

Article Two may refer to:

== Law ==
- Article 2, of the Constitution of India, concerning the establishment or admission of states
- Article Two of the United States Constitution
- Article Two of the Constitution of Georgia (U.S. state)
- Article 2 of the European Convention on Human Rights
- Bill of Rights of Puerto Rico, Article Two of the Constitution of Puerto Rico
- Article 2 of the Constitution of Ireland
- Article 2 of the Constitution of the Fifth French Republic
