= Article 1 of the Constitution of the Fifth French Republic =

Core principles of the Fifth Republic

Article 1 of the Constitution of 4 October 1958
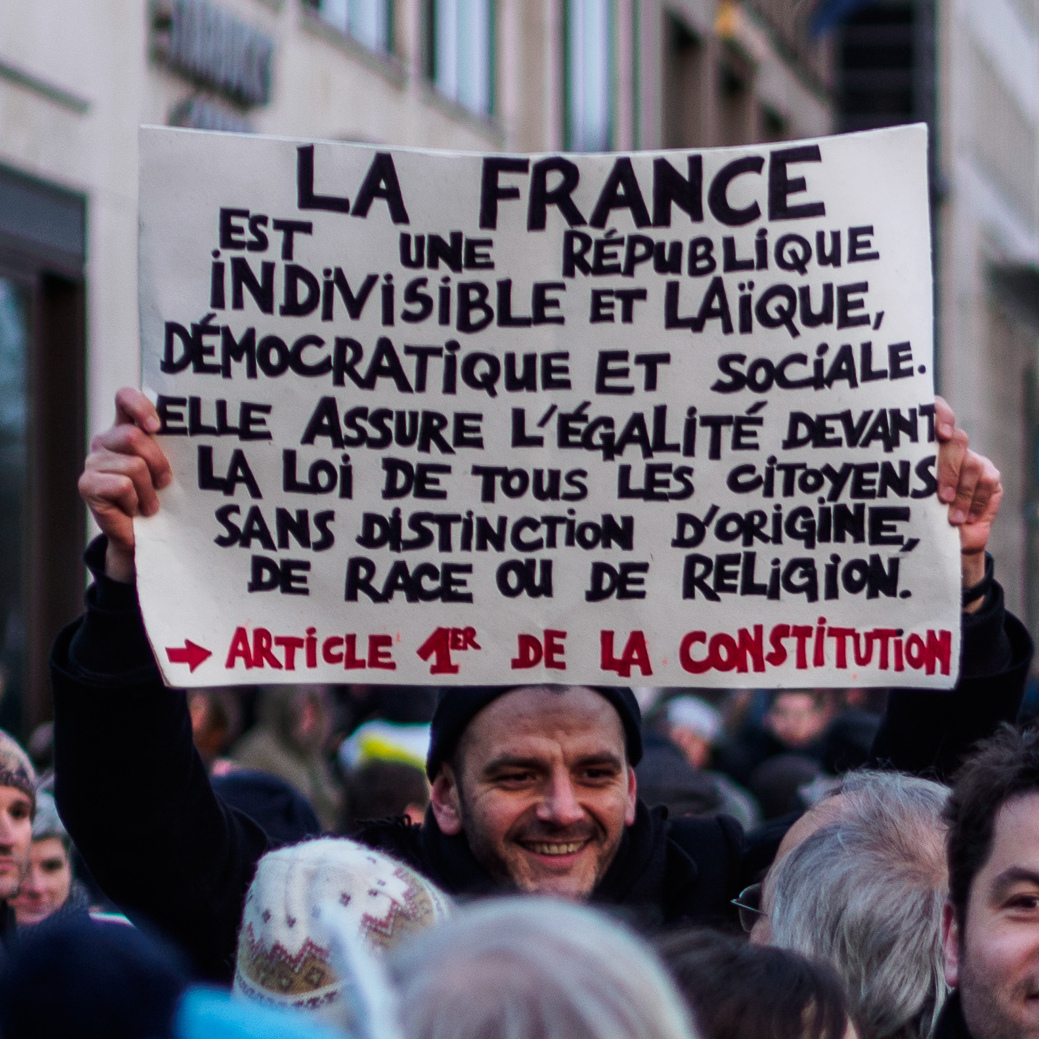
- Reference to Article 1 on a placard raised during a demonstration in 2015
- Effective: 5 October 1958

Article 1 of the Constitution of the French Fifth Republic delineates the core principles of the French Fifth Republic, effective since the transition to the Fifth Republic on 5 October 1958.

== Text ==
France shall be an indivisible, secular, democratic, and social Republic. It guarantees equality before the law in French legislation for all citizens, without distinction of origin, race, or religion. It respects all beliefs. Its organization is decentralized. The law promotes equal access for women and men to elective mandates and offices, as well as to professional and social responsibilities.

Text of the Constitution in force on the Constitutional Council website.

=== First paragraph ===
The first sentence reproduces word for word article 1 of the Constitution of 27 October 1946.

The initial three sentences of this paragraph were originally part of Article 2 until their reassignment in 1995.

The final sentence, affirming the Republic’s decentralized structure, was incorporated through the constitutional revision of March 2003.

=== Second paragraph ===
The second paragraph was introduced by the Constitutional Act of 23 July 2008. It expands upon and refines a provision previously found in Article 3.

=== Original wording ===
Initially, Article 1 addressed the Community, a legal framework devised by the 1958 drafters but never fully implemented:

The Republic and the peoples of the overseas territories who, by an act of free determination, adopt this Constitution, establish a Community. The Community is founded on the equality and solidarity of the people composing it.

This version, along with other provisions related to the Community, was repealed by the constitutional revision of 4 August 1995.

== Applications ==
=== Indivisibility of the Republic ===
The constitutional principle of indivisibility establishes France as comprising a single, undivided people. This was affirmed in the Constitutional Council's 9 May 1991 decision regarding Corsica, which ruled that recognizing a distinct Corsican people would violate Article 1 of the 1958 Constitution. The Council grounded its interpretation in France's constitutional tradition of "the French people, composed of all French citizens without distinction of origin, race, or religion."

This principle operates alongside Article 72-3's recognition of overseas populations within the French people, creating a legal framework that prohibits collective rights for specific groups, as demonstrated by the 1999 rejection of the European Charter for Regional or Minority Languages, maintains French as the sole official language under Article 2 and preserves territorial integrity while accommodating self-determination processes under Article 77 for New Caledonia.

Key judicial applications include:

- The 2002 ruling affirming indivisibility applies to all territory under French sovereignty
- The 2010 decision rejecting regional language recognition in education

This framework continues to evolve through constitutional jurisprudence while maintaining core republican principles.

=== Secularism of the Republic ===
Article 1 of the French Constitution formally establishes the secular character of the Republic while recognizing specific historical exceptions that continue to operate within the legal framework. The most notable exception is found in Alsace and Moselle, where the local legal regime maintains provisions of the 1801 Concordat due to the region's historical circumstances. When the 1905 law separating church and state was enacted, Alsace-Moselle was under German administration, preventing the application of this legislation.

The Constitutional Council affirmed the constitutionality of this exception in its 21 February 2013 decision (2012-297 QPC), ruling that the preparatory works for both the 1946 and 1958 Constitutions demonstrated the framers' intent to preserve existing special arrangements regarding religious organization in certain territories, including the remuneration of clergy through public funds. This maintains the Concordat system whereby the state provides salaries for ministers of four recognized faiths: Catholicism, Lutheranism, Calvinism, and Judaism.

The principle of secularism also accommodates other territorial exceptions, particularly in overseas departments. French Guiana continues to operate under an 1828 royal ordinance that grants the Catholic Church privileged status, while other overseas territories apply the Mandel Decrees that permit certain forms of state support for religious activities.

These exceptions coexist with the fundamental constitutional principle of laïcité, which requires state neutrality in religious matters while guaranteeing the free exercise of belief, provided such practices do not disturb public order. The Constitutional Council has consistently upheld this balance, notably in its 2013 decision which confirmed that the declaration of France as a "secular Republic" in Article 1 was not intended to invalidate pre-existing special arrangements in certain regions.

The constitutional framework of secularism has continued to evolve through jurisprudence and legislation. In 2021, the legislature passed measures to strengthen the application of secular principles in education (Law No. 2021-1109), while the Constitutional Council reaffirmed the special status of Alsace-Moselle in its 2 June 2023 decision (2023-858 QPC).

==== Equality ====
The concept of equality is also reflected in the motto in Article 2 of the Constitution and in the Declaration of the Rights of Man and of the Citizen of 1789. However, this principle is limited according to jurisprudence: equality may be breached for the general interest (2005-514 DC) or for experiments (2004-503 DC), applies only in identical situations (93-325 DC), primarily concerns legal situations (81-134 DC), with exceptions (82-143 DC), and must be closely tied to the law with rational criteria (98-397 DC and 91-298 DC). These decisions render ethnic criteria or affirmative action unconstitutional.

=== "Race" and prohibition of ethnic statistics ===
The inclusion of the word "race" in Article 1 of the French Constitution has generated intense and ongoing debate across the political spectrum since the 1990s. Despite multiple legislative attempts to remove or modify this term beginning in the early 2000s, all proposals for constitutional revision have ultimately failed to pass.

This controversy stems from the complex and contested meanings of the French word "race," which simultaneously functions as: a common colloquial term referring to physical characteristics; a technical biological classification (though largely discredited in contemporary science); a foundational concept for racist ideologies; a painful reminder of France's Vichy-era racial policies during the Holocaust; and a potentially useful sociological and legal tool for combating discrimination.

This semantic ambiguity has created deep divisions among anti-racism advocates and policymakers. Proponents of removing the term argue it perpetuates scientifically discredited biological determinism and evokes traumatic historical memories of state-sponsored racial discrimination. Conversely, opponents of removal maintain that the constitutional reference provides crucial legal protection against racial discrimination.

The Constitutional Council's landmark 2007 decision (2007-557 DC) regarding immigration legislation reinforced this tension by interpreting Article 1's prohibition on racial distinctions as banning all ethnic or racial data collection - including for academic research or anti-discrimination purposes. This interpretation has created significant challenges for researchers studying racial inequalities in France.

Recent developments include President Macron's 2022 announcement to pursue constitutional revision, though concrete progress remains stalled. The debate encapsulates fundamental tensions between France's universalist ideals and the practical challenges of addressing racial inequality in contemporary society.

== Decentralization ==
The principle of decentralization was formally added to Article 1 of the French Constitution through the constitutional revision of 2003, marking a significant evolution in France's territorial organization. This amendment established that "the organization of the Republic is decentralized," recognizing the growing importance of local and regional authorities in France's governance structure.

The 2003 reform represented the culmination of a process that began with the initial decentralization laws of 1982-1983, significantly expanding the powers and autonomy of territorial collectivities. It constitutionalized principles that had previously existed only at the legislative level, giving them stronger legal protection against reversal.

Key features of the constitutionalized decentralization include:

- Recognition of the regions as full territorial collectivities alongside departments and communes;
- Introduction of the principle of subsidiarity in French constitutional law;
- Constitutional protection for local authorities' financial autonomy;
- Establishment of mechanisms for experimental devolution of powers;

The Constitutional Council has since interpreted this provision as establishing decentralization as a fundamental constitutional principle, while allowing Parliament significant discretion in its implementation. Subsequent reforms, including the NOTRe Law of 2015, have further developed this constitutional framework.

== See also ==
- Constitution of 4 October 1958
- French Fifth Republic
- Secularism in France
- Decentralization in France
- Article 2 of the Constitution of the Fifth French Republic
