= Article 2 of the Constitution of the Fifth French Republic =

1958 law with a 1992 addition

Article 2 of the Constitution of the French Fifth Republic

III Legislature of the French Fourth Republic
- Territorial extent: France
- Enacted by: III Legislature of the French Fourth Republic
- Enacted: 4 October 1958
- Commenced: 5 October 1958

Related legislation
- Article 1 of the Constitution of the French Fifth Republic, Article 3 of the Constitution of the French Fifth Republic

Summary
- Constitutional article defining France's official language (French), national symbols, motto, and principle of government, passed under Charles de Gaulle's third government and published on 5 October 1958.

Article 2 of the Constitution of the French Fifth Republic establishes the official language, national symbols, motto, and principle of government of the French Republic, effective since the establishment of the Fifth Republic on 5 October 1958.

== Text ==
The language of the Republic is French.

The national emblem is the tricolor flag, blue, white, red.

The national anthem is La Marseillaise.

The motto of the Republic is Liberté, Égalité, Fraternité.

Its principle is: government of the people, by the people, and for the people.

— Article 2 of the Constitution

== History ==
Article 2 largely adopts provisions from Article 2 of the Constitution of 27 October 1946, which stated:

The national emblem is the tricolor flag, blue, white, red, with three vertical stripes of equal width.

The national anthem is La Marseillaise.

The motto of the Republic is: "Liberté, Égalité, Fraternité."

Its principle is: government of the people, for the people, and by the people.

— Constitution of the French Fourth Republic

The constitutional amendment of 25 June 1992 added the first paragraph, designating French as the Republic’s official language.

Originally, Article 2 included the statement: "France is an indivisible, secular, democratic, and social Republic. It ensures equality before the law for all citizens without distinction of origin, race, or religion. It respects all beliefs." This was moved to Article 1 by the constitutional amendment of 4 August 1995.

== Application ==
=== Official language ===
The first paragraph, "The language of the Republic is French," was introduced by the constitutional amendment of 25 June 1992, prompted by the Treaty of Maastricht. During parliamentary debates, the Minister of Justice assured legislators that this provision would not undermine regional languages.

==== Toubon Law ====
The Toubon Law of 1994 and its implementing decree of 3 July 1996 reinforce this paragraph by mandating French in public communications. The Constitutional Council partially struck down the law, ruling that imposing official terminology on private individuals or media violates freedom of expression, thus limiting the scope of Article 2.

==== Constitutional jurisprudence ====
The Constitutional Council has interpreted the first paragraph of Article 2 through several landmark decisions:

===== Corsica territorial status (1991) =====
On 9 May 1991, the Council reviewed a law authorizing the Corsican Territorial Assembly to establish “a plan for the development of teaching the Corsican language and culture.” Although the first paragraph of Article 2 was not yet in force (introduced in 1992), the Council ruled that teaching Corsican is constitutional and consistent with the principle of equality, provided it is not mandatory.

===== French Polynesia autonomy (1996) =====
On 9 April 1996, after the first paragraph had entered into force, the Council issued its first ruling on Article 2. It held that the requirement to use French applies only to “public legal entities and private entities performing a public service mission, as well as users in their interactions with administrations and public services.” Any broader interpretation would be unconstitutional. Consequently, the legislature may authorize teaching the Tahitian language and culture in French Polynesia’s regular school curriculum without violating the Constitution, provided such teaching is not mandatory for all students, in accordance with the principle of equality.

===== European Charter for Regional or Minority Languages (1999) =====
In 1999, under Article 54, the Council examined the constitutionality of the European Charter for Regional or Minority Languages. It ruled that certain Charter provisions were unconstitutional because they “tend to recognize a right to use a language other than French not only in ‘private life’ but also in ‘public life,’ including justice, administrative authorities, and public services.” However, the Council noted that “none of the other commitments undertaken by France, most of which merely recognize practices already implemented in favor of regional languages, are unconstitutional given their nature.” Thus, only the Charter’s objectives and principles were deemed unconstitutional, while its practical measures were compliant. Ratifying the entire Charter would require amending both Article 2 and Article 1, as the Charter also undermines “the principles of the indivisibility of the Republic, equality before the law, and the unity of the French people,” according to the Council.

===== London Protocol on European patents (2006) =====
The London Protocol aimed to reduce translation requirements for validating European patents, making full translations non-mandatory. As the protocol required parliamentary approval, it sparked debates in the National Assembly and Senate. On 28 September 2006, the Council ruled on its constitutionality, reaffirming that the French language requirement applies only to public legal entities and private entities in public service roles. Since legal relationships between patent holders and third parties are purely private, the protocol does not violate Article 2’s first paragraph.

===== Molac Law (2021) =====
The Council struck down two articles of a law proposed by Paul Molac to protect and promote regional languages, deeming them contrary to Article 2. It ruled that immersive education in regional languages in public or state-contracted schools and the use of regional language diacritics in civil status documents are unconstitutional. The United Nations Human Rights Council expressed concern, stating: “We fear that the adoption and application of this decision could lead to significant violations of the human rights of linguistic minorities in France.”

==== Administrative Jurisprudence ====
Article 2 has been invoked in judicial review cases concerning the use of regional languages:

Diwan Schools: The clause was cited in challenges to ministerial decisions refusing to integrate Diwan schools, which teach in the Breton language, into the public education system. The SNES and UNSA contested these refusals. On 29 November 2002, the Council of State issued two rulings, finding that integrating Diwan schools into the National Education system complies with the Constitution, including Article 2.

French Polynesia Assembly: On 29 March 2006, the Council of State annulled a regulation permitting the use of Tahitian alongside French in the deliberations of the Territorial Assembly of French Polynesia, citing Article 2. Despite this ruling, practices did not change immediately. Consequently, the National Assembly adopted an amendment on the night of 22–23 November 2007, explicitly prohibiting Tahitian in Assembly deliberations, despite protests from Polynesians.

=== Proposed Constitutional Amendments ===
Several attempts have been made to revise the Constitution in relation to Article 2. On 9 September 2005, Deputy Daniel Mach submitted a constitutional bill to add Article 53-3, enabling France to ratify the European Charter for Regional or Minority Languages with an interpretive declaration. The proposal was neither assigned a rapporteur nor scheduled for debate.

On 13 December 2006, during a debate on a bill concerning New Caledonia, an amendment to Article 77 was proposed to insert “and in respect of regional languages that are part of our heritage” after “notably in respect of customary rights.” The amendment was rejected as a legislative rider by a vote of 26 to 24. François Baroin, then Minister for Overseas Territories, argued that the amendment “lacks normative impact and does not resolve issues regarding the ratification of the European Charter for Regional or Minority Languages.”

The constitutional amendment of 23 July 2008 recognized regional languages, but in Article 75-1, not Article 2. This provision was included in the original 1958 Constitution.

=== National flag ===
The second paragraph of Article 2 (“The national emblem is the tricolor, blue, white and red flag”) specifies the official emblem of France. It has been the sole emblem of France since 1830, and was included in the original 1958 text.

Law for internal security decision

Article 113 of the Internal Security Act created an offence of public contempt for the national anthem or the tricolor flag, punishable by a €7,500 fine. Referred to by 60 deputies and 60 senators, the Constitutional Council issued an interpretative reservation to this provision, considering “that works of the mind, comments made in a private circle, and acts carried out during events not organized or regulated by the public authorities are excluded from the scope of the criticized article”, in order to reconcile this incrimination, deemed sufficiently clear and precise, with “the guarantee of constitutionally protected freedoms”. The offence would therefore only apply to “public sporting, recreational or cultural events taking place in enclosures subject to health and safety regulations by virtue of the number of people they accommodate”. Furthermore, the French Constitutional Court found that the fine was not manifestly disproportionate.

The law is now in force, and the offence can be found in the French Penal Code.

=== National anthem ===
La Marseillaise was declared the national song on 14 July 1795 (26 Messidor Year III) by the Convention, following the Committee of Public Safety’s proposal. It was replaced by the Chant du départ under the First Empire in 1804, restored during the July Revolution of 1830, and officially adopted as the national anthem by the Third Republic on 14 February 1879. An official version was established in 1887 for the French Revolution centennial.

During the Vichy regime, La Marseillaise remained the official anthem but was often overshadowed by Maréchal, nous voilà!. The Fourth Republic in 1946 and the Fifth Republic in 1958 reaffirmed its status in Article 2. President Valéry Giscard d’Estaing adjusted its tempo in the 1970s to match its original rhythm, with the current version derived from the 1887 arrangement.

=== National motto ===
The fourth paragraph establishes Liberté, Égalité, Fraternité as the Republic’s motto, a principle rooted in the French Revolution. On 13 January 2004, Deputy Franck Marlin proposed a constitutional amendment to add “Laïcité” to the motto, but the proposal was not adopted.

=== Principle of Government ===
The fifth paragraph adopts the principle of “government of the people, by the people, and for the people,” echoing Abraham Lincoln’s Gettysburg Address. This phrase, with slight preposition differences, appeared in the 1946 Constitution. Constitutional scholar Guy Carcassonne criticized it as rhetorically grand but imprecise, citing Seneca’s “Plus sonat quam valet” (more sound than substance).

== See also ==
- Constitution of the French Fifth Republic
- National symbols of France
- Language policy in France
