= Article Three =

Article Three may refer to:

== Law ==
=== Constitutions ===
- Article Three of the United States Constitution
- First Amendment to the United States Constitution, which was also known as "Article the Third" or "The third article"
- Article 3, of the Constitution of India, establishment of new states and amendment of existing ones
- Article 3 of the Constitution of Ireland
- Article Three of the Constitution of Puerto Rico
- Article 3, of the North Atlantic Treaty which brought NATO into existence

=== Human rights ===
- Article 3 of the European Convention on Human Rights
- Common Article 3 of the Geneva Convention, 1949

== Other uses ==
- The Article 3, a musical album by Me'shell Ndegeocello

== See also ==
- Article (disambiguation)
