= Artical =

Artical may refer to:

- "Artical", a song by Roots Manuva from his 2001 album Run Come Save Me
- Artical, an occasional misspelling of "article"
