= François Marie =

François Marie may refer to:

- Charles François Marie Baron (20th century), French colonial governor
- François Marie, Prince of Lillebonne (1624–1694), French nobleman
- François Marie Daudin (1776–1803), French zoologist
- François Marie de Lorraine, Count of Maubec (1686–1706), French nobleman and son of Alphonse Henri, Count of Harcourt
- Louis François Marie Le Tellier (1668–1701), French statesman
- Maximilien François Marie Isidore de Robespierre (1758–1794), French lawyer and revolutionary
- Pierre François Marie Auguste Dejean (1780–1845), French entomologist
- François Marie, Chevalier de Reggio (1732–1787), Italian nobleman

== See also ==
- François-Marie
- Marie François
