= Article Five =

Article Five may refer to:

== Law ==
- Article 5 of the North Atlantic Treaty, which commits NATO member states to consider an armed attack against one member state to be one against them all
  - Article 5 contingency (2001), the invocation of NATO's collective self-defense provisions
- Article Five of the United States Constitution, which provides for amending the Constitution
- Article Five, of the Constitution of India, defining Indian nationality
- Article Five, of the Basic Law for the Federal Republic of Germany, about freedom of speech
- Article 5 of the European Convention on Human Rights, which provides that everyone has the right to liberty and security of person

== Other uses ==
- Article 5 (novel), by Kristen Simmons
