= Article One of the Constitution of Georgia (U.S. state) =

Georgia Bill of Rights
- Created: 21 March 1861
- Ratified: July 2009
- Author: Thomas R.R. Cobb
- Purpose: To set limits on what the government can and cannot do in regard to personal liberties, the origin and structure of government, general provisions and the recognition of marriage

Full text
- Georgia State Constitution (1976)#Article_I. - Bill of Rights at Wikisource

Article One of the Georgia State Constitution describes the Georgia Bill of Rights, a set of forty-three paragraphs which enumerate the Rights of Persons, the Origin and Structure of Government and other General Provisions. The Georgia Bill of Rights was written by Thomas R.R. Cobb under the title Declaration of Fundamental Principals, as part of the Georgia Constitution of 1861 when the State of Georgia seceded from the United States of America and joined the Confederate States of America.

The first Section, the Rights of Persons, lists twenty-eight paragraphs of individual rights. Many of these rights are similar to the rights listed in the United States Bill of Rights. Yet, there are differences. For instance, the Georgia Bill of Rights lists among its freedoms the Freedom of Conscience, which is the "natural and inalienable right to worship God, each according to the dictates of that person's own conscience" without interference and adds the right to religious opinion along with freedom of religion.

Section II describes the "origin and foundation of government" as well as the "object of government". The second Section goes on to include paragraphs on the separation of powers and the superiority of civil authority over military authority. Also, this section explicitly describes the separation of church and state.

Section III, General Provisions, deals with Eminent Domain, private ways and Tidewater titles.

Finally, Section IV, Marriage, describes how the state recognizes marriage between a man and a woman and prohibits marriage between persons of the same sex. This section has since been overturned by the Federal Court Ruling, Obergefell v. Hodges.

== Background ==
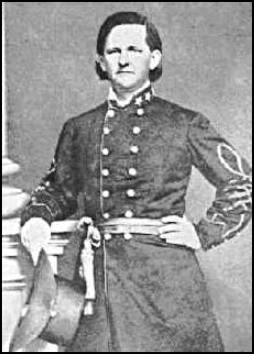
Thomas R.R. Cobb

The Georgia Bill of Rights was ratified, along with the Georgia Constitution of 1861, soon after the State of Georgia seceded from the Union on 18 January 1861. Prior to the creation of the Bill of Rights, Georgia's previous four Constitutions protected only a relative few civil liberties. With the end of the American Civil War in 1865 the abolition of slavery was added to the Bill of Rights in Section I, the Rights of Persons. Also added to that Section, in 1877, was a prohibition against whipping of criminals and banishment of criminals.

== See also ==
- Bill of rights
- United States Bill of Rights
