= Decentralisation in France =

In France, the policy of decentralisation was initiated by acts of the French Parliament known as Gaston Defferre laws in 1982. Prior to the new laws French municipalities and departments enjoyed a limited autonomy under laws passed in 1871 and 1884.

Decentralisation in France can be divided into three categories: institutional, territorial and functional decentralisation.

== Institutional ==
This is the process of transferring power to newly created institutions and is different from the act of deconcentration of power, which is the transfer of power within the same institution. This decentralisation is general in nature and affects all policies or powers related to the territory or targeted to specific areas of public policy and government. A further manifestation of this category is the decentralisation of the Banque de France and other public bodies (French: Groupement d'intérêt public).

== Territorial ==
This aspect of decentralisation is geared to giving the territorial collectivities in France separate defined responsibilities and resources and to provide for the election of representatives by the inhabitants of those territories. Again this is different from deconcentration, which is when the central government aims to improve efficiency by delegating certain policy and powers to a centrally nominated representative (Prefect).

The decentralisation laws passed on 10 August 1871 and 5 April 1884 saw the attribution of powers to departmental councils and municipal councils. Until the 1982 laws the departmental councils had very limited powers and were effectively under the stewardship of the departments’ prefects.

The 1982 law passed by the government of Pierre Mauroy introduced three new elements:

- The administrative stewardship of the Prefect was replaced by a legal check and balance exercised by the administrative courts and the regional courts of audit.
- Departmental Executive power transferred from the Prefect to the President of the departmental Council
- Creation of Regions with full powers and recognition as territorial Collectivities

The 1983 Laws (Gaston Defferre Laws) dating from 7 January and 22 July defined the responsibilities of the new bodies and how they would be financed.

These laws followed the first failed attempt at decentralisation (referendum to reform the senate and regionalisation) in 1969 by General De Gaulle.

In 2002 and 2004 the second stage of territorial decentralisation was set in motion by Jean-Pierre Raffarin. The 2003 change to the Constitution introduced the principle of financial autonomy of territorial Collectivities and saw the introduction of the words Region and Decentralisation in the French Constitution. The changes also introduced the possibility of holding local referendums and the right to petition.

The changes to the Constitution put in place the financial autonomy of the three levels of local government (commune, department and region) and the transfer to the regions of new responsibilities in 2004 and 2005.

- responsibility of non-teaching staff in schools
- professional training
- regional commuter rail transport

== Functional ==
This aspect of decentralisation takes place when central or local government decides not to directly carry out one of its powers but to transfer the power to a public body or quango.

In such a case the body has a clearly defined function and budget to carry out the function. Examples could be Universities or the RATP transport authority in Paris.

== Financial autonomy ==
=== Local taxes and duties ===
In 2006 47% (89 billion euros) of local spending was covered by taxes and duties set and raised locally. The main direct taxes are:

- Property tax
- Land tax
- Business tax

The main indirect taxes are:

- local amenities tax
- public transport contribution
- tourist tax
- advertising tax
- gambling tax
- ski-lift tax

=== Government transfers and grants ===
In 2006 this represented 33% (62 billion Euro) of local spending. The grants cover the increased spending of local authorities due to the transfer of responsibilities from the central to local government due to decentralisation.

The grants and transfers fall into 3 categories:

- grants and subsidies for current spending
- grants and subsidies for infrastructure
- compensation for transfer of responsibilities

The local authorities are free to spend these resources as they decide, however due to ever increasing costs of these grants a Stability Pact was put in place in 1996 and later replaced by a Growth and Solidarity pact in 1999.

=== Borrowing ===
Borrowing is the third biggest source of resources for local government in France. In 2006 it represented 9% (17 billion euros) of spending and has been in constant decline since 1997.

Local authorities do not need to seek central government authorisation in order to borrow money but all resources from borrowing can only be spent on investment (not current spending).

=== Other resources ===
The remainder of local Government resources (11%) come from rents, duties and European structural funds.

== Local government spending ==
Between 1982 and 2007 total spending by Local Government grew from 56 billion euros to 168 billion euros.

=== Current spending ===
In 2007 66% of total spending by Local Government was to cover current expenses, including:

- Salaries (41 billion euros)
- Debt servicing (4.2 billion euros)
- Supplies

=== Investment spending ===
Totaling 68 billion euros in 2007, it includes:

- Debt repayment (11.2 billion euros)
- New Infrastructure and property purchases

== See also ==
- Devolution
- Devolution in the United Kingdom
- Federalism in the United States
