= Eduard Steinberg =

Russian painter

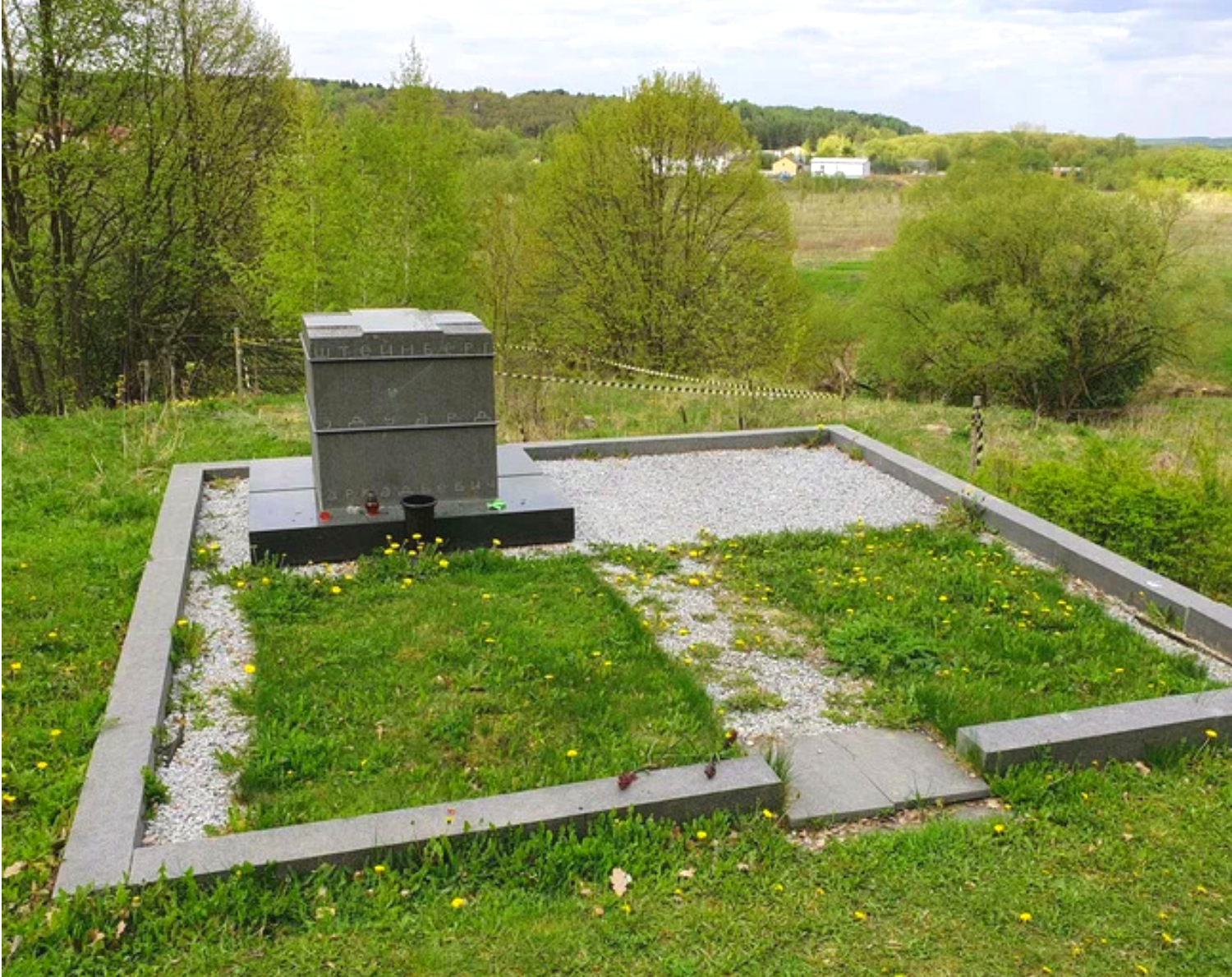
- Eduard Steinberg's Grave in Tarusa
- Born: 3 March 1937; Moscow, Russia
- Died: 28 March 2012 (aged 75); Paris, France
- Occupations: Painter, activist, philosopher
- Parent: Arkady Steinberg

Eduard Arkadevich Steinberg (Russian: Эдуа́рд Арка́дьевич Ште́йнберг, also named "Edik Steinberg"; 3 March 1937 – 28 March 2012) was a Russian and French suprematist painter, philosopher and activist.

== Biography ==
Steinberg was born in Moscow, the elder son of poet, translator and artist Arkady Steinberg. His younger brother Boris (Borukh) Steinberg (1938-2003) was also an avant-garde painter and art critic. He had residences in Tarusa (Kaluga region) and Paris. His wife, Galina Iosifovna Manevich (born 1939), is a Russian art critic, author and essayist.

Steinberg was born in 1937 - the key year of mass Stalinist political repressions in the USSR, which was also the year when his father Arkady Steinberg was arrested for the first time.

== Career ==
Steinberg began his career drawing live models and landscapes and later switched to "metaphysical still lifes".

In the 1960–1980s Steinberg participated in the dissident movement in the USSR, which supported freedom of expression in arts and basic human rights.

Steinberg became Honorary Members of the Russian Academy of Arts. Taking from the hands of Zurab Tsereteli a medal on a red ribbon, Steinberg said:

My personal fate may seem difficult and even incomprehensible, but in fact it is the exact parallel with the fate of my country, which managed to emerge from the depths of captivity and isolation to the heights of cultural rebirth and universal acceptance.

He also was Chevalier of the Order of Friendship (2008).

Steinberg died at his home in Paris from pneumonia on 28 March 2012.

== Steinberg’s collaboration with Joseph Brodsky ==
Steinberg was introduced to Joseph Brodsky, then still an aspiring poet, by his father, Arkady Steinberg, who had been told about Brodsky's talent by Anna Akhmatova. After Brodsky was expelled from the USSR in 1972, he continued to keep in touch with him through mutual acquaintances who lived in the United States and Israel. They met again when they were both living abroad - in 1993, after Elena Cardenas, after visiting Steinberg's exhibition at the Claude Bernard Gallery in March 1993, decided to publish a book consisting of Edik's lithographs and one previously unpublished poem by Joseph Brodsky, entitled "Persian Arrow", dedicated to his long-time friend Veronica Schiltz, a researcher of Eastern and ancient culture. This book was published in 1994 in Verona by Art Gibralfaro publishing house in the technique of intaglio printing, made by Anna Ziliotto, in a print run of 75 copies, each copy was personally signed by Brodsky and Steinberg. In connection with the presentation of this book in Verona and Venice, Steinberg traveled to Italy, and opened an exhibition of his works in Verona, timed to coincide with the publication of the book. As noted by the critic Galina Manevich, "Edik, who does not like and does not know how to travel, will feel in Italy as in his ancestral homeland. Some art critics noted the kinship of his early paintings with the canvases of Giorgio Morandi, as well as the special light of his works of the 70s, in which the light of the Florentine and Siena sky was felt."

== Steinberg’s collaboration with Manufacture de Sevres ==
In 2000, Manufacture de Sevres offered Steinberg to make several items at his discretion. Steinberg choose a vase and three plates. In 2011, a year before his death, he made a table set of six plates with a dish.

== Steinberg and Tarusa ==
Shortly after Steinberg's birth, he was brought to the town of Tarusa by his father, although he left the town after his father was arrested in 1937. During his “second coming” to Tarusa after the call of his father, he got his initiation as a painter and a young “Sixtier”, a member of tiny non-conformist layer of progressive independent Soviet intelligentsia which strived to preserve the free spirit of the first years that followed Stalin’s death and the end of the most evil era in the history of USSR. In Tarusa, Steinberg became acquainted with progressive writers and poets and philosophers such as Paustovsky, Schiffers, who served as guiding lights in his own spiritual searches.

Due to late-Brezhnev era repressions against intelligentsia and mass emigration of independent people from the USSR in 1970s and 1980s, the former favorable cultural climate of Tarusa had mostly evaporated, which made Steinberg’s comeback to the town problematic, because In the 1960s–1980s, Steinberg participated in the dissident movement in the USSR, which supported freedom of expression in art and basic human rights.

However, by the end of the 1990s a certain aura of the 1960s started to dawn again. Moscow's artistic elite was again drawn to Tarusa. Tarusa confirmed its reputation as “Russian Barbison on Oka river” as it once again became a popular place for many painters and artists. Those people brought about what was later called “The second revival of Tarusa” as a special cultural place on Russia’s map, a peculiar spot of free-thinking and inner freedom for many representatives of modern-day intelligentsia who were lacking those features in big cities, with their overpowering bureaucracy and rigid social order. The revival of Tarusa was marked by instituting annual autumn poetry readings in memory of Marina Tsvetaeva and the annual autumn festival of the great musician Svyatoslav Richter, which he himself inaugurated shortly before his death.

This created a new atmosphere in Tarusa which was much more favorable for Steinberg’s artistic search and developments. His own mansion at Paustovsky street where he lived and worked became a sort of art laboratory where he presided over meetings of like-minded person and confederates, who were immersed in art and its problems and future paths. Since his death in 2012, this mansion was made, in accordance with his will, into Tarusa branch of Pushkin Fine Art Museum. Now it houses art exhibitions and summer schools for aspiring young painters.

== Selected exhibitions ==
- 1992 : «The Square» Museum Center, Josef-Albers-Museum in Bottrop, Germany
- 1995 : Bochum Art Museum, Bochum, Germany
- 1999 : Morsbroich Museum, Leverkusen
- 2000 : Wilhelm-Hack-Museum of Modern and Contemporary Art, Ludwigshafen
- 2004 : State Russian Museum, Saint Petersburg
- 2005 : «Eduard Steinberg, Das Leben eines Dreiecks (Gouachen und Gemälde) 1970-2004», Galerie Sandmann, Berlin
- 2005 : «Russia!» – Solomon R. Guggenheim Museum, New York
- 2009 : Edik Steinberg at Gallery Claude Bernard, Paris (14 May – 27 June 2009)
- 2011—2012 : «Passion Bild», Kunstmuseum Bern
- 2012 : Religiöse Motive in der inoffiziellen Kunst der Sowjetunion

== References and sources ==
Sources

- Эдик Штейнберг. Материалы биографии. Очерки визуальности. Москва, Новое литературное обозрение, 2015 (Edik Steinberg. Biographical Materials. Essays on Visuality. Moscow, New Literary Review, 2015). ISBN 978-5-4448-0239-7
- Hans-Peter Riese. “Eduard Steinberg, Heaven and Earth: Reflections in Paints”. Palace Editions, 2004. ISBN 978-3-938051-02-3
- Hans-Peter Riese. “Eduard Steinberg: Monographie. Wienand Verlag, 1998. ISBN 978-3-87909-615-2”.
- Hans-Peter Riese. Ost/West: Eduard Steinberg zwischen Moskau und Paris. Wienand Verlag, 2015, ISBN 978-3-86832-248-4.
- Gerhard Lenz and Anna Lenz. “Epoche Zero”. Hatje Cantz Verlag, 2009. ISBN 978-3-7757-1688-8
- Anna Lenz. Strong Women for Art: In Conversation with Anna Lenz. Hirmer Publishers, 2013. ISBN 978-3-7774-2149-0.
- Vladimir A. Gusev und Evgenija Nikolaevna Petrova, Kiblickij Iozef (Hrsg.), Harry N. Abrams. "Russisches Museum : hundert Jahre nationale russische Schatzkammer. Staatliches Russisches Museum. Palace Edition, 1998. ISBN 978-3-930775-36-1.
- Basner, Elena V.; Kiblickij, Iozef. “I love Petersburg. The Russian Museum in Moscow. In celebration of the tercentenary of St. Petersburg”. St Petersurg, Palace Editions, 2003. ISBN 978-5-93332-106-4.
- Basner, Elena; Imanse, Geurt; Frank van Lamoen; Meylac, Michael; Sigey, Sergey. “Russian Avant-Garde: The Khardzhiev Collection at the Stedelijk Museum Amsterdam”. Nai010 publishers, 2014. ISBN 978-94-6208-104-8.
- Iozef Kiblickij (ed.). “Oscar Rabin - Three Lives: The Retrospective Exhibition”. Saint Petersburg, Palace Editions, 2008. ISBN 978-3-940761-25-5.
- «Другое Искусство». Москва. 1956—1988. ГАЛАРТ, Государственный центр современного искусства. М., 2005.
- Bernard Noël (ed.): “Une recherche minutieuse de la beauté éternelle, avec l'inspiration dans le cœur”. Editions Gründ, Paris, 2008.
- Marianna Stachowiak-Mieszkowska: “Nowa europejska seria suprematystyczna w sztuce i rzeźbie: ambitny początek”. Wydawnictwo Uniwersytetu Śląskiego, Katowice, 2014
- Gerthrude Spencer-Bloch. “Une nouvelle ouverture arrive bientôt. Pourquoi l'immédiateté de la perception dans la sphère de l'inconnu dans l'art”. Montpelier: Vilo Edigroup Verlag, 2018
- Елизавета Кузнецова. «Проблемы кураторов: горизонты нового искусства». Санкт-Петербург, издат. «Зеленая Амфора», 2021.
- Ольга Шихирева, Жан-Клад Маркаде, Морис Тухман, Александр Боровский и др. Abstraction in Russia. Catalog of exhibitions in the State Russian Museum / Anna Laks. — Sankt-Petersburg: Palace Editions, 2001. — 814 p. — (Государственный Русский музей (альманах)). — ISBN 978-5-93332-059-3.
- Dalya Alberge, Russian painters denounced as Soviet traitors exhibit in London, The Guardian, November 30, 2010.
- Одесса — Москва — Одесса. Юго-западный ветер в русской литературе. М., 2014.
- Карл Аймермахер, Евгений Барабанов, Александр Боровский, Галина Маневич и др. Нонконформисты. Second Russian avant-garde, 1955—1988. Собрание Бар-Гера / Ханс-Петер Ризе. — Cologne: Wienand, 1996. — P. 92—96. — 320 p. — ISBN 3879094960.
- Grobman M. About Malevich // The Avant-Garde in Russia 1910-1930: New Perspectives, Exhibition Catalogue, Los Angeles County Museum of Art, MIT Press, Cambridge, Massachusetts, 1980
- Тарханова, И.. Текстильщики. Гостевые тетради Михаила Гробмана. — М.: Барбарис, 2013.
