= Article 6 of the Constitution of Pakistan =

High treason clause of the Constitution of Pakistan

Article 6 of the Constitution of Pakistan is the constitutional provision defining high treason in Pakistan. It declares that any person who abrogates, subverts, suspends, or holds the Constitution in abeyance by unconstitutional means is guilty of high treason, and extends liability to persons who aid, abet, or collaborate in such acts. The article also directs Majlis-e-Shoora (Parliament) to provide punishment by law. Since the Eighteenth Amendment in 2010, Article 6 has additionally stated that acts of high treason may not be validated by any court, including the Supreme Court of Pakistan and the High Courts.

== Text ==
6. (1) Any person who abrogates or subverts or suspends or holds in abeyance, or attempts or conspires to abrogate or subvert or suspend or hold in abeyance, the Constitution by use of force or show of force or by any other unconstitutional means shall be guilty of high treason.

(2) Any person aiding or abetting or collaborating the acts mentioned in clause (1) shall likewise be guilty of high treason.
(2A) An act of high treason mentioned in clause (1) or clause (2) shall not be validated by any court including the Supreme Court and a High Court.

(3) Majlis-e-Shoora (Parliament) shall by law provide for the punishment of persons found guilty of high treason.

== Background ==
Article 6 formed part of the 1973 Constitution, which was passed by the National Assembly on April 10, 1973 and authenticated on April 12, 1973. Under clause (3), Parliament later enacted the High Treason (Punishment) Act, 1973, which made persons guilty of high treason punishable with death or imprisonment for life and provided that proceedings could begin only on a written complaint by a person authorised by the federal government.

== Amendment history ==
As originally enacted, Article 6 was narrower than its present form. It referred to abrogation or subversion of the Constitution, and to attempts or conspiracies to do so, but did not expressly mention suspension, holding the Constitution in abeyance, collaboration, or judicial validation.

The article was substantially expanded by the Eighteenth Amendment in 2010. That amendment substituted a new clause (1), inserted the word "collaborating" in clause (2), and added clause (2A), which bars the courts from validating acts of high treason. The amendment bill passed the National Assembly on April 8, 2010, the Senate on April 15, 2010, and received presidential assent on April 19, 2010.

Date	Measure	Effect on Article 6
April 1973	Adoption of the Constitution of Pakistan	Article 6 was enacted in its original form, criminalising abrogation or subversion of the Constitution and directing Parliament to provide punishment by law.
September 26, 1973	High Treason (Punishment) Act, 1973	Parliament prescribed punishment for high treason as death or imprisonment for life and laid down the complaint procedure.
April 19, 2010	Constitution (Eighteenth Amendment) Act, 2010	Expanded clause (1), added "collaborating" in clause (2), and inserted clause (2A) barring judicial validation of such acts.

== Judicial application ==
The most prominent litigation concerning Article 6 arose from the state of emergency declared on November 3, 2007 by Pervez Musharraf. On July 31, 2009, a 14-judge bench of the Supreme Court declared the Proclamation of Emergency, the Provisional Constitutional Order No. 1 of 2007, and a series of related orders unconstitutional, ultra vires, illegal, and of no legal effect.

On December 17, 2019, a special court convicted Musharraf of high treason under Article 6 and sentenced him to death. It was the first time in Pakistan's history that a former military ruler had been found guilty of high treason and handed a death sentence. On January 13, 2020, the Lahore High Court declared unconstitutional the formation of the special court, the filing of the complaint, and the proceedings against Musharraf, thereby setting aside the conviction and sentence.

On January 10, 2024, the Supreme Court set aside the Lahore High Court judgment and upheld the special court's verdict. In its detailed order issued in March 2024, the Supreme Court held that the Lahore High Court had acted without jurisdiction and in violation of prior orders of the Supreme Court.

== See also ==
- Eighteenth Amendment to the Constitution of Pakistan
- Musharraf high treason case
- PCO Judges case
