= Article 4 of the European Convention on Human Rights =

Prohibits slavery and forced labour

Article 4 of the European Convention on Human Rights prohibits slavery and forced labour. Conscription, national service, prison labour, service exacted in cases of emergency or calamity, and "normal civic obligations" are excepted from these definitions.

Article 4 – Prohibition of slavery and forced labour

1. No one shall be held in slavery or servitude.
2. No one shall be required to perform forced or compulsory labour.
3. For the purpose of this article the term "forced or compulsory labour" shall not include:
  1. any work required to be done in the ordinary course of detention imposed according to the provisions of Article 5 of this Convention or during conditional release from such detention;
  2. any service of a military character or, in case of conscientious objectors in countries where they are recognised, service exacted instead of compulsory military service;
  3. any service exacted in case of an emergency or calamity threatening the life or well-being of the community;
  4. any work or service which forms part of normal civic obligations.

== Background ==
Article 4 is an absolute right, which means it cannot be restricted. There is an absolute prohibition on slavery and servitude, under section (1), with no scope for derogation. Article 15(2) clarifies that there is no derogation from Article 4(1), even "in time of war or other public emergency threatening the life of the nation".

However, there is a more limited prohibition on forced labour, with exceptions clearly defined with section (3) of the Article.

Article 4 also imposes a positive obligation on states to actively ensure that there is no violation of the prohibition on slavery and forced labour. This is opposed to a negative obligation where states must simply refrain violating fundamental human rights. The European Court of Human Rights confirmed in Siliadin v France that article 4 imposes a positive obligation on states to adopt criminal law provisions in relation to the prohibition. Therefore, states are required to criminalise slavery, servitude and forced labour.

== Slavery and servitude (art.4(1)) ==
There is no definition of slavery or servitude within the Convention.

=== Slavery ===
The Court has adopted the definition of slavery from Article 1 of the 1926 Slavery Convention, which states that "slavery is the status or condition of a person over whom any or all of the powers attaching to the right of ownership are exercised". This was clarified by the Court in Siliadin v France.

The case of Dolgov v Ukraine confirmed that the condition of slavery is not satisfied simply by work without payment.

=== Servitude ===
The Commission of Human Rights stated in Van Droogenbroeck v Belgium that servitude involves an obligation that is placed on an individual to provide work as well as a violation of freedom. The violation of freedom must involve the individual being forced to live on another's property. Siliadin v France also confirmed that there must be an element of coercion.

The Court explained the distinction between slavery and servitude in Siliadin. They stated that a particular serious form of denial of freedom was needed to constitute servitude which could amount to the complete restriction of freedom of movement on the victim.

== Forced or compulsory labour (art.4(2)) ==
There is no definition of forced or compulsory labour in the Convention.

The concept of forced labour was set out in Van der Mussele v Belgium, where the Court adopted the definition from the International Labour Organisation Convention of 1930: "all work or service which is exacted from any person under the menace of any penalty and for which he has not offered himself voluntarily". The Court confirmed that there must be physical or mental constraint as well as involuntariness, injustice, oppression or avoidable hardship in order to constitute forced labour.

There is no explicit test for forced labour, but the Court stated in Mussele that a range of circumstances will be considered, and the facts of the case will determine whether a particular service falls within the prohibition of forced or compulsory labour.

Iverson v Norway held that the obligation on the individual to work must be excessive and disproportionate in order for the service to constitute forced labour.

== Exclusions (art.4(3)) ==
Section 3 of Article 4 ECHR provides four circumstances in which forced or compulsory labour, under section 2, do not apply. The exclusions apply to those in detention (prisoners), compulsory military service, the emergency services, and any work which constitutes "normal civic obligations".

CN and V v France interpreted the exclusions under Article 4(3) to also suggest guidance on "what shall not constitute forced labour" under Article 4(2).

These exclusions are justified by the idea of the general public interest. The Court stated in Schmidt v Germany that the exclusions are based on "what is normal in the ordinary course of affairs".

=== Work done in the ordinary course of detention ===
Prisoners, or those on conditional release, often undertake unpaid work during the course of their detention. Compulsory work in a forced labour institution would not violate Article 4(2) if carried out by prisoners as part of their rehabilitation.

The Court emphasised in De Wilde, Ooms and Versyp v Belgium the relevance of the compulsory work forming part of rehabilitation as well as being compatible with the general norms of work in detention within the relevant member state.

=== Military service ===
Both voluntary and compulsory military service would not constitute a violation of Article 4(2). This is applicable to conscription and national service.

There is no right to conscientiously object to military service under Article 4. This was clarified in Grandrath v Germany. This case held that it is up to each member state whether they wish to grant the right of conscientious objection and that substitute civilian service can be imposed on objectors instead, which they have no right to object to.

=== Emergency service ===
Compulsory demands placed upon individuals in the case of emergency or calamity threatening the life or well-being of the community will not constitute a violation of Article 4(2), so long as they are proportionate.

In Iverson v Norway, the Court stated that a law requiring dentists to provide public dental services was not in violation of Article 4 due to the public nature of the case. As the work was of short duration and was well paid, the Court stated that the prohibition on forced labour could not reasonably be interpreted to apply.

=== Normal civic obligations ===
Any compulsory work which constitutes a "civic obligation" will not amount to a violation of Article 4(2). A civic obligation has been interpreted by the Court in many different ways and is dependent upon the circumstances and context of each case.

In Adami v Malta, the complainant argued that it was a violation of Article 4(2) to require him to participate in jury service as he had been called upon three times during the period of 1971 to 1997. The Court considered that jury service was a normal civic obligation and therefore did not constitute forced labour or a violation of Article 4.

== Human trafficking ==
The definition of human trafficking can be found in the Council of Europe Trafficking Convention. Human trafficking is not explicitly mentioned within Article 4. However, following the case Rantsev v Cyprus, it was confirmed by the Court that human trafficking fell within the scope of Article 4. Within this case, the Court set out the nature and the scope of the positive obligation placed upon states under Article 4 in relation to human trafficking.

Modern slavery is often associated with trafficking victims from abroad who can be forced into circumstances such as manual labour or sex work. The case S.M. v Croatia established that forced prostitution as a result of human trafficking is covered by Article 4. This case saw the first Grand Chamber judgement concerning human trafficking and found that Croatia had not fulfilled their obligations under Article 4 by failing to fully investigate potential human trafficking. This was the first time that internal human trafficking had been considered as relevant under Article 4 and is therefore significant in expanding its application. S.M. disregarded any ambiguity that was created following Rantsev by clarifying that human trafficking and forced prostitution fell within the scope of Article 4.

Within S.M. v Croatia, the Grand Chamber reiterated the three positive obligations that article 4 places upon states that were set out in Rantsev, "(1) the duty to put in place a legislative and administrative framework to prohibit and punish trafficking; (2) the duty, in certain circumstances, to take operational measures to protect victims, or potential victims, of trafficking; and (3) a procedural obligation to investigate situations of potential trafficking".

== Violations found by the European Court of Human Rights ==
- Siliadin v France, application No. 73316/01 (adjudicated in 2005; case of servitude and forced or compulsory labour)
- Rantsev v Cyprus and Russia, application No. 25965/04 (adjudicated in 2010; case of human trafficking)
- C. N. and V. v France, application No. 67724/09 (adjudicated in 2012)
- C. N. v the United Kingdom, application No. 4239/08 (adjudicated in 2012)
- Chitos v Greece application No. 51637/12 (adjudicated in 2015)
- L. E. v Greece, application No. 71545/12 (adjudicated in 2016)
- Chowdury and others v Greece, application No. 21884/15 (adjudicated in 2017)
- S. M. v Croatia, application No. 60561/14 (adjudicated in 2018)
- T. I. and others v Greece, application No. 40311/10 (adjudicated in 2019)

== Literature ==
- Harris, David; O'Boyle, Michael; Warbrick, Colin (2014). Law of the European Convention on Human Rights (3rd ed.). Oxford; New York: Oxford University Press. pp. 279–286. ISBN 978-0-19-960639-9.

== History ==
- R v Knowles, ex parte Somersett (1772)
- Slavery at common law
- Thirteenth Amendment to the United States Constitution

== See also ==
- European Convention on Human Rights
