= 2001 NATO Article 5 contingency =

Declaration by NATO following the 9/11 attacks

The North Atlantic Treaty Organization (NATO) declared an Article 5 contingency through a series of resolutions of the North Atlantic Council enacted between September 12 and October 2, 2001, done in response to the September 11 attacks in the United States. The decision to invoke NATO's collective self-defense provisions was undertaken at NATO's own initiative, without a request by the United States, and occurred despite the hesitation of Germany, Belgium, Norway, and the Netherlands. It is the only time in NATO's history its collective defense provisions have been invoked.

Two small military operations were ultimately authorized under the terms of the resolutions: Operation Eagle Assist, consisting of the deployment of several aircraft to North America; and, Operation Active Endeavour, a mostly symbolic naval deployment in the Mediterranean Sea. The United States, which was skeptical of NATO capabilities, elected not to seek further Article 5 support and the alliance did not participate in the ensuing American invasion of Afghanistan, though some individual members did make contributions outside of the NATO command structure.

In response to a request by the United Nations, NATO later raised and deployed the International Security Assistance Force (ISAF) with the objective of stabilizing Afghanistan following the United States invasion of that country. ISAF itself was composed mostly of U.S. forces and was headed by U.S. commanders.

== Background ==
On the morning of September 11, 2001, several civilian and military targets in the United States were damaged and destroyed by Al-Qaeda forces. At the time of the September 11 attacks, it was believed by some that the co-occurring 2001 anthrax attacks were also linked to Al-Qaeda.

The United States is a member of the North Atlantic Treaty Organization (NATO). Under the terms of Article 5 of NATO's Washington Treaty, attacks on the territory of signatory states north of the Tropic of Cancer authorize other member states to respond with self-defense actions "including the use of armed force".

== Timeline ==
=== September 12 resolution ===
On the evening of September 11, 2001, NATO's Secretary General, George Robertson, contacted United States Secretary of State Colin Powell with the suggestion that declaring an Article 5 contingency would be a useful political statement for the alliance to make in response to the attacks earlier that day. Powell indicated the United States had no interest in making such a request to the alliance, but would look favorably on such a declaration were NATO to independently initiate it.

NATO professional staff were divided as to whether the September 11 attack constituted a violation of Article 5, and during deliberations on September 12, objections were also raised by the diplomatic delegations of several member states. Germany suggested it was too soon to discuss the possibility of military action. The Netherlands and Belgium sought to water down the language of the draft resolution being circulated, ultimately delaying its adoption by several hours. Norway attempted to distance itself from the measure altogether.

The final resolution, unanimously adopted by the North Atlantic Council on September 12, was a compromise that only contingently invoked Article 5, dependent on a later determination that the attacks had originated from abroad. According to the final text of the declaration, "if it is determined that this attack was directed from abroad against the United States, it shall be regarded as an action covered by Article 5 of the Washington Treaty".

=== Discussions on alliance action ===
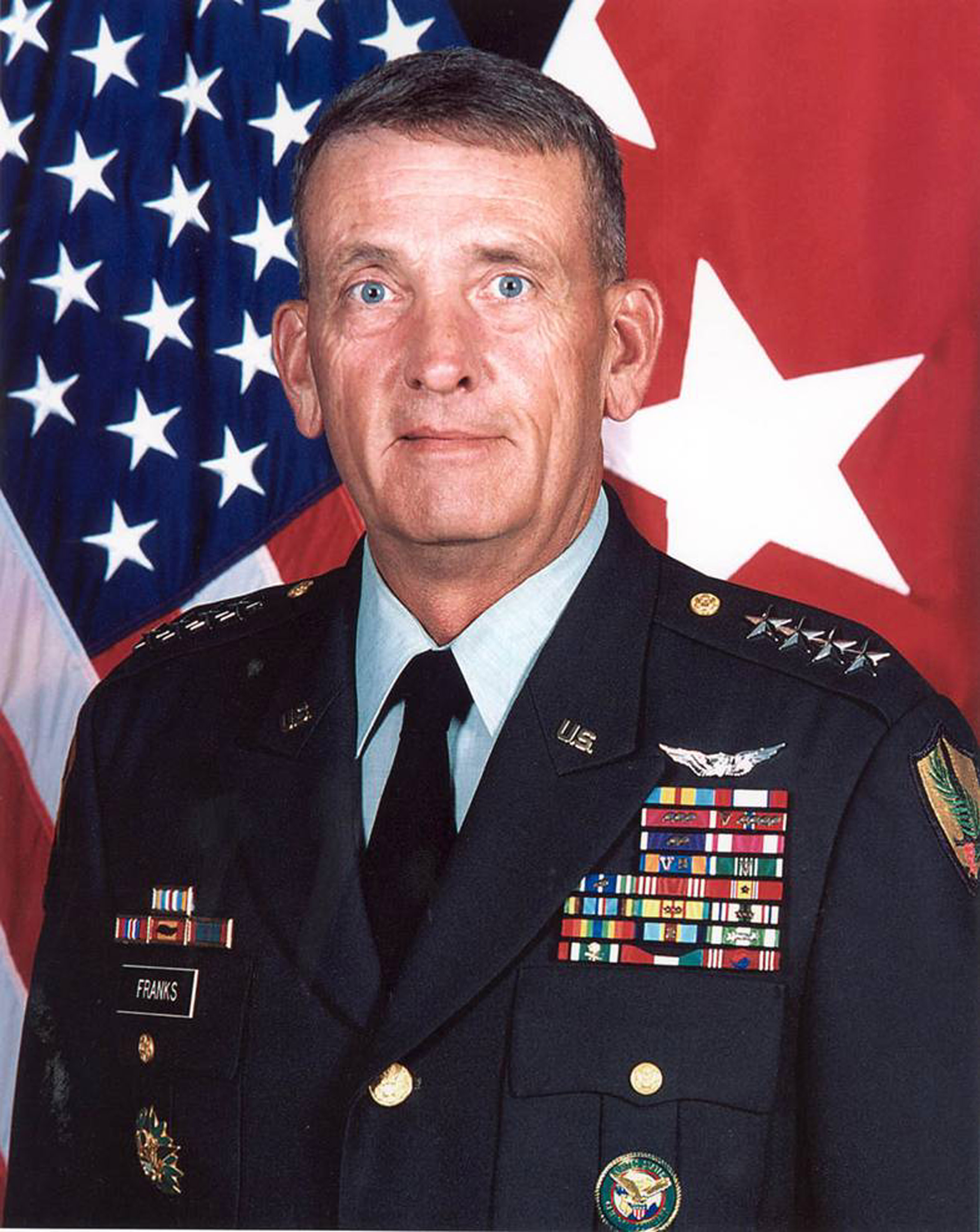
United States Gen. Tommy Franks (pictured) was reportedly ambivalent about NATO support, allegedly stating "I don't have the time to become an expert on the Danish Air Force".

No action resulted from NATO's September 12 resolution.

According to former NATO staff member Michael Rühl, "Washington appeared to embarrass its allies with a terse 'don't call us, we'll call you'" attitude. In one interagency meeting in which the option of tapping NATO forces for the planned U.S. military campaign was mentioned, U.S. Gen. Tommy Franks reportedly dismissed the idea by saying "I don't have the time to become an expert on the Danish Air Force". In a September 20, 2001 appearance before the North Atlantic Council, United States Deputy Secretary of State Richard Armitage bluntly stated that his presence was to convey information only and he "didn't come here to ask for anything".

=== October 2 resolution ===
Several weeks later, on October 2, 2001, the North Atlantic Council issued a further resolution affirming that the September 11 attack originated from outside the United States. The United States privately dismissed the resolution, with one senior official reportedly commenting "I think it's safe to say that we won't be asking SACEUR to put together a battle plan for Afghanistan".

The next day, on October 3, NATO authorized two military operations:

- The first operation — Eagle Assist — deployed 830 aviators and seven NATO-flagged aircraft to the United States. The NATO aircraft supported the United States and Canada's existing Operation Noble Eagle in North America so as to allow United States Air Force aircraft to begin overseas rebasing in preparation for offensive military operations. The NATO aircraft were crewed by personnel from 12 member states, including the U.S. itself. Eagle Assist continued until May of the following year. During the operation, an aerial refueling door to one of the NATO aircraft was slightly damaged.
- The second operation — Active Endeavour — was a naval operation in the Mediterranean intended to arrest the transit of potential weapons of mass destruction (WMD), but has been characterized as more of a symbolic gesture as there was no credible information of a threat to move WMDs through the Mediterranean in the first place. In 2004, Active Endeavour also supported Greek security operations during the Olympics.

Six additional measures were also authorized, including permitting blanket overflight clearances of United States Air Force aircraft over the territory of NATO member states, and increasing local security around U.S. military bases located in NATO member states.

== Aftermath ==
According to the RAND Corporation, NATO hoped that by invoking Article 5 the United States would invite NATO states to participate in its planned military response against Al Qaeda, though no such invitation ultimately materialized and "NATO did not contribute any of its collective assets to Operation Enduring Freedom in Afghanistan". (Note: The United States accepted contributions on a bilateral, non-NATO basis from 14 of NATO's then 19 member states as well as non-NATO members Russia, Latvia, Estonia, and Slovakia. These ranged in size from Estonia's contribution of a five-man explosives detection team, to the UK's commitment of an infantry brigade and naval task force.) American reticence to involve NATO states was due to its perception that NATO's previous intervention in the Kosovo War was an inefficient example of "war by committee". For their part, European states felt U.S. standoffishness in accepting multilateral support was emblematic of American "arrogance".

In response to a request by the United Nations, NATO later raised and deployed the International Security Assistance Force (ISAF) with the objective of stabilizing Afghanistan following the United States invasion of that country. ISAF operated under a NATO flag but was composed primarily of U.S. forces and was at all times under operational command of American officers. It continued operations in Afghanistan until 2014, withdrawing seven years prior to the United States' 2021 retreat and the ensuing Taliban victory.

The 2001 Article 5 contingency is the only time in NATO's history its collective defense provisions have been invoked.
