= Commission on renewal and ethics in public life (France) =

French government commission on renewal and ethics in public life

The French Commission on renewal and ethics in public life (in French Commission sur la rénovation et la déontologie de la vie publique), nicknamed Jospin commission, was a think tank established in 2012 by President François Hollande to provide reforms in public life. (Note: Public life is translated from the French la vie public and refers to holding elected and appointed positions in national and/or local government)

This commission, which is responsible for considering institutional and public life, made its report in November 2012 and proposed reductions in holding multiple elected offices (Note: Holding multiple elected offices (cumul des mandats in French) is common in France. For example, Senators often also serve as the Mayor of a city or town.) and in conflicts of interest; as well as the methods of election of the President of the Republic and legislators.

With the exception of a few measures on declaration of conflicts of interest or the restriction of multiple directorships, most proposals have not been implemented.

== Previous commissions ==
This Committee was preceded by other committees exploring the same subject, including:

- The Committee on discussion and proposals for the modernization and consolidation of institutions, also called Balladur Commission, appointed in 2007 by Nicolas Sarkozy.
- The Vedel Commission, named in 1992 by François Mitterrand.

== Work of the commission ==
The announcement of the establishment of the commission was made during an interview the President of the Republic on 14 July 2012.

The commission was set up by the Decree of 16 July 2012.

The first meeting was on Wednesday July 25; where the commission decided to take time for reflection until August.

François Hollande received the report of the Committee on 9 November 2012.

=== Purpose ===
The purpose of the commission, as its name suggests, was to make proposals to renovate the political field of French public life.

The commission particularly needed to consider the following items:

- Define the conditions for improving the conduct of the presidential election (adequacy of the current system of sponsorship of candidates, terms of campaign financing, rules for communication by candidates in the media);
- Adjust the timing of legislative elections the come after the presidential election;
- Modify the responsibility of the President of the Republic and High Court;
- Change the electoral process for legislative and senatorial elections;
- Increase the limitations on holding multiple public offices for legislative and deputies;
- Prevent conflicts of interest and implement ethics rules to ensure transparency in public life.

=== Membership ===
The committee was composed of seven men and seven women, including its president.

The committee was chaired by former Prime Minister Lionel Jospin.

The following were appointed members of the commission (in alphabetical order):

- Chantal Arens, president of the Tribunal de grande instance de Paris;
- Roselyne Bachelot, former minister;
- Julie Benetti, professor at University of Reims;
- Jean-Claude Casanova, a member of the Institut de France, president of the Fondation Nationale des Sciences Politiques;
- Jean-Pierre Duport, honorary regional prefect;
- Jean-Louis Gallet, at the Court of Cassation, vice president of Disputes Tribunal;
- Marie-Christine Lepetit, head of the General Inspectorate of Finance;
- Wanda Mastor, professor at the University of Toulouse I;
- Ferdinand Mélin-Soucramanien, professor at the University of Bordeaux IV;
- Agnès Roblot-Troizier, professor at the Évry University, also University of Paris I;
- Dominique Rousseau, professor at the University of Paris 1;
- Hélène Ruiz-Fabri, professor at the University of Paris 1;
- Olivier Schrameck, president of the Department of reports and studies at Council of State.

The secretary is Alain Ménéménis, State Councillor.

Two members of the Commission, namely Olivier Schrameck and Jean-Claude Casanova, were members of the Committee for discussion and proposals on the modernization and consolidation of institutions ("Commission Balladur") in 2007.

=== Compensation ===
A rumor, spread in particular by e-mail, complained of exorbitant compensation for four months of work by members of the committee and each of their consultants, at a cost of several million francs. On the radio, Lionel Jospin, several journalists and former members of previous commissions have in turn denied the allegations.

However, in late September, commission member Roselyne Bachelot, feeling particularly targeted by rumors, decided to publicly complain.

=== Critical Analysis ===
According to Claude Allègre and Denis Jeambar, who co-wrote an editorial in Le Monde in September 2012, this commission is in line with the commitment of each of the former presidents of the 5th Republic to revise the constitution according to their taste, past presidents setting up expert committees which met behind closed doors.

The character of the men and women is not being questioned. However, the method used makes for almost inevitable failure. These committees work in confidentiality. So, when their findings are revealed, critical thinking prevails, the controversy settled, oppositions are firing on all cylinders and the President, to calm the political game, buries everything. We will see if it is different with François Hollande, but a change in method could give him greater freedom of action and decision (translated). (Note: Original French: La qualité des hommes et des femmes n'est pas en cause. En revanche, la méthode rend l'échec presque inévitable. Ces commissions travaillent dans la confidentialité. Du coup, lorsque sont dévoilées leurs conclusions, l'esprit critique l'emporte, les polémiques s'installent, les oppositions font feu de tout bois et le président, pour calmer le jeu politique, enterre tout. On verra s'il en va autrement avec François Hollande, mais un changement de méthode pourrait lui donner une plus grande liberté d'action et de décision.)

== Report ==
The committee made 35 proposals in its report:

On the French presidential election:

- Establish the sponsorship of candidates by citizens;
- Change the method of calculating pay for public office;
- Replace the rule of equality of speaking time with a rule of equity for the time between when the official lists are published and when the campaign starts;
- Open polling places for 20 hours in metropolitan areas;
- Change the legislative and presidential elections to later in the year;
- Reduce the time between presidential election and the legislative elections.

On the French legislature:

- Introduce a proportional share method for the election of legislators.;
- Rewrite the procedures for the election of officials representing the French expatriates;
- Eliminate second rounds when a single person is left under majority voting;
- Ensure a fairer representation of local authorities in the Senate by weighting the votes of electors and disallowing votes by the members of the electoral college;
- Extend the use of proportional representation in the election of senators;
- Lower the minimum age of eligibility for the Senate to 18 years;
- Expand the benefits of proportional voting with respect to parity by increasing financial aid to political parties.

On holding multiple offices:

- Prevent ministers from holding local office;
- Make Legislator ineligible for any elective office other than a local office.

On jurisdictional status of the head of state and ministers:

- Better affirm the political nature of the impeachment of the President of the Republic;
- Repeal the protection of the President of the Republic from criminal prosecution;
- Repeal the protection from prosecution of the President of the Republic in civil matters.;
- Eliminate the Cour de Justice de la République (Justice Court of the Republic).

On prevention of conflicts of interest:

- Increase the types and number of government offices that can not be held at the same time;
- Legally require office holders to sign a declaration of interests and activities;
- Legally require office holders to place liquid assets in a managed trust.
- For ministers, add limits on moving to the private sector and to certain public bodies and criminalize illegal interest at the end of government service.;
- Expand to the Cabinet of the President and to cabinet ministers rules regulating holding multiple public offices;
- Legally require employees of the President of the Republic and members of ministerial cabinets to sign a declaration of interests and activities;
- Legally require holders of senior positions in the State that are particularly at risk of conflict of interest to sign a declaration of interest and activities;
- Improve the effectiveness of existing controls within the Public Ethics Commission:
  - change the terms of office;
  - extend the scope of control for those leaving these public offices to all public bodies engaged in economic activity;
- Coordinate and strengthen the system of declaration of interests and activities applicable to members and officials of Autorité administrative indépendante en France|independent administrative authorities;
- Regulate ex-government officers who take a job in the public sector using regulations currently administered by the Commission of Ethics for Public Colleges and responsible members of independent administrative authorities;
- Legally require legislators to declare interests and activities for legislators;
- Make professional legislators ineligible for more government jobs;
- No longer allow members of the Constitutional Council of France to be permanent and prohibit providing any business advice to its members;
- Create an Autorité de déontologie de la vie publique (Authority on Ethics in Public Life);
- Have the Autorité de déontologie de la vie publique validate rules of conduct applicable to lobbyists;
- Establish an open procedure for "whistle-blowing".

== Implementation ==
On 20 February 2013, two bills are presented to the Council of Minister relating to the election of senators. Their purpose was to extend the proportional voting to departments with three or more senators, as well as increase the number of delegates from large cities and change the representation of French outside France (expatriate). These laws were enacted in July and August 2013.

On 13 March 2013, four constitutional bills are presented to the Council of Ministers:

- Elimination of the Cour de Justice de la République;
- Change in the composition of the Conseil supérieur de la magistrature (Higher Judicial Council), the appointment of prosecutors must comply with the opinion of Council;
- Elimination of holding multiple offices between the Government and local executive office. The Presidents of the Republic can no longer be members of the Constitutional Council of France after their term of office;
- The representative trade unions will have to negotiate before the discussion of legislation relating to labor law, employment or training.

The reform of the penal code pertaining to the head of state was no longer considered. For these four texts, the government wanted a meeting of the Congress in July, but because of lack of time and sufficient majority, only the project on Higher Judicial Council was discussed in Parliament, but the Senate stripped the bill of its content. After this, the Government was forced to postpone the revisions.

The text on the Supreme Judicial Council was implemented in the bill on the powers of the Minister of Justice and Public Prosecutors in criminal policy and public action, presented by the Council of Ministers on 27 March and issued July 25.

On 3 April 2013, two texts are presented to the Cabinet:

- Prohibition of holding local executive office at the same time as holding the office of Deputy or Senator.
- Prohibition of holding local executive office at the same time as holding the office of Representative to the European Parliament.

These texts were in force in 2017 instead of 2014 at the request of certain socialist.

Following the Cahuzac affair, further reforms were prepared:

- A draft organizing law on Prosecutor of the Republic for Finance, presented in the Council of Ministers on May 7; and legislation on the fight against tax evasion and great economic and financial crime, presented by the Cabinet on April 24; these texts were promulgated in December 2013.
- Draft organizing law on transparency in public life and legislation on transparency in public life, presented by the Council of Ministers on 24 April and promulgated 11 October. There shall be a High Authority for transparency in public life, responsible for receiving, verifying and publishing the statements of assets, liabilities and declarations of interest of some elected officials, elected officials or employees of a public body which takes proposals from the Commission.

== Bibliography ==
- Commission sur la rénovation et la déontologie de la vie publique (November 2012). Pour un renouveau démocratique [For Democratic Renewal] (PDF) (in French). La Documentation française. p. 130. RapportCommission.
