= Article Two of the Constitution of Georgia (U.S. state) =

Article Two of the Georgia State Constitution describes the process for voting and elections in Georgia. This process includes the method of voting and the right to register and vote, general provisions and the suspension and removal of public officials.

Section I of Article Two of the Georgia State Constitution is made up of three paragraphs which detail the method of voting and the right to register and vote. The first paragraph of this section stipulates that all elections by the people will be through secret ballot and will follow legal procedures. Furthermore, in Paragraph II the age and residency of Georgians who are allowed to vote is described as well as the responsibility of the Georgia General Assembly to provide for the "registration of electors". The final paragraph deals with exceptions to the right to register and vote and states that no one who has been convicted of a felony, or anyone who has been determined, by the judiciary, to be "mentally incompetent", may register to vote.

Five paragraphs make up Section II of Article Two and deal with various general provisions. These provisions include procedures provided by law by the General Assembly for the appeal of the right to vote (both to allow and refuse that right) and where returns on elections made by Georgians will be made to the Secretary of State; run-off elections, and who can vote in a run-off election; persons not eligible to hold office; recall of elected public officials; and vacancies created by an elected official who qualifies for another office (resign-to-run law).

The final section of Article Two, Section III, deals with the suspension and removal of public officials and is made up of two paragraphs. The first paragraph details the procedures for suspending and removing an elected official who has been indicted for a felony. Paragraph II discusses suspension from office for any public official who has been convicted of a felony.

In a 1988 case, Hammill v. Valentine, was brought before the Glynn County Superior Court. In the case, the appellants alleged that voter rights had been violated and that illegal votes cast doubt on the election. The Superior Court found that the appellants lacked standing to "complain about alleged violations of certain voters' constitutional rights".
