= Article element =

Special HTML tag

The HTML article element is a semantic element, similar to <section> and <header>. Introduced in HTML5, it is most commonly used to contain information that may be distributed independently from the rest of the site or application it appears in.

== Features and usage ==
The <article> element represents a complete composition in a web page or web application that is independently distributable or reusable, e.g. in syndication. This could be a forum post, a magazine or newspaper article, a blog entry, a user-submitted comment, an interactive widget or gadget, or any other independent item of content.

=== Examples ===
At its most basic, <article> can be used to encapsulate a body of text and a corresponding title like so:

<article>
  <h2>Insert Title Here</h2>
  <p>Insert  a paragraph of text here</p>
</article>

Forum entries and comments are typically implemented by nesting <article> tags:

<article>
  <header>
    <h1>Entry Title</h1>
    <p>Header Info</p>
  </header>
  <p>Content of entry...</p>
  <article>
    <header>
      <h2>Author: John Smith</h2>
      <p>Comment Info</p>
    </header>
    <p>Comment text...</p>
  </article>
  <article>
    <header>
      <h2>Author: Jane Johnson</h2>
      <p>2nd Comment's Info</p>
    </header>
    <p>Comment text...</p>
  </article>
</article>

=== Attributes ===
The <article> element only includes the global HTML attributes such as contenteditable, id, and title. However, pubdate, an optional boolean attribute of the <time> element, is often used in conjunction with <article>. If present, it indicates that the <time> element is the date the <article> was published. Note that pubdate applies only to the parent <article> element, or to the document as a whole.

== Comparison with <section> ==
HTML5 introduced both <article> and <section>; both are semantic tags, defining sections in a document, such as chapters, headers, footers. The <article> element is effectively a specialized kind of <section> and it has a more specific meaning, referring to an independent, self-contained block of related content.

=== Nesting examples ===
To better organize independent content <section> tags can be nested inside <article> tags:

<article>
  <h2>Names of Shapes</h2>
  <p>There are several different types of shapes...</p>
  <section>
    <h4>Triangles</h4>
    <p>Here is some info about triangles</p>
  </section>
  <section>
    <h4>Circles</h4>
    <p>These Pi-shaped wonders are mesmerizing and...</p>
  </section>
</article>

Conversely, it may sometimes be appropriate to nest an <article> element inside a <section> element. For example, in a web page containing several articles on varying subjects:

<section>
  <h1>Articles about Paris Tourism</h1>
  <article>
    <h3>The Eiffel Tower</h3>
    <p>Standing at over 12 inches high...</p> 
  </article>
  <article>
    <h3>The Louvre</h3>
    <p>A must-see in Paris tourism...</p>
  </article>
</section>

== Browser support ==
The following browsers have support for this element:

- Desktop
  - Google Chrome 5.0 and higher
  - Firefox 4.0 and higher
  - Internet Explorer 9.0 and higher
  - Safari 4.1 and higher
  - Opera 11.1 and higher
- Mobile
  - Android 2.2 and higher
  - Firefox Mobile (Gecko) 4.0 and higher
  - IE Mobile 9.0 and higher
  - Safari Mobile 5.0 and higher
  - Opera Mobile 11.0 and higher
