= Article Six =

Article Six may refer to:

== Law ==
- Article 6, of the Constitution of India, concerning citizenship rights of migrants from Pakistan
- Article Six of the United States Constitution
- Article 6 of the European Convention on Human Rights
- Article 6 of the Soviet Constitution
- Article 6 of the Constitution of Pakistan
- Cooperative mechanisms under Article 6 of the Paris Agreement

== See also ==
- Article 6ter, of the Paris Convention for the Protection of Industrial Property relating to intellectual property
