= Nairobi Metropolitan Command =

The Nairobi Metropolitan Command is a Kenya Army military formation tasked with acting as a military police type unit for the capital of Nairobi. It was created in 2013 to deal with urban crimes such as domestic terrorism and drug trafficking in Nairobi County and the surrounding area. Criticisms of the unit included the fact that President Uhuru Kenyatta should have ensured no possible conflict with the civilian National Police Service (NPS) and the new unit. There were also expressed concerns of a similar operation like the Black Mamba squad in the Uganda People's Defense Force.
