= Marie François =

Marie François may refer to:

- Auguste Marie François Beernaert (1829–1912), Prime Minister of Belgium
- Marie François Oscar Bardy de Fourtou (1836–1897), French politician
- Marie François Sadi Carnot (1837–1894), French statesman
- Marie François Xavier Bichat (1771–1802), French anatomist and physiologist
- Marie François (handballer) (born 1993), French handballer
- Marie-François Auguste de Caffarelli du Falga (1766–1849), French general

== See also ==
- François Marie (disambiguation)
