= Articles of Religion =

Articles of Religion may refer to:

- Thirty-nine Articles, of the Church of England
- Twenty-five Articles, of Methodism
