= Constitutional amendments under the French Fifth Republic =

The French constitution of 4 October 1958 was revised many times in its early years. Changes to this fundamental law have become more frequent since the 1990s, for two major reasons:

1. public projects for institutional modernization
2. adaptation to European Union and other international law.

== Overview ==
=== Amendment procedures ===
==== Article 89 ====
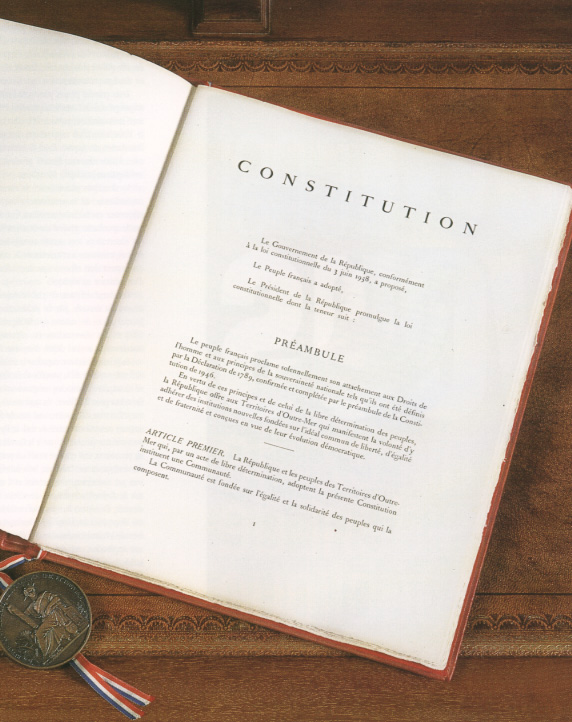
The French constitution of 4 October 1958 provides for revisions.

The revision of the Constitution under Article 89 of the Constitution:

Constitutional revisions are initiated by the President of France on a proposal by the French Prime Minister and members of the French Parliament.

The project or the proposed revision should be ... passed by both houses with identical terms. The review is final after being approved by referendum.

However, the proposed revision is not submitted to referendum if the President of the Republic decides to submit it to Parliament convened in Congress; in this case, the proposed revision is approved only if it receives three-fifths majority of the votes cast.

...

No revision procedure may be commenced or continued which jeopardizes the integrity of the territory.

The republican form of government can not be revised.

In its current form, article 89 and 42 state that "the plenary discussion of the draft constitutional amendment ... carries, on first reading to the first meeting, on the text submitted by the Government, and for further reading on the text sent by the other parliamentary branch" (and not on the text adopted by the committee as ordinary laws). Furthermore, "the discussion in meeting, first reading of a draft or a bill can only occur before the first assembly, until the expiration of a period of six weeks after filing. It can only occur before the second meeting at the expiration of a period of four weeks from the date of transmission."

The Constitutional Council declared itself incompetent to rule on a constitutional revision.

==== Other ways to amend ====
Since the beginning of the French Fifth Republic, revisions have been adopted without using section 89.

- The Constitutional Act of 4 June, 1960 was adopted by a parliamentary vote according to the original article 85 of the Constitution, which involved the Senate of the Community.
- The Constitutional Act of 6 November, 1962 was adopted, without any parliamentary procedure, through direct referendum by Article 11 de la Constitution de la Cinquième République française. Using this procedure to revise the Constitution this way has been strongly criticized, since the text of Article 11 does not explicitly provide that it can be used to revise the Constitution.

=== When amendments are effective ===
Unless otherwise stated, the provisions of constitutional laws come into force on the date of enactment.

However, some recent constitutional laws have provided a delayed effective date. The material content of the Constitution, in these cases, changes on different dates from those of other enactments of constitutional laws.

For example, the constitution act of 23 July 2008 provides in article 46 that some sections of the reform are effective on 1 March 2009 and others "under the conditions established by law and necessary for their implementing organic laws" (translated). (Note: Original: dans les conditions fixées par les lois et lois organiques nécessaires à leur application.) Thus the old wording of certain articles remained in force for more than eighteen months after the constitutional amendment, while implementing laws were not all ready. This is notably the case of the establishment of referendums initiated by the parliament and supported by a part of the electorate, which is foreseen in the new version of Article 11.

The same constitutional amendment provides in Article 47 that certain amendments of the articles of the Constitution relating to the European Union come into force at the time Lisbon Treaty becomes effective. This occurred on 1 December 2009 and the new content of these articles came into force on that date.

The Constitutional Law of 1 March 2005 had planned similar provisions concerning entry into force of the Treaty establishing a Constitution for Europe, which have become obsolete due to the termination of the process of ratification of this Treaty.

== Adopted amendments ==
=== All amendments ===
The French Constitution of the Fifth Republic has been revised twenty-five different times since 1958:

Date		Articles (Note: Number of affected article or section of article within Constitution; inserted / changed / ~~deleted~~)	Reason for Revision	Procedure
Enacted	In effect	Articles	Reason for Revision	Procedure
4 June 1960 (Note: Loi constitutionnelle n° 60-525 du 4 juin 1960 tendant à compléter les dispositions du titre XII de la Constitution)		85, 86	Independence of African Member States of the French Community	old article 85
6 November 1962 (Note: Loi n° 62-1292 du 6 novembre 1962 relative à l'élection du Président de la République au suffrage universel)		6	Direct election of President by universal suffrage	article 11
30 December 1963 (Note: Loi constitutionnelle n° 63-1327 du 30 décembre 1963 portant modification des dispositions de l'article 28 de la Constitution)		28	Change the date of parliamentary sessions	Article 89 (congress)
29 October 1974 (Note: Loi constitutionnelle n° 74-904 du 29 octobre 1974 portant révision de l'article 61 de la Constitution)		61	Extension of the right of referral to the Constitutional Council	Article 89 (congress)
18 June 1976 (Note: Loi constitutionnelle n° 76-527 du 18 juin 1976 modifiant l'article 7 de la Constitution)		7	Changes the presidential election campaign rules	Article 89 (congress)
25 June 1992 (Note: Loi constitutionnelle n° 92-554 du 25 juin 1992 ajoutant à la Constitution un titre : "Des Communautés européennes et de l'Union européenne")		2, 54, 74, 88-1, 88-2, 88-3, 88-4	Revisions to the ratification of the Maastricht Treaty: Economic and monetary union, European citizens to vote in French municipal elections, common visa policy, French language, organic laws for overseas territories, parliamentary resolutions on community acts (Note: the Maastricht Treaty was ratified in accordance with No. 92-1017 of 24 September 1992 authorizing the ratification of the Maastricht Treaty, itself approved by referendum on September 20, 1992)	Article 89 (congress)
27 July 1993 (Note: Loi constitutionnelle n° 93-952 du 27 juillet 1993 portant révision de la Constitution du 4 octobre 1958 et modifiant ses titres VIII, IX, X et XVIII)		65, 68, 68-1, 68-2, 93	Creation of the Court of Justice of the Republic and reforms to the Superior Council of the Magistrature.	Article 89 (congress)
25 November 1993 (Note: Loi constitutionnelle n°93-1256 du 25 novembre 1993 relative aux accords internationaux en matière de droit d'asile)		53-1	International agreements on Asylum	Article 89 (congress)
4 August 1995 (Note: Loi constitutionnelle no 95-880 du 4 août 1995 portant extension du champ d'application du référendum, instituant une session parlementaire ordinaire unique, modifiant le régime de l'inviolabilité parlementaire et abrogeant les dispositions relatives à la Communauté et les dispositions transitoires)		1, 2, 11, 12, 26, 28, 48, 49, 51, 68-3, 70, ~~76~~, ~~77–87~~, 88, ~~90–92~~	Expanding possibilities of using the referendum, single parliamentary session, development of parliamentary immunity, repeal of provisions relating to the French Community	Article 89 (congress)
22 February 1996 (Note: Loi constitutionnelle no 96-138 du 22 février 1996 instituant les lois de financement de la sécurité sociale)		34, 39, 47-1	Law for financing of social security	Article 89 (Congress)
20 July 1998 (Note: Loi constitutionnelle no 98-610 du 20 juillet 1998 relative à la Nouvelle-Calédonie)		76, 77	New Caledonia	Article 89 (congress)
25 January 1999 (Note: Loi constitutionnelle n° 99-568 du 8 juillet 1999 insérant, au titre VI de la Constitution, un article 53-2 et relative à la Cour pénale internationale)		88-2, 88-4	Revisions to the ratification of the Amsterdam Treaty (Note: The Amsterdam Treaty is ratified according to Law No. 99-229 of 23 March 1999 authorizing the ratification of the Treaty of Amsterdam amending the Treaty on European Union, the Treaties establishing the European Communities and certain related acts.)	Article 89 (congress)
8 July 1999		53-2	Provisions for recognizing the International Criminal Court	Article 89 (congress)
8 July 1999 (Note: Loi constitutionnelle n° 99-569 du 8 juillet 1999 relative à l'égalité entre les femmes et les hommes)		3, 4	Provisions for equality between women and men	Article 89 (congress)
2 October 2000 (Note: Loi constitutionnelle n° 2000-964 du 2 octobre 2000 relative à la durée du mandat du Président de la République)		6	Five-year presidential term	Article 89 (referendum)
25 March 2003 (Note: Loi constitutionnelle n° 2003-267 du 25 mars 2003 relative au mandat d'arrêt européen)		88-2	European Arrest Warrant	Article 89 (congress)
28 March 2003 (Note: Loi constitutionnelle n° 2003-276 du 28 mars 2003 relative à l'organisation décentralisée de la République)		1, 7, 13, 34, 37-1, 39, 60, 72, 72-1, 72-2, 72-3, 72-4, 73, 74, 74-1	Decentralized organization of the Republic: local referendum, restriction on the administration of Communes (art. 72), experimentation by local government and local finance	Article 89 (congress)
1 March 2005 (Note: Loi constitutionnelle n° 2005-204 du 1er mars 2005 modifiant le titre XV de la Constitution)	1 March 2005	60, 88-1, 88-5	Revisions for the ratification of the Treaty establishing a Constitution for Europe (Note: The Treaty establishing a Constitution for Europe has not been ratified by France after the "nays" won the referendum of May 29, 2005. Thus, amendments to bring the constitution into compliance with the Treaty (Article 3 of the Constitution Act) never entered into force.)	Article 89 (congress)
1 March 2005	Never (Note: Was to enter in force with the entry into force of the Treaty establishing a Constitution for Europe (rejected in referendums in both France and the Netherlands))	88-1, 88-2, 88-3, 88-4, 88-5, 88-6, 88-7	Revisions for the ratification of the Treaty establishing a Constitution for Europe	Article 89 (congress)
1 March 2005 (Note: Loi constitutionnelle n° 2005-205 du 1er mars 2005 relative à la Charte de l'environnement)		Preamble, 34	Environmental Charter	Article 89 (congress)
23 February 2007 (Note: Loi constitutionnelle n° 2007-237 du 23 février 2007 modifiant l'article 77 de la Constitution)		77	Electoral College of New Caledonia	Article 89 (congress)
23 February 2007 (Note: Loi constitutionnelle n° 2007-238 du 23 février 2007 portant modification du titre IX de la Constitution)		67, 68	Criminal statute about the head of state	Article 89 (congress)
23 February 2007 (Note: Loi constitutionnelle n° 2007-239 du 23 février 2007 relative à l'interdiction de la peine de mort)		66-1	Constitutionalisation of the abolition of the death penalty	Article 89 (congress)
4 February 2008 (Note: Loi constitutionnelle n° 2008-103 du 4 février 2008 modifiant le titre XV de la Constitution)	4 February 2008	88-1	Revisions for the ratification of the Treaty of Lisbon. (Note: The Treaty of Lisbon was ratified following Act No. 2008-125 of 13 February 2008 authorizing the ratification of the Treaty of Lisbon amending the Treaty on European Union, the Treaty establishing the European Community and certain related acts)	Article 89 (congress)
4 February 2008	1 December 2009 (Note: Entered in force with the entry in force of the Treaty of Lisbon)	88-1, 88-2, 88-4, 88-5, 88-6, 88-7	Revisions for the ratification of the Treaty of Lisbon.	Article 89 (congress)
23 July 2008 (Note: Loi constitutionnelle n° 2008-724 du 23 juillet 2008 de modernisation des institutions de la Ve République)	23 July 2008	1, 3, 4, 6, 16, 18, 24, 34, 35, 38, 47, 47-1, 47-2, 61, 62, 70, 71, 72-3, 74-1, 75-1, 87, 88-4, 88-5, 89	Important revision providing: Term limit of two terms for the President of the Republic, introduction of shared initiative referendum and priority question of constitutionality, information of Parliament by the Government in case of intervention of the armed forces abroad, changes in the operation of the Economic, Social and Environmental Council and the Supreme Judicial Council, creation of Defender of Rights, agenda of assemblies set by the assembly, deliberation in open session of the Parliament on the text adopted by the committee ...	Article 89 (congress)
23 July 2008	From 25 July 2008 (Note: These changes entered in force with the entry into force of their respective organic laws.)	11, 13, 25, 34-1, 39, 44, 56, 61-1, 65, 69, 71-1, 73		Article 89 (congress)
23 July 2008	1 March 2009	41, 42, 43, 45, 46, 48, 49, 50-1, 51-1, 51-2		Article 89 (congress)
23 July 2008	1 December 2009 (Note: Entered in force with the entry in force of the Treaty of Lisbon.)	88-4, 88-5, 88-6		Article 89 (congress)
4 March 2024		34	Guarantees right to an abortion	Article 89 (congress)

=== 1962: Election of the President of the Republic by direct universal suffrage ===
Wanting to override the likely opposition of the Senate, De Gaulle revised the constitution using Article 11, which allows the president to submit to referendum "any bill on the organization of government." (Note: Original: tout projet de loi portant sur l'organisation des pouvoirs publics) The legality of using this method is very questionable, as the Constitution provides mechanisms for its own review in section 89 (a referendum is possible, but only with the agreement of the parliament). It aroused intense political debate and legal controversy, and the formation of a secret group of votes against (cartel des non).

However, the prestige of De Gaulle, the fact that the "yes" won with over 62% of the vote, and the fact that the Constitutional Council refuses to review the constitutionality of laws passed by referendum (as they are adopted by the people), allowed the implementation of this reform. This irregular procedure of constitutional amendment later regarded as newly created constitutional customary law.

In practice, this reform has not only changed the method of electing the President, it has also significantly increased its powers by giving it a popular legitimacy not shared by the Prime Minister. For example, the President could, except in periods of cohabitation, ask the prime minister to resign, which is not provided in the text of the original.

=== 1974: Reform of the method of referral to the Constitutional Council ===
==== Background ====
The Constitutional Council was intended by Michel Debré and Charles de Gaulle to be a gun against the Parliament, as part of a rationalized parliamentary strategy. Thus, the Commission's role was primarily to enforce Article 34 of the Constitution, limiting the encroachments of the parliament and, in contrast, creating a strong and independent executive. However, Constitutional Decision 71-44 DC of 16 July 1971 gave a new place to the Constitutional Council.

==== Review ====
Because of this, the Constitutional Council needed reform. Valéry Giscard d'Estaing, newly elected President of the Republic, wanted to expand the ability to refer legislation to the Constitutional Council to members of parliament (60 deputies or 60 senators), allowing a large enough opposition to refer legislation the Constitutional Council and so ensure compliance with the Constitution.

He also wanted the Constitutional Council to be able to take the initiative to review legislation that they claimed infringed on civil liberties guaranteed by the preamble or the body of the Constitution, so that every law would actually be consistent with the Constitution. Indeed, in the absence of the political will for a parliamentary referral, a law contrary to the Constitution can enter into force. The National Assembly, however, prevented this provision, especially because it could "lead almost inevitably to the Council using it to prejudge the decision they will have to take"(translated). (Note: Original: de conduire presque inéluctablement le Conseil, lorsqu'il en fera usage, à préjuger la décision qu'il sera amené à prendre) if they had already said they would choose to review a law.

==== Consequences ====
The constitutional revision of 1974, though it was called a "small reform" when it was voted on by Congress, has profoundly upset French political action, better ensuring the superiority of the Constitution over the laws. There were 54 constitutional decisions between 1958 and 1975, there were more than 200 in the next 15 years, between 1975 and 1990. However, the problem of referral remained unresolved: it was still possible today to see a law contrary to the Constitution coming into force, with the excesses that it could carry. An independent referral to the parliamentary and executive power seemed essential, as was the case in Germany or Spain. Since March 2010, the Priority Question of Constitutionality opened ability to refer legislation to any person who, in the course of a proceeding, challenges the constitutionality of a statutory provision. This referral allows, after being filtered by the Supreme Court of jurisdiction, (Court of Cassation or Council of State) to ask the Constitutional Council to repeal this provision, if it is contrary to a right or freedom that Constitution guarantees.

=== 1992: Maastricht Treaty ===
This amendment was intended to make the Constitution compatible with the Treaty on European Union .

=== 2000: The Quinquennat ===
A five-year presidential term of office was presented for the first time on 10 September 1973 by Georges Pompidou. The text was passed in identical terms by the National Assembly and the Senate, but was not submitted to Congress for final approval. The President did not continue the action, as he could not muster the required three-fifths majority in Congress and because of resistance to his project.

The bill of 2000 is the first constitutional amendment submitted to referendum pursuant to section 89 of the Constitution. After 73% of "yes" votes on 24 September 2000, it passed on October 2. It limited the term of French presidents to five years, but was not applied to the president, Jacques Chirac, who was elected in 1995 for seven years. The main motivation for this revision was to avoid cohabitation, by matching the term of office of the President with the Deputies. Indeed, when the parliamentary majority did not support the President, he would be forced to appoint a hostile prime minister as a minister of his party and would be likely be reversed by the National Assembly.

=== 2005: Charter for the Environment ===
The Constitution includes in its preamble, since 1 March 2005, the Charter for the Environment of ten articles, initiated by President of the Republic Jacques Chirac and drafted by a Commission led by Yves Coppens.

=== 2008: Ratification of the Treaty of Lisbon ===
For the subsequent ratification of the Treaty of Lisbon, a revision of Title XV of the Constitution was passed by Congress on February 4, 2008, by 560 votes against 181. The Constitutional Law was issued on the same day.

The amendments to the Constitution endorse the transfer of sovereignty listed in the Treaty of Lisbon by direct reference to the text. Thirty areas covered so far by the unanimity rule as the common agricultural policy or criminal justice, now will require a vote of a supermajority.

In terms of institutional functioning, changes reflected in constitutional terms relating to the powers granted to national parliaments.

As of the entry into force of the Lisbon Treaty, Title XV of the Constitution will be amended according to Article 2 of the Constitution Act.

Article 3 of the Constitution Act revokes the provisions of Article 3 of the Constitutional Law No. 2005-204 of 1 March 2005 which amended Title XV of the Constitution "from the entry into force of this Treaty": these constitutional provisions are not in force and are now devoid of purpose.

=== 2008: Institutional reform ===
In continuation of the work of the "Balladur" committee Parliament met in Congress and adopted on 21 July 2008 a constitutional amendment that creates or amends 47 articles of the Constitution: articles 1, 3, 4, 6, 11, 13, 16, 17, 18, 24, 25, 34, 34-1 (new ), 35, 38, 39, 41, 42, 43, 44, 45, 46, 47, 47-1, 47-2 (new), 48, 49, 50-1, 51-1 (new), 51-2 (new), 56, 61, 61-1 (new), 62, 65, 69, 70, 71, 71-1 (new), 72-3, 73, 74-1, 75-1 (new), 87 (new), 88-4, 88-5, 89. The vote was 539 votes in favor acquired with the adoption threshold is 538 votes, or two-thirds of the votes cast.

=== 2024: Right to abortion ===
Passed in a 780 to 72 vote, the measure amended Article 34. This amendment made France, as of passage, the only nation to guarantee the right to an abortion. The amendment describes abortion as a "guaranteed freedom"; while Yugoslavia included similar measures in 1974 guaranteeing the right to "decide on having children", the French amendment is the first to explicitly guarantee abortion.

== Abandoned or unratified amendments ==
In 1969, Charles de Gaulle had a bill on the creation of the regions and on the renovation of the Senate. Adopted by both houses, the referendum of 27 April 1969 rejected (52.4% no, Charles de Gaulle, taking note of the refusal of the French people, immediately resigned). Regionalization was finally put into place via legislation, notably in 1972 and a 2003 constitutional revision which constitutionalized the region.

In 1974, Valéry Giscard d'Estaing, seeking to amend Article 25 of the Constitution to make the rules of the dual office holding between a parliamentary office and functions of government. The project was approved by both chambers but the president did not pursue the matter further.

In 1984, François Mitterrand wanted to expand the scope of the referendum from Article 11 to extend the basic guarantees of civil liberties The bill was passed by the National Assembly but rejected by the Senate.

Referral to the Constitutional Council by citizens in the framework of the institution of constitutional review by exception was first presented by François Mitterrand in 1990 the bill was approved by the National Assembly, as amended by the Senate and eventually withdrawn by the Government. A new bill, introduced in 1993, was abandoned after deliberation by the Senate. Finally, the priority question of constitutionality was introduced to the article 61-1 de la constitution|Article 61-1 of the Constitution by section 29 of the Act Constitution of 23 July 2008.

In 1998, Jacques Chirac undertook to reform the Supreme Judicial Council. Filed on 15 April 1998, the bill was adopted by both houses on 18 November 1998. The bill was not presented to Congress. However, the composition of the said Council would be reformed via the constitutional amendment of July 23, 2008.

Jacques Chirac presented a bill about French Polynesia and New Caledonia. Filed on 26 May 1999, it was adopted by both houses on October 12. The decree of 3 November 1999 intending to submit these two bills in the Parliament in Congress January 24, 2000, but was removed from consideration by the decree of the President of the Republic of 19 January 2000. Later these collectivities will be globally affected by the constitutional revision of 28 March 2003 on the decentralized organization of the Republic. New Caledonia would then be covered by the constitutional amendment of February 23, 2003 for its constituency and French Polynesia, the Organic Act No. 2004-192 of 27 February 2004 concerning the autonomy of French Polynesia.

In 2011, Nicolas Sarkozy wished to include in the Constitution rules providing for a gradual return to a balanced budget, called "Golden Rule", which was passed by both houses on second reading by the Senate July 11, 2011 and third reading in identical terms by the National Assembly July 13, 2011. Due to the inability to raise the necessary three-fifths majority in Congress, President Nicolas Sarkozy abandoned this amendment, hoping to resume if re-elected, which was not the case. Finally, Parliament adopted, in November 2012, a simple organic law which takes the idea of the Golden Rule

On 13 March 2013, under the chairmanship of François Hollande four bills are presented in the Council of Ministers:

- Remove the Law Court of the Republic
- Changing the composition of the Supreme Judicial Council, the appointment of prosecutors must comply with the Commission's
- No dual mandate between the Government and local executive offices. The presidents will become members of Constitutional Council after they leave office.
- The representative unions must negotiate before the discussion of legislation on labor law, employment or vocational training

The Government wanted Congress to meet in July, but due to time and an insufficient majority, only one bill was discussed in Parliament (the one on the High Judicial Council) where the Senate had cleared the bill of its content. Following this, the Government was forced to postpone revisions.

== Study groups on the constitutional amendments ==
Several committees have been formally constituted to formulate proposals to overhaul governmental institutions:

- Vedel Commission, chaired by Professor of Public Law Georges Vedel in 1993. Although there were no immediate results, his work were used for study and reforms that followed, particularly in 1995 and 2008.
- Truche Commission in 1997, led by Pierre Truche, first president of the Court of Cassation, responsible for a study on reform to Supreme judicial council. The constitutional amendment proposed in 1998 as a result of his work did not succeed. The study will be repeated in 2007 and would be presented in part during the constitutional revision of July 2008.
- The Avril Commission, chaired by Professor of Public Law Pierre Avril, in 2002, invited comments on the criminal status of the President of the Republic. This work would inspire in part the constitutional revision of February 23, 2007.
- Committee discussion and proposals on the modernization and consolidation of institutions, or "Balladur commission", was chaired by former Prime Minister Edouard Balladur in 2007. The constitutional amendment resulting from the findings of the committee was adopted by the Congress on July 21, 2008.
- The Veil Commission, chaired by former minister and magistrate Simone Veil In 2008, asked to rule on whether to introduce new rights in the preamble of the Constitution. The commission finally considered a single addition to Article 1} of the Constitution to include a reference to a principle of "equal dignity of everyone"
- Commission on renewal and ethics in public life, called "Jospin commission", chaired by former Prime Minister Lionel Jospin, was charged in 2012 to propose a reform of public life. It makes 35 propositions on the presidential election, Parliament, limiting which public offices can be held at the same time, the jurisdictional status of the executive and the prevention of conflicts of interest.

== Organic Laws Cited ==
For more information on organic law, see the article Organic law.
