= Article 15 =

Article 15 may refer to:

- Article 15 (idiom), a humorous French idiom common in the Democratic Republic of the Congo
- Article 15 of the Constitution of India, prohibiting religious, racial, sexual, casteist and birth place discrimination
  - Article 15 (film), a 2019 Indian thriller film by Anubhav Sinha based on the article
- Article 15 of the Constitution of Singapore, which guarantees freedom of religion
- Non-judicial punishment as authorized by Article 15 of the United States Uniform Code of Military Justice
- Article 15 of the European Convention on Human Rights
