= Article Seven =

Article Seven may refer to:

== Law ==
- Article 7, of the Constitution of India, concerning citizenship rights of Indian migrants to Pakistan
- Article Seven of the United States Constitution
- Article 7 of the European Convention on Human Rights
- Article 7 of the Treaty on European Union, which details the sanctions if the values of the EU are breached by a member state
