= Article Four =

Article Four may refer to:

== Law ==
- Article 4 of the European Convention on Human Rights
- Article 4, of the Constitution of India, providing for amendments relating to states and union territories
- Article Four of the United States Constitution
- Article 4 direction, a local restriction on development rights in the United Kingdom
- Article 4, of the Constitution of Kazakhstan
- Article 4, of the Anglo-Iraqi Treaty of 1930
- Article 4 of the North Atlantic Treaty, the starting point for major NATO operations
- Article IV of the Final Protocol, of the Greco-Turkish Agreement of 1926

== Other uses ==
- Article Four (political party), a former party in Sicily, Italy
