= Sankaralinganar =

Indian freedom fighter

- Born: January 26, 1895; Manmalai Medu near Virudhunagar, Madras Presidency, British India (present-day Tamil Nadu, India)
- Died: October 13, 1956 (aged 61); Madurai
- Organization: Tamilnadu state movement

Sankaralinga Nadar was an Indian Tamil independence activist and Gandhian from Indian union who fasted to death in an effort to change the name of Madras State to Tamil Nadu. He was a Tamil Nadu statehood activist.

== Early life ==
Sankaralinga Nadar was born in Manmalai Medu village near Virudhunagar to Karuppasamy Nadar and Valliammai in 1895. He studied in the same school as Ex CM Kamaraj. He completed his schooling at Enadhinatha Nayanar Vidyalaya in Virudhunagar. He started a Khadi business in Paramakudi. In 1917, he joined Indian National Congress and participated in the Indian independence movement. Upon C. Rajagopalachari's request, he left his business and joined Gandhi Ashram in Tiruchengode. In 1930, Sankaralinganar participated in the Salt March led by Mahatma Gandhi from Ahmedabad to Dandi. For his involvement in the independence movement, he was imprisoned for six months in Trichy (Tiruchirappalli). He accompanied Mahatma Gandhi during his visit to Virudhunagar in 1933. In 1952, Sankaralinganar donated his two houses for a girls school and deposited money to provide food to the students.

== Hunger strike ==
After independence of India in 1947, Madras Presidency became Madras State. Madras State had multilingual speakers which included Tamil, Malayalam, Kannada and Telugu speakers. In 1952, Potti Sreeramulu demanded a separate state for Telugu speaking people with Madras as its capital. He went on hunger strike with his demand, and later died during his fasts. The Government of India formed a separate state and reorganised states in 1956 based on linguistic lines. After reorganisation, Tamil speaking people became the majority in Madras State. Tamil activists demanded a change in the state's name. During this period, Sankaralinganar started a hunger strike on 27 July 1956 in Virudhunagar, with twelve demands which included Madras State to be renamed Tamil Nadu, the achievement of electoral reforms and alcohol prohibition in India. Leaders like C. N. Annadurai, M. P. Sivagnanam and Jeevanandham requested him to stop his hunger strike but he continued. His health deteriorated and he was admitted to a hospital in Madurai. After 76 days of fasting, he died on 13 October 1956.

== Legacy ==
The name officially changed to Tamil Nadu on 14 January 1969 by an amendment in the Parliament of India. The Tamil Nadu Government built a memorial dedicated to Sankaralinganar in Virudhunagar in 2015.
