= François-Marie Algoud =

French journalist (1920–2012)

François Marie Algoud (July 1, 1920 – January 5, 2012) was a French royalist and Roman Catholic author, who was affiliated with Action Française.

== Publications ==
- Guide jeunesse : 1000 mouvements, associations, organismes, centres, foyers, communautés, écoles
- Mille six-cents jeunes saints, jeunes témoins : de leur foi, de leur idéal, de toujours et de maintenant
- with Michel Berger, Culture de vie contre culture de mort ou La foi, l'Église et le bon sens
- with Désiré Dutonnerre, La peste et le choléra : Marx, Hitler et leurs héritiers
- Editor, Berthe Hansenne, Lettre aux catholiques français : il faut reconstruire le temple de Dieu
- France, notre seule patrie : mises au point, preface by Pierre Pujo
- Actualité et présence de Charles Maurras (1868-1952), volume I, Un très grand poète, la musique des vers au service de l'ordre, du beau et du vrai
- Actualité et présence de Charles Maurras (1868-1952), t. II, L'altissime au service de la France et de l'Église, préface by Jean-Marie Keller; contributions from Albert André Algoud, Michel Fromentoux and François Saint-Pierre
