= Part I of the Constitution of India =

Constitutional Law governing India as a union of States

Part I—The Union and Its territories is a compilation of laws pertaining to the constitution of India as a country and the union of states and union territories that it is made of.

This part of the Indian constitution contains the law in establishment, renaming, merging or altering the borders of the states or union territories. It also physically defines the words union / central government / government of India, states, territory of India, territory of a state, union territories and acquired territories which are used frequently in the constitution. This part contains four articles article 1 to 4. These articles were invoked when West Bengal was renamed, and for formation of relatively new states such as Jharkhand, Chhattisgarh, Sikkim and recently Telangana.

== Articles 1 and 2 ==
Article 1 of the constitution says that India, that is Bharat, shall be a union of states and the territory of India consists of that of the states, union territories specified in the First Schedule and other acquired territories.

The acquired territories can be converted in to a state as per Article 2. Jammu and Kashmir were converted into Union territories in 2019. Ladakh was also so converted.

Sikkim was a special case which was included as a completely new type of statehood under a new Article 2A and conditions mentioned in tenth schedule, and was called 'associate state'. But this experiment failed and Sikkim was later added to Indian Union by the Constitutional Amendment Act (1975).

With the seventh amendment to the constitution in 1956. The representation of seats in the council of states (Rajya Sabha) shall be given in Schedule 4 of the constitution. The territorial waters and the exclusive economic zones shall also become part of the territories of states or union territories in the absence of any listing of them separately in Schedule 1 and 4 of the constitution. There is no separate representation in parliament though people inhabit on these offshore areas for exploiting resources such as fisheries, oil and gas, etc.

The constitution (40th amendment) act, 1976, was passed during the emergency period and received Presidential assent on 27 May 1976. It amended the Article 297 (earlier also amended by the constitution [15th amendment] act, 1963) so as to vest in Union of India all lands, minerals, and other things of value underlying the ocean within the territorial waters or continental shelf or exclusive economic zone of India.

The territorial waters, continental shelf, exclusive economic zone and other maritime zones act, 1976 was enacted by the Indian government to notify the sovereign rights on these areas for dealings with other countries. However, these maritime zones are also parts of the states as they are not separately listed in schedule 1 of the constitution and the role of union government is limited to mainly defending the offshore territory from external threats.

States are not debarred from imposing taxes or royalty on the minerals extracted from the territorial waters and the exclusive economic zone (which are under states jurisdiction) as per serial no. 50 of state list in seventh schedule (Taxes on mineral rights subject to any limitations imposed by the Parliament by law relating to mineral development) of the constitution. Fisheries including in territorial waters is under state jurisdiction (entry 21 of state list, Schedule 7 of Indian Constitution) except fishing and fisheries beyond territorial waters (entry 57 of union list, Schedule 7 of Indian Constitution) which is under union jurisdiction.

== Article 3 ==
Article 3 talks about Formation of new States and alteration of areas, boundaries or names of existing States:

Article 3 says: Parliament may by law:

(a) form a new State by separation of territory from any State or by uniting two or more States or parts of States or by uniting any territory to a part of any State; (b) increase the area of any State; (c) diminish the area of any State; (d) alter the boundaries of any State; or (e) alter the name of any State;

Provided that no Bill for the purpose shall be introduced in either House of Parliament except on the recommendation of the President and unless, where the proposal contained in the Bill affects the area, boundaries or name of any of the States, the Bill has been referred by the President to the Legislature of that State for expressing its views thereon within such period as may be specified in the reference or within such further period as the President may allow and the period so specified or allowed has expired

Explanation I: In this article, in clauses (a) to (e), State includes a Union territory, but in the proviso, State does not include a Union territory

Explanation II: The power conferred on Parliament by clause (a) includes the power to form a new State or Union territory by uniting a part of any State or Union territory to any other State or Union territory

== Article 4 ==
Article 4 is invoked when a law is enacted under Article 2 or 3 for the marginal, incidental and the consequential provisions needed for changing boundary of a state or union territory. As per Article 4 (2), no such law framed under Article 4 (1), shall be deemed to be an amendment of the constitution for the purposes of article 368.

== See also ==
- List of amendments of the Constitution of India (refer amendments 5, 7 & 18 for Article 3)
- List of Indian federal legislation
- Constituent Assembly of India
