= Z6 =

Z6 may refer to:

- Z6 small nucleolar RNA
- Motorola ROKR Z6, a cell phone
- SP&S Class Z-6, a steam locomotives class, see List of Spokane, Portland and Seattle Railway locomotives
- Harbin/CHDRI Z-6, one of China's first domestically-developed helicopters
- the IATA code of Dniproavia, an airline of Ukraine
- the Beijing-Nanning-Hanoi Through Train (northbound)
- LNER Class Z6, a class of British steam locomotives
- Zbrojovka Z6 Hurvínek, a Czechoslovak car of the 1930s
- Nikon Z6, a full-frame mirrorless camera produced by Nikon
  - Nikon Z6II, a reworked model of the previous
  - Nikon Z6III, a reworked model of the previous

== See also ==
- 6Z (disambiguation)
