= Z18 small nucleolar RNA =

Small nucleolar RNA SNORD74
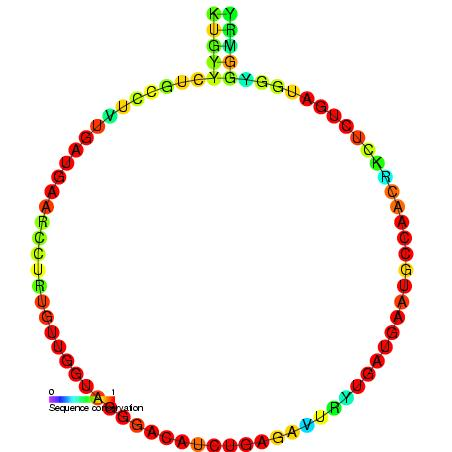
- Predicted secondary structure and sequence conservation of SNORD74

Identifiers
- Symbol: SNORD74
- Alt. Symbols: snoZ18; Z18
- Rfam: RF00284

Other data
- RNA type: Gene; snRNA; snoRNA; CD-box
- Domain: Eukaryota
- GO: GO:0006396 GO:0005730
- SO: SO:0000593
- PDB structures: PDBe

Z18 small nucleolar RNA (also known as SNORD74 and U74) is a non-coding RNA (ncRNA) molecule which functions in the modification of other small nuclear RNAs (snRNAs). This type of modifying RNA is usually located in the nucleolus of the eukaryotic cell which is a major site of snRNA biogenesis. It is known as a small nucleolar RNA (snoRNA) and also often referred to as a guide RNA. Z18 snoRNA belongs to the C/D box class of snoRNAs which contain the conserved sequence motifs known as the C box (UGAUGA) and the D box (CUGA). Most of the members of the box C/D family function in directing site-specific 2'-O-methylation of substrate RNAs.

== See also ==
- Z6 small nucleolar RNA
- Z12 small nucleolar RNA
- Z30 small nucleolar RNA
