= U74 =

U74 may refer to:

- German submarine U-74, various vessels
- Great retrosnub icosidodecahedron
- HMAS Swan (U74), a sloop of the Royal Australian Navy
- Z18 small nucleolar RNA
- U74, a line of the Düsseldorf Stadtbahn
