= Z30 =

Z30 may refer to:

- BlackBerry Z30, a smartphone
- Casio Exilim Z30, a digital camera
- German destroyer Z30
- Nikon Z30, a crop-sensor mirrorless camera produced by Nikon
- Toyota Soarer Z30, an automobile
- Z30 small nucleolar RNA
