= Z12 =

Z12 may refer to:

- Z12 small nucleolar RNA, a non-coding RNA molecule which functions in the modification of other small nuclear RNAs
- German destroyer Z12 Erich Giese, a Type 1934A destroyer built for the German Navy in the late 1930s
- New South Wales Z12 class locomotive, a class of 4-4-0 steam locomotives built for and operated by the New South Wales Government Railways of Australia
- EX-Z12, a Casio Exilim model
- the train code for an express train between Shenyang and Beijing
