= Nikon Nikkor Z 24-70 mm f/4 S =

Nikkor Z 24-70 mm f/4 S
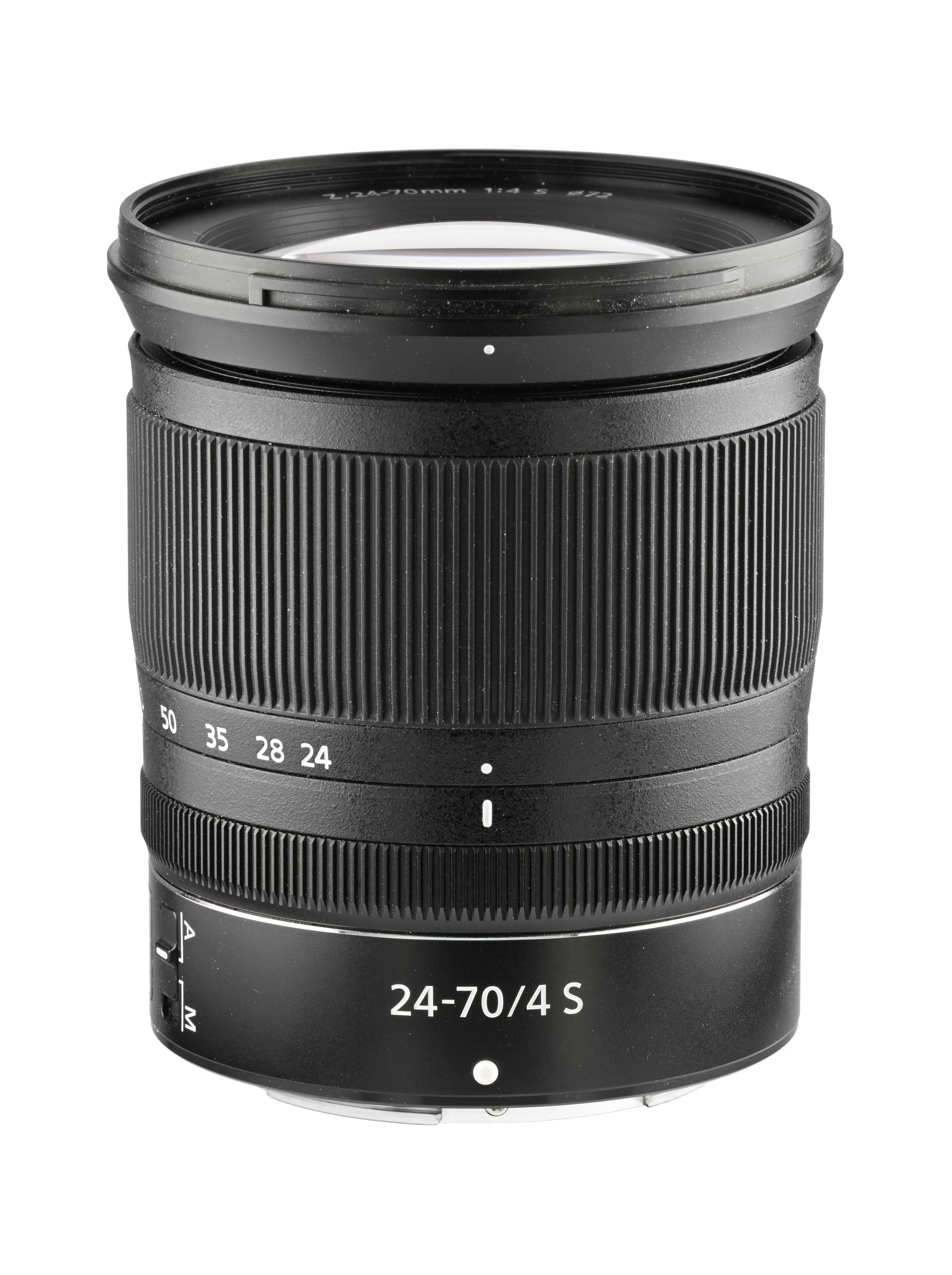
- Maker: Nikon
- Lens mount: Z-mount

Technical data
- Type: Zoom
- Focus drive: Stepping motor
- Focal length: 24-70mm
- Image format: FX (full frame)
- Aperture (max/min): f/4–22
- Close focus distance: 0.3m
- Max. magnification: 1:3.3
- Diaphragm blades: 7 (rounded)
- Construction: 14 elements in 11 groups

Features
- Lens-based stabilization: No No
- Macro capable: No No
- Unique features: S-Line lens Nano Crystal Coat elements Fluorine Coat
- Application: Standard zoom

Physical
- Max. length: 88.5 mm
- Diameter: 77.5 mm
- Weight: 500 g
- Filter diameter: 72 mm

Software
- Latest firmware: 1.01 (as of 7 April 2020)
- User flashable: Yes Yes
- Lens ID: 1

Accessories
- Lens hood: HB-85 (bayonet)
- Case: CL-C1

Angle of view
- Diagonal: 84°–34°20' (FX); 61°–22°50' (DX)

History
- Introduction: August 2018

Retail info
- MSRP: 999.95 USD (as of 2018)

The Nikon Nikkor Z 24-70 mm f/4 S is a full-frame standard zoom lens with a constant aperture of f/4, manufactured by Nikon for use on Nikon Z-mount mirrorless cameras. It is one of the first three lenses announced for the Z-mount, introduced in 2018.

== Introduction ==
On August 23, 2018, Nikon announced the first three lenses for the Z-mount, one of which was the Nikkor Z 24-70 mm f/4 S (along with the Nikkor Z 35 mm f/1.8 S and Nikkor Z 50 mm f/1.8 S). The lens has a retractable design, making it more compact when not in use. The lens comes with a bayonet-type lens hood (HB-85).

The lens achieved a DXOMark score of 29.

== Features ==
- 24-70 mm focal length (approximately equivalent field of view of a 36-105 mm lens when used on a DX format camera)
- S-Line lens
- Autofocus using a stepping motor (STM), focus-by-wire manual focus ring
- 14 elements in 11 groups (including 1 aspherical ED glass, 1 ED glass, 3 aspherical lens elements, elements with Nano Crystal Coat, and a fluorine-coated front lens element)
- 7-blade rounded diaphragm
- Internal focusing (IF lens)
- One customizable control ring at the back (manual focusing by default, aperture, ISO and exposure compensation functions can be assigned to it)
- A/M switch for autofocus/manual focus modes
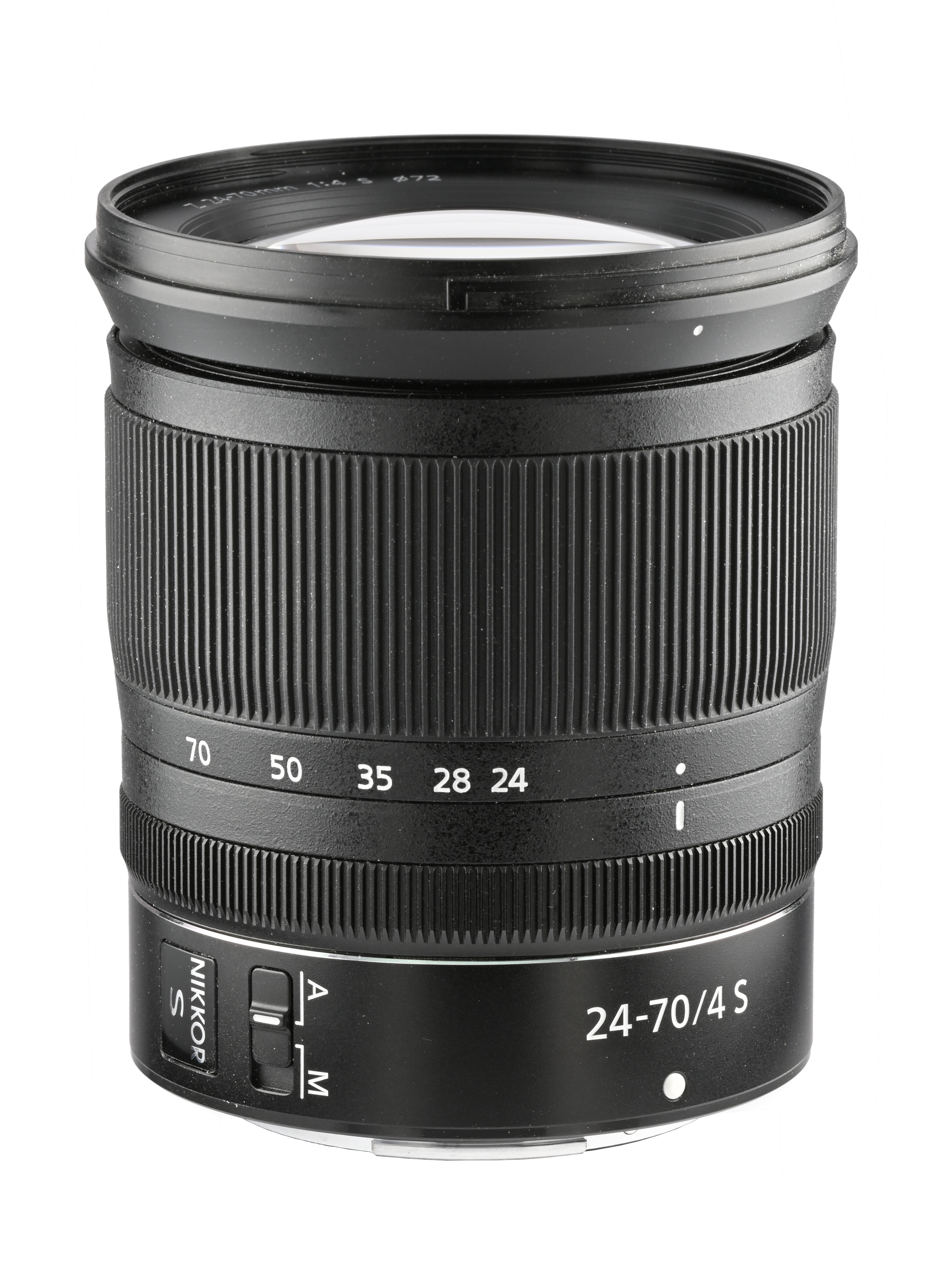

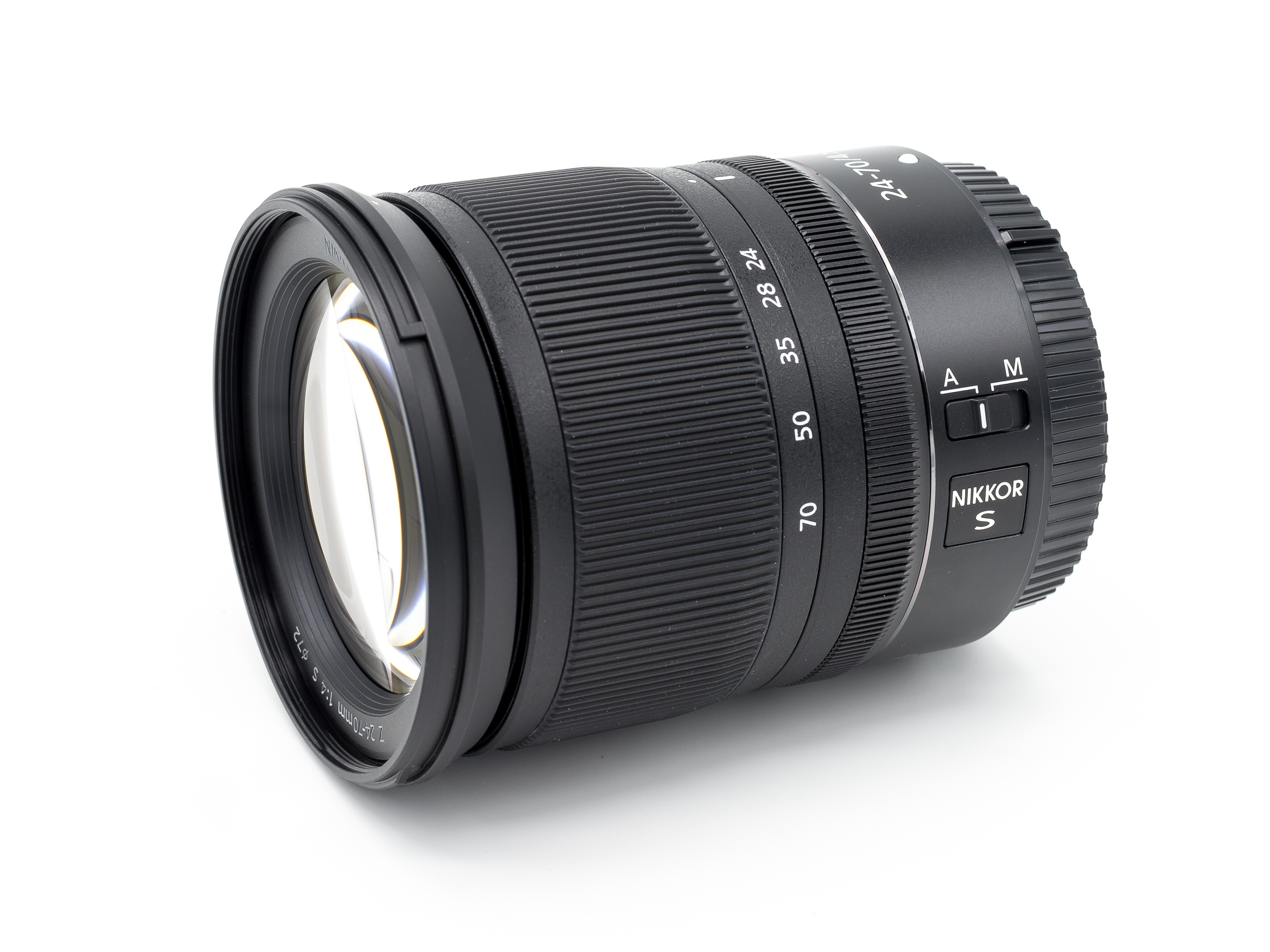

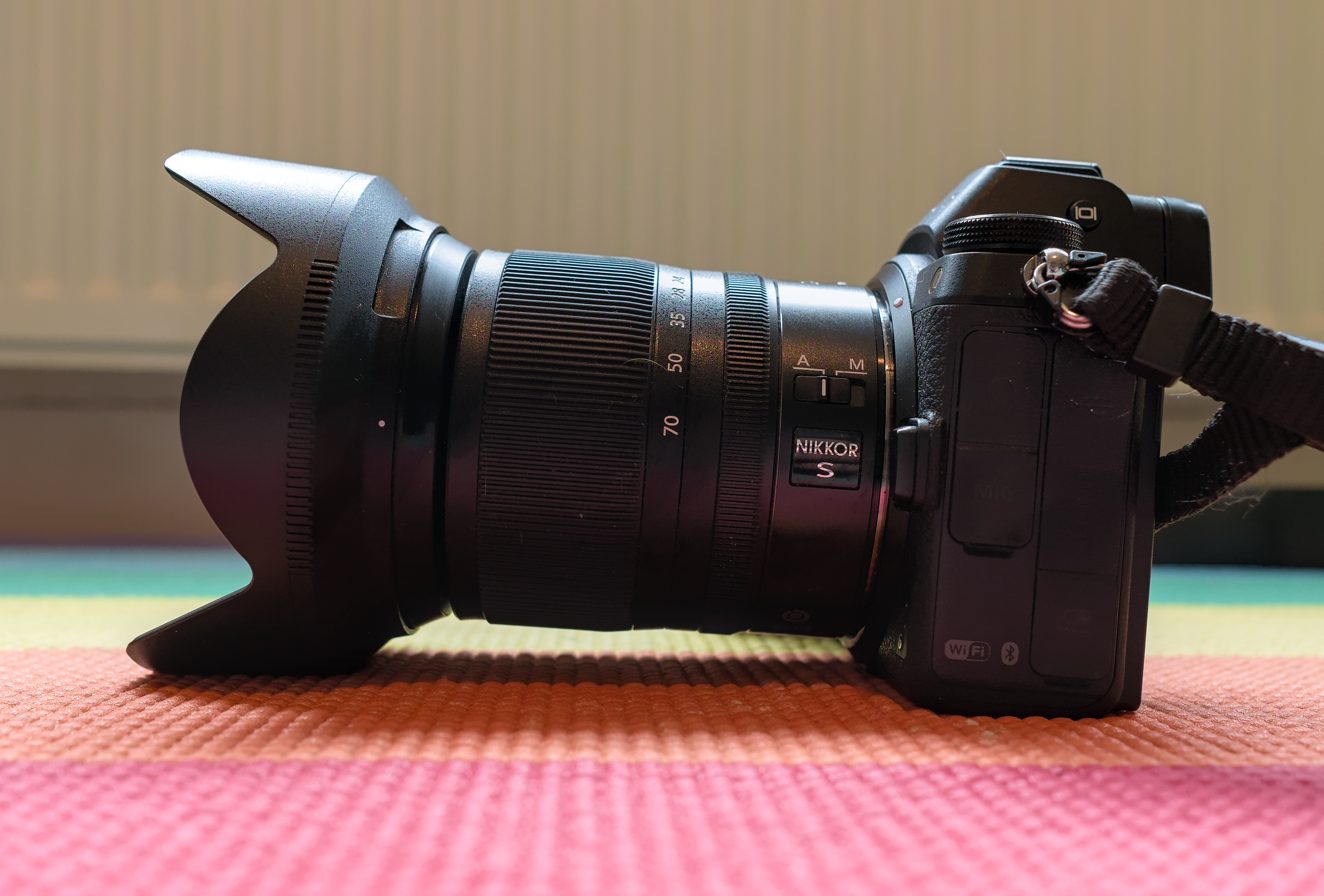
With lens hood attached, on a Nikon Z6

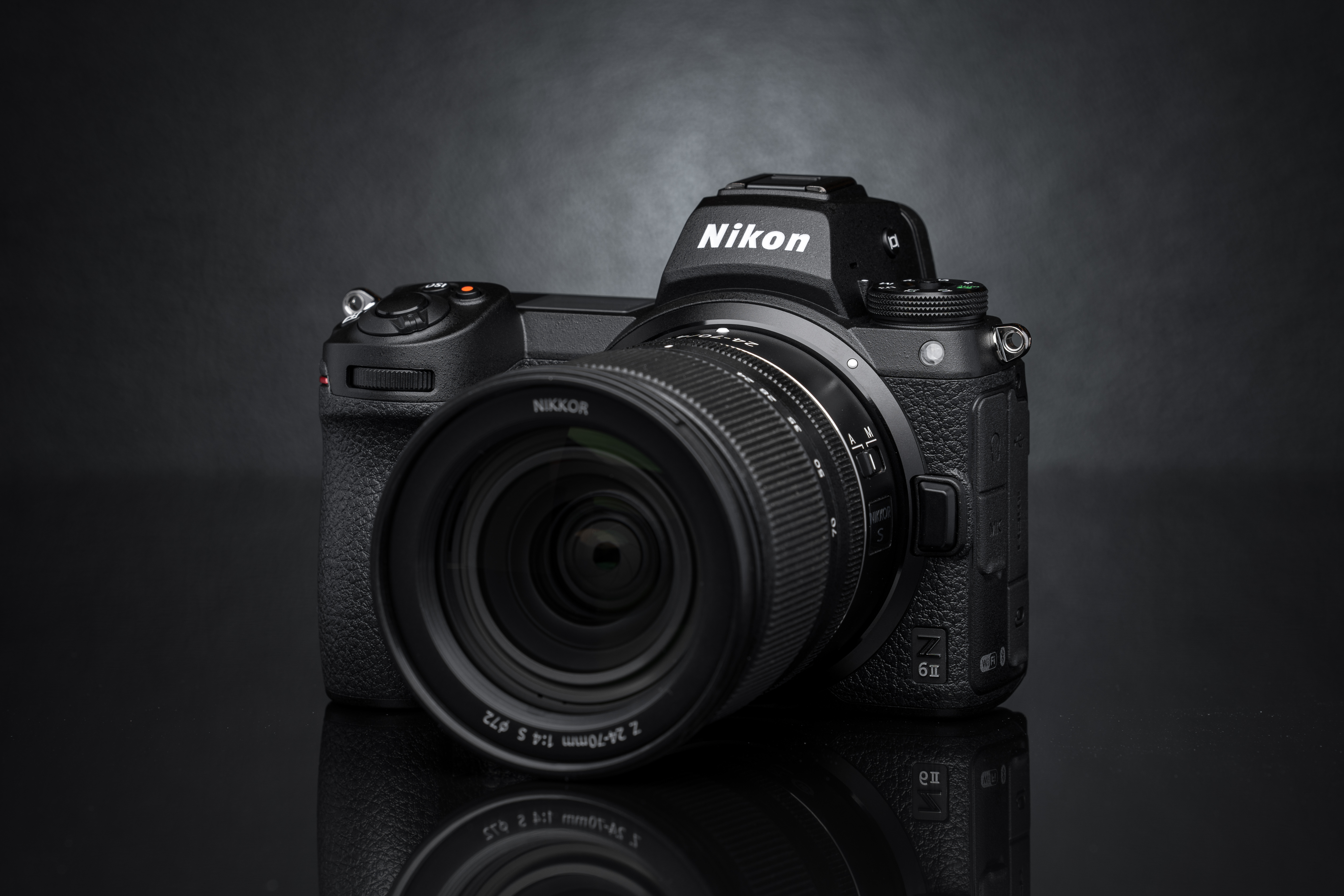
On a Z6II

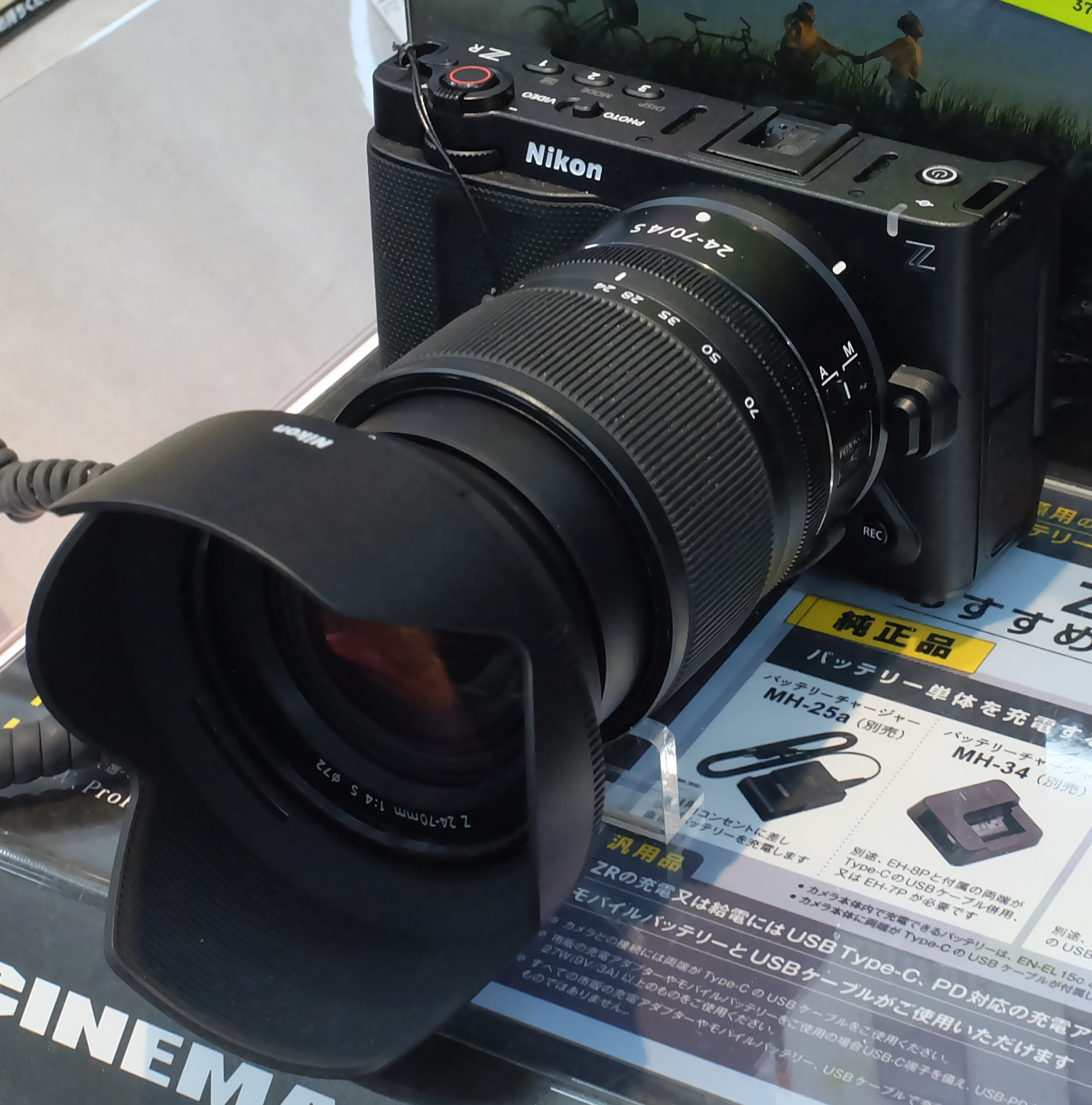
On a ZR

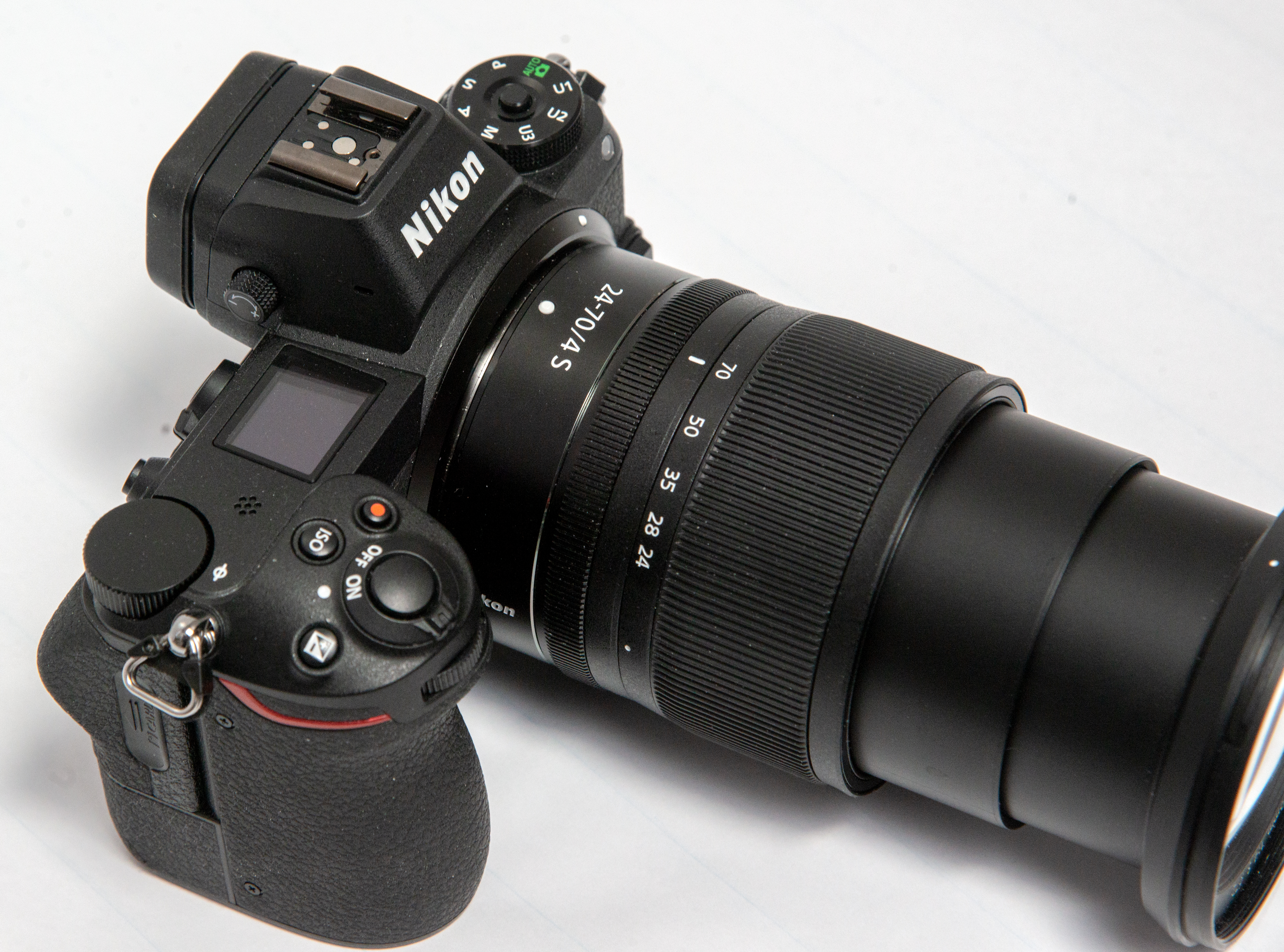
Extended zoom barrel at 70 mm, on a Z7

== Sample images ==
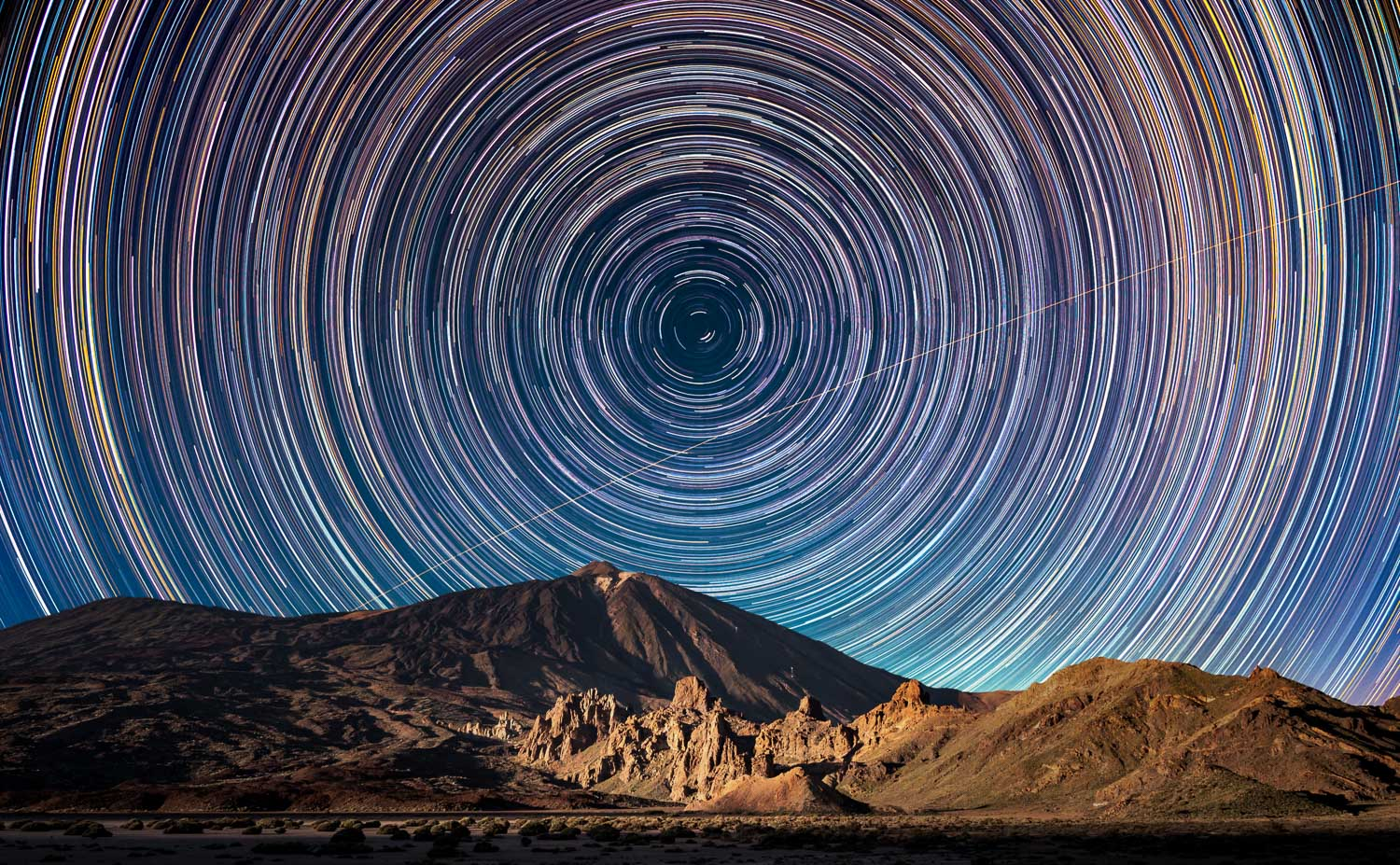
At 24 mm, sky at f/4, foreground at f/8

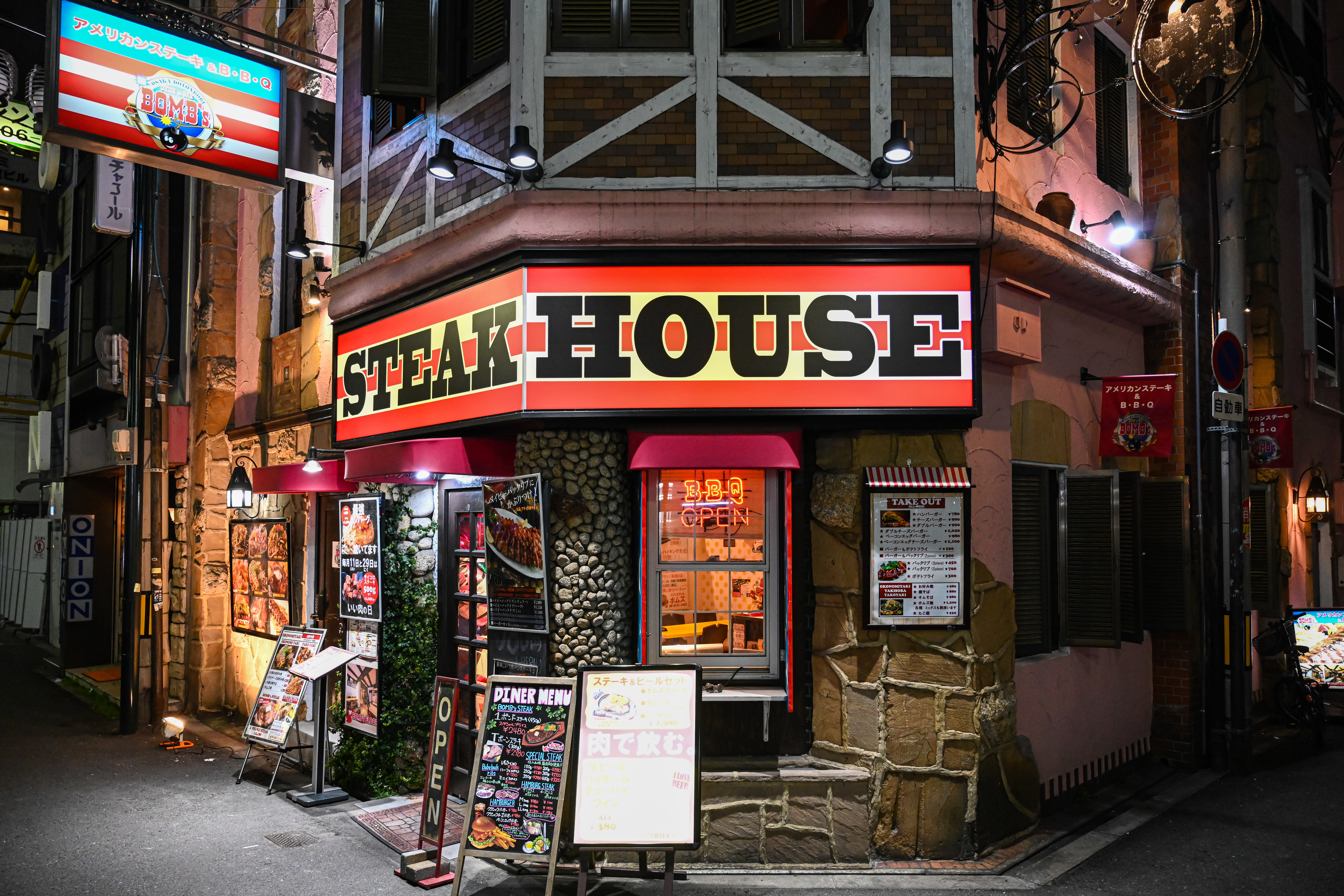
At 24 mm, f/5

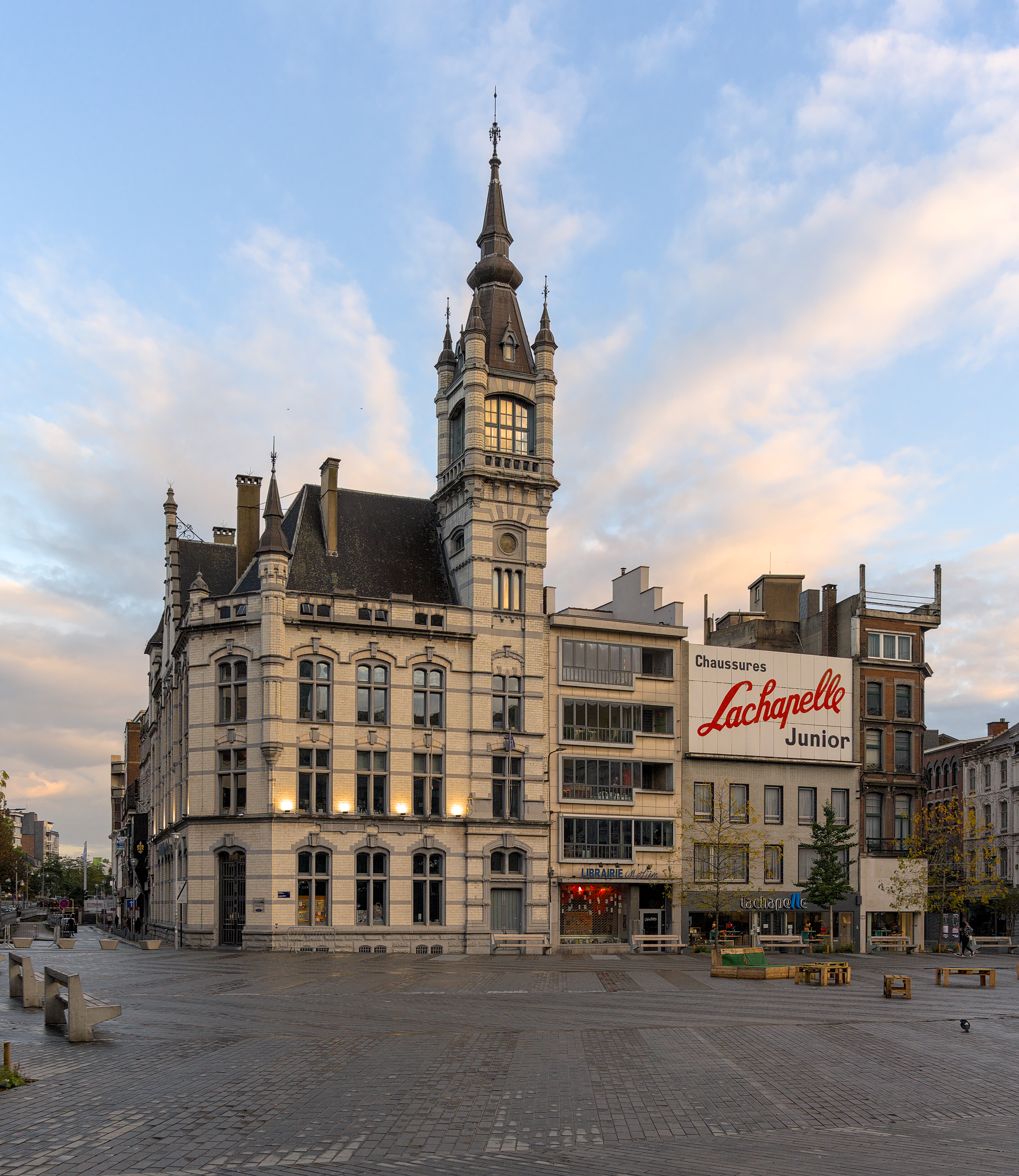
At 24 mm, f/5.6

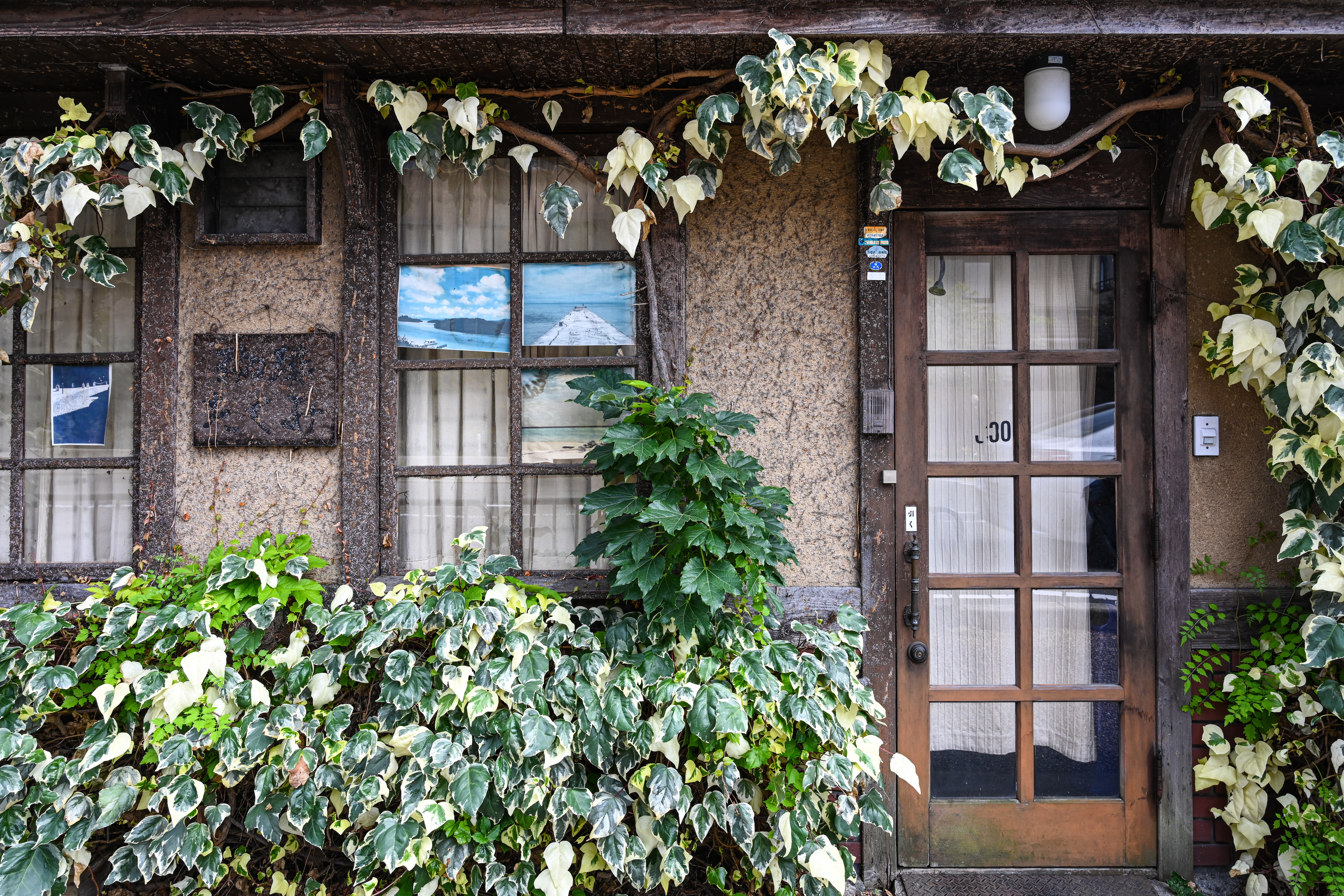
At 24 mm, f/6.3

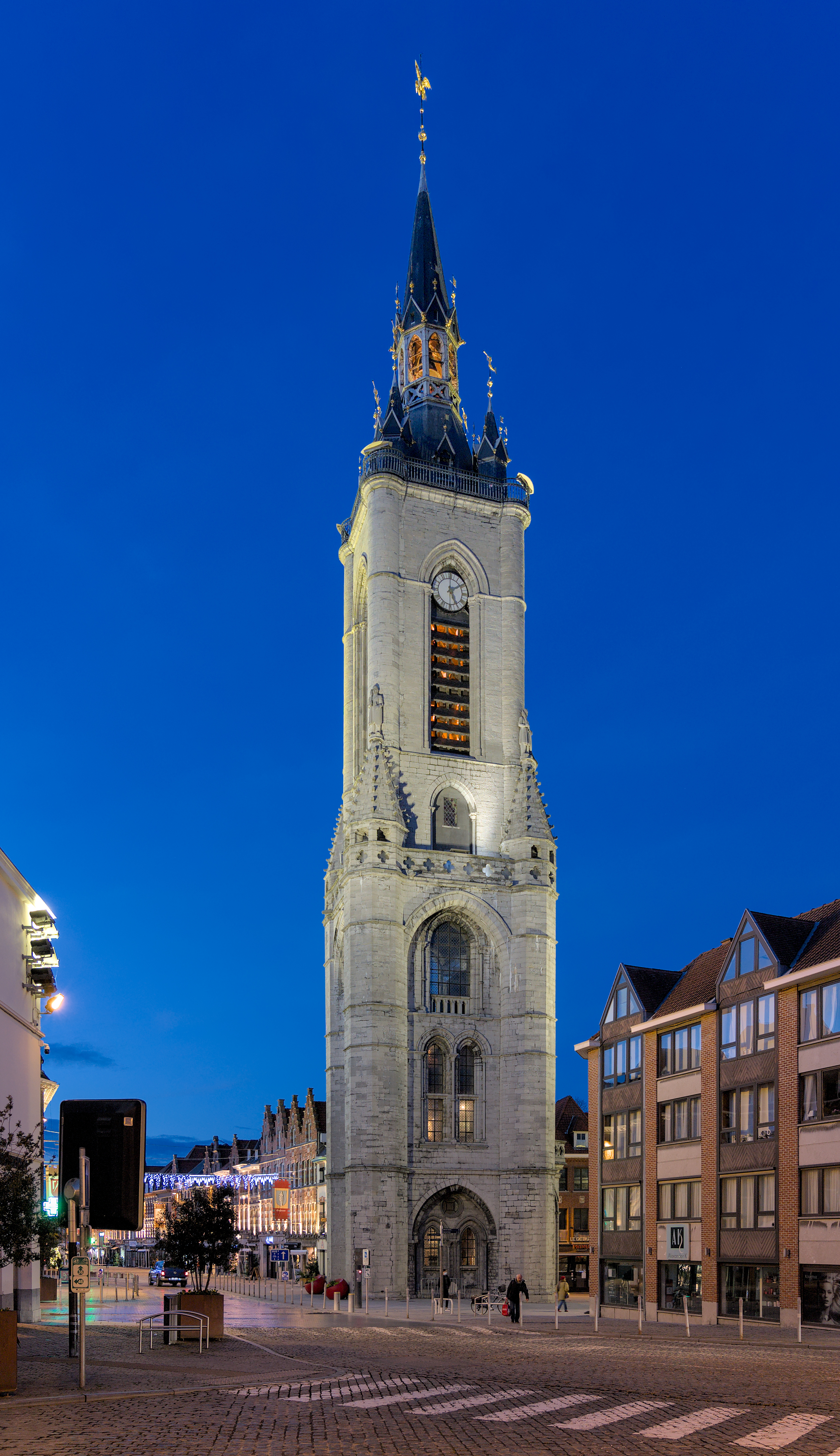
At 26 mm, f/4

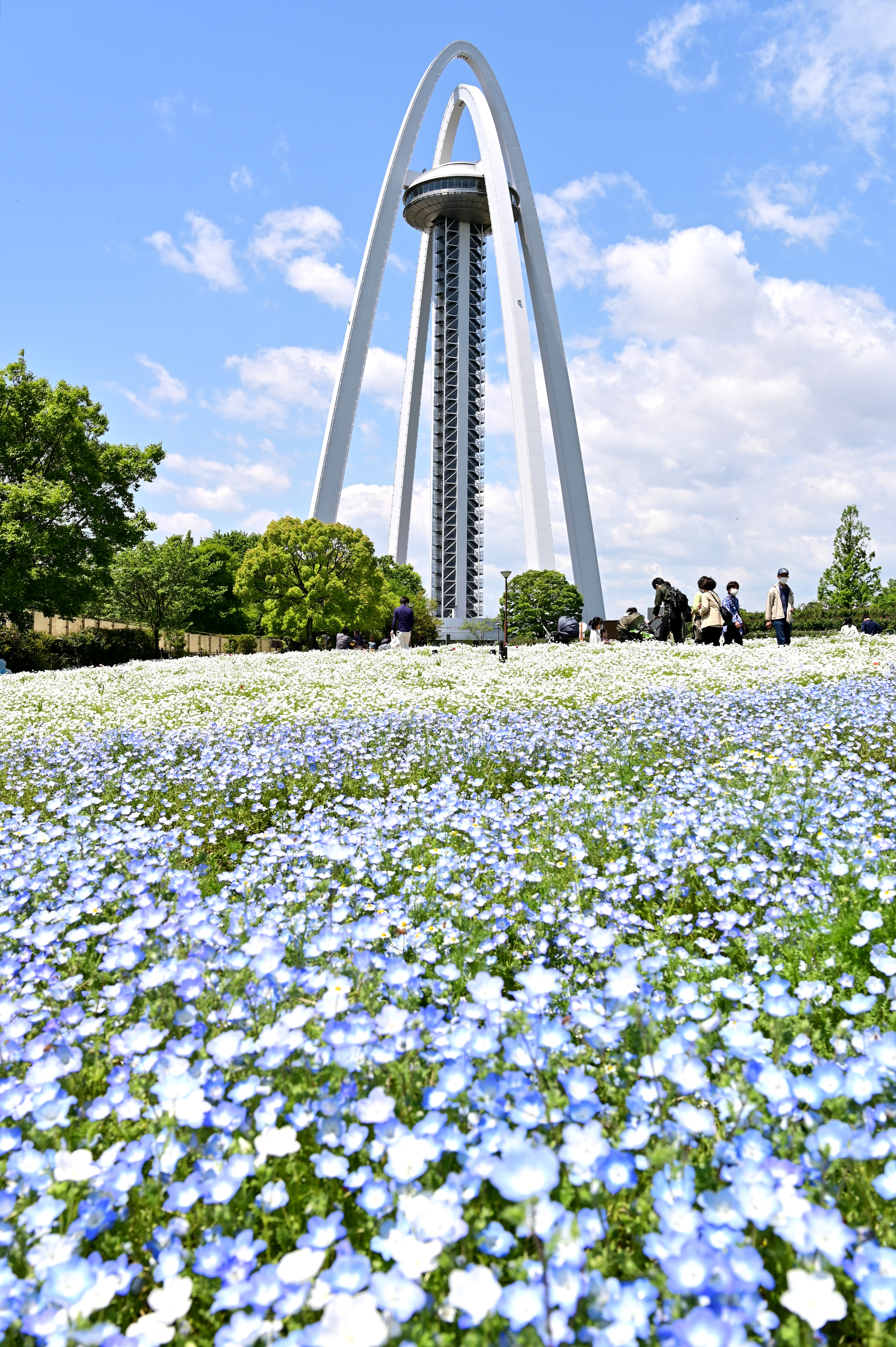
At 30 mm, f/8

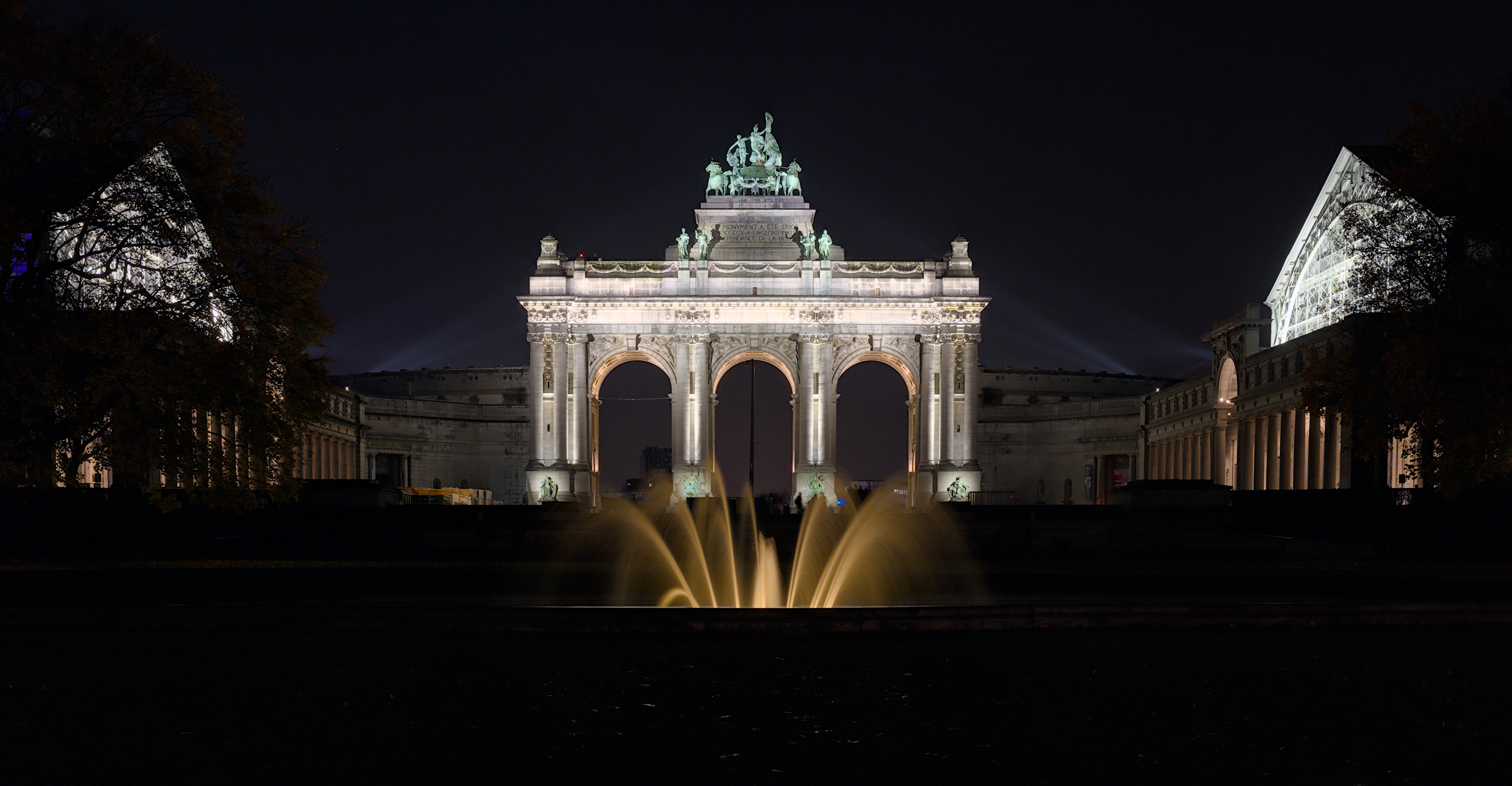
At 41 mm, f/11

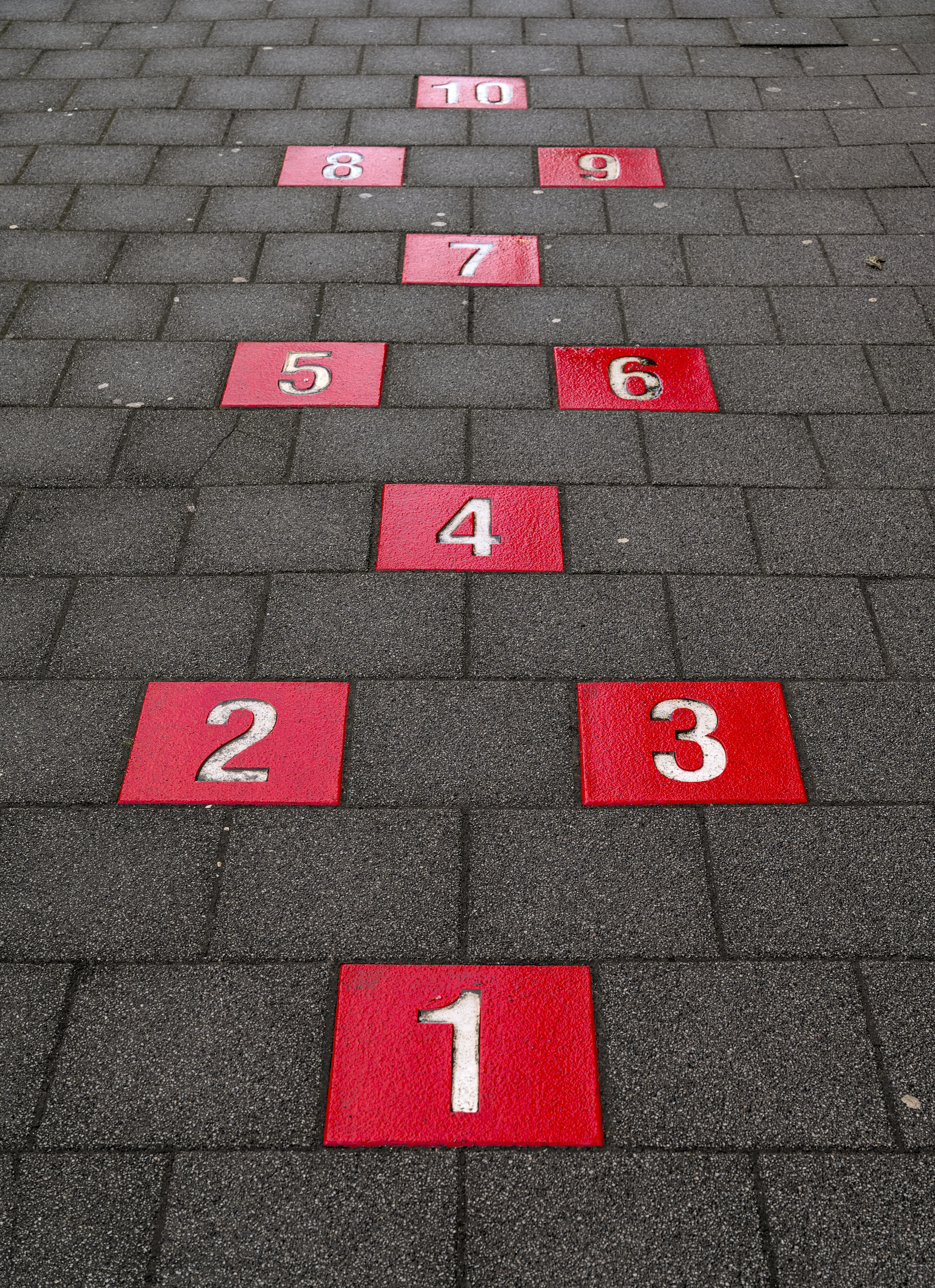
At 48 mm, f/8

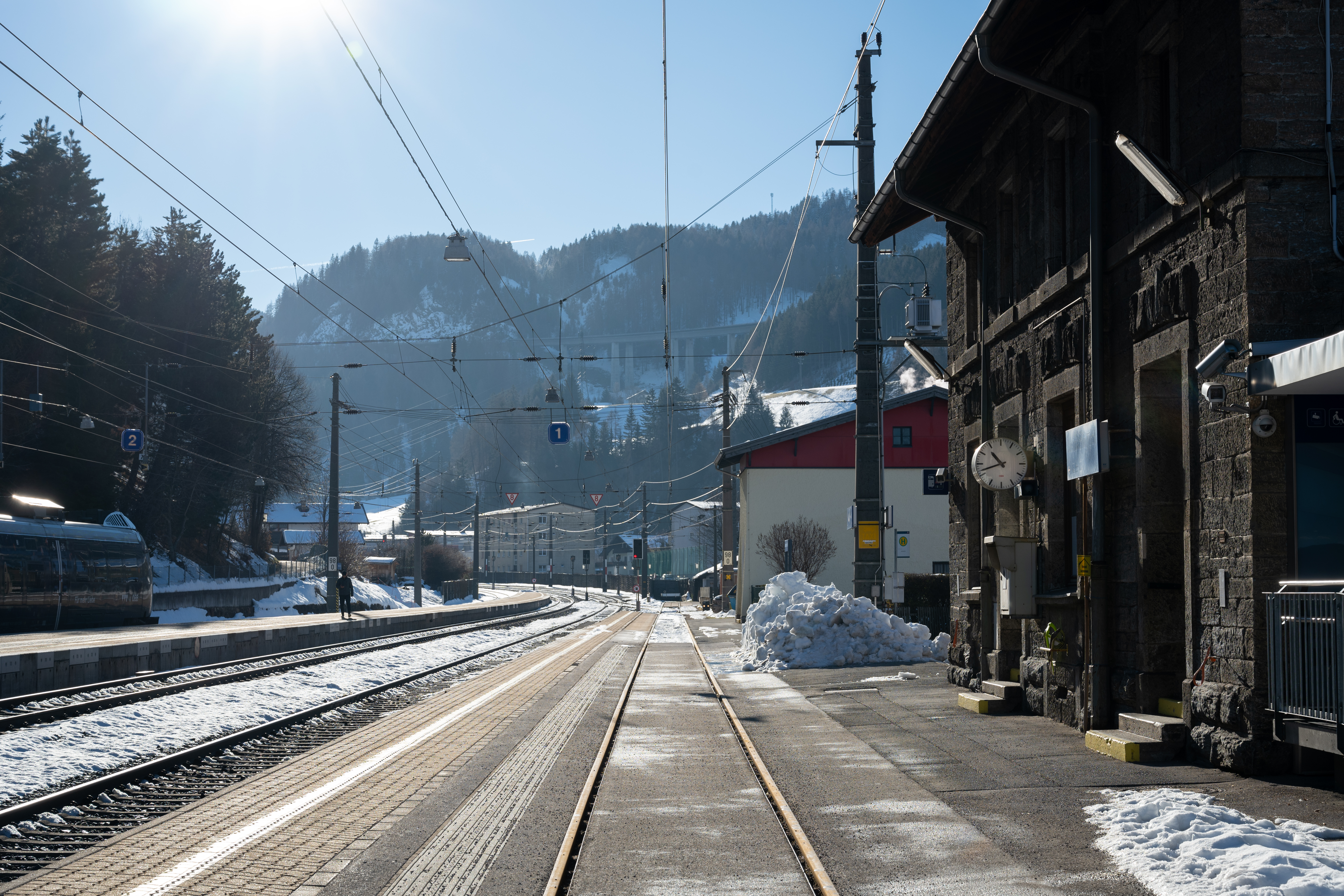
At 54 mm, f/7.1

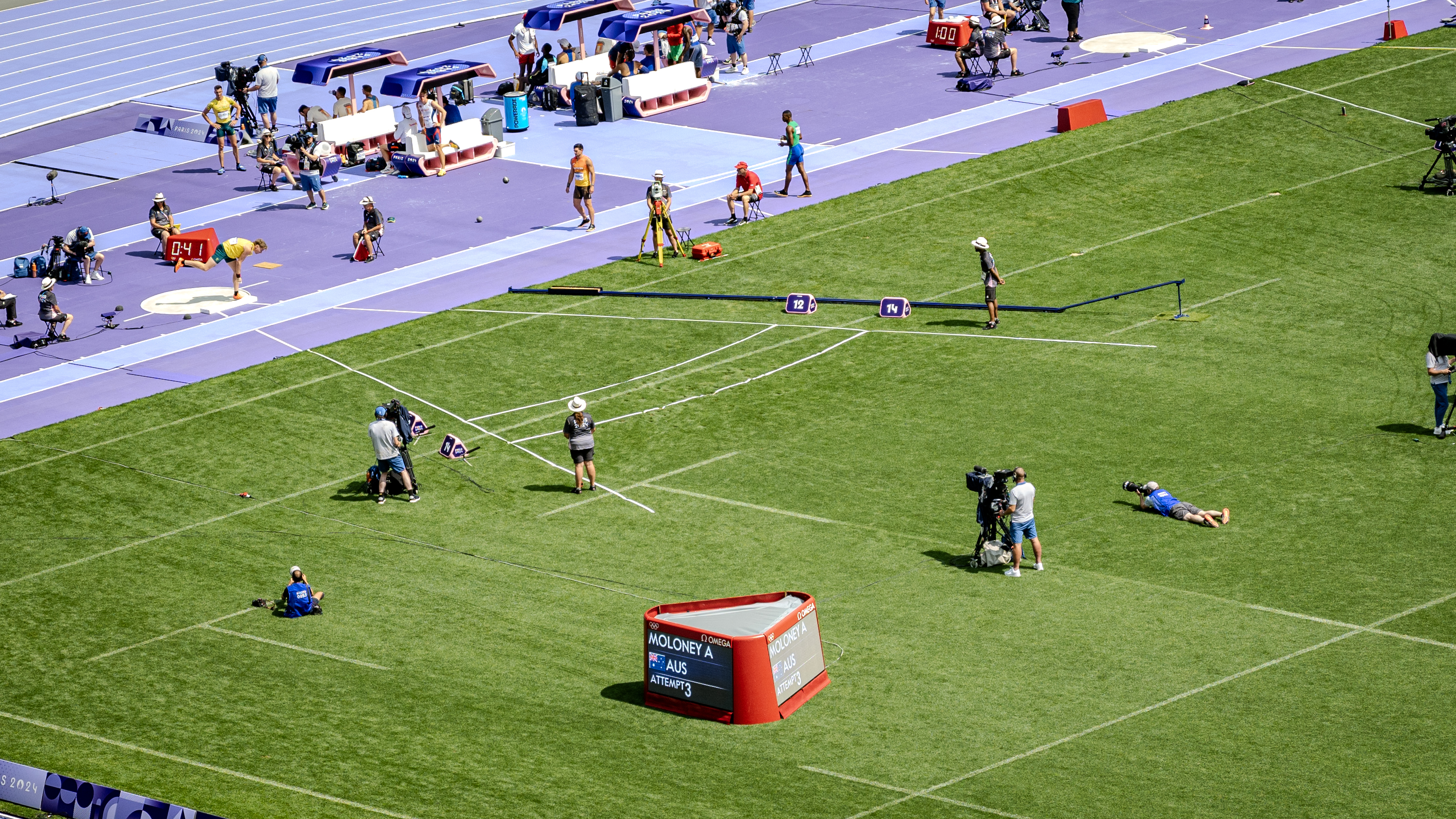
At 70 mm, f/4

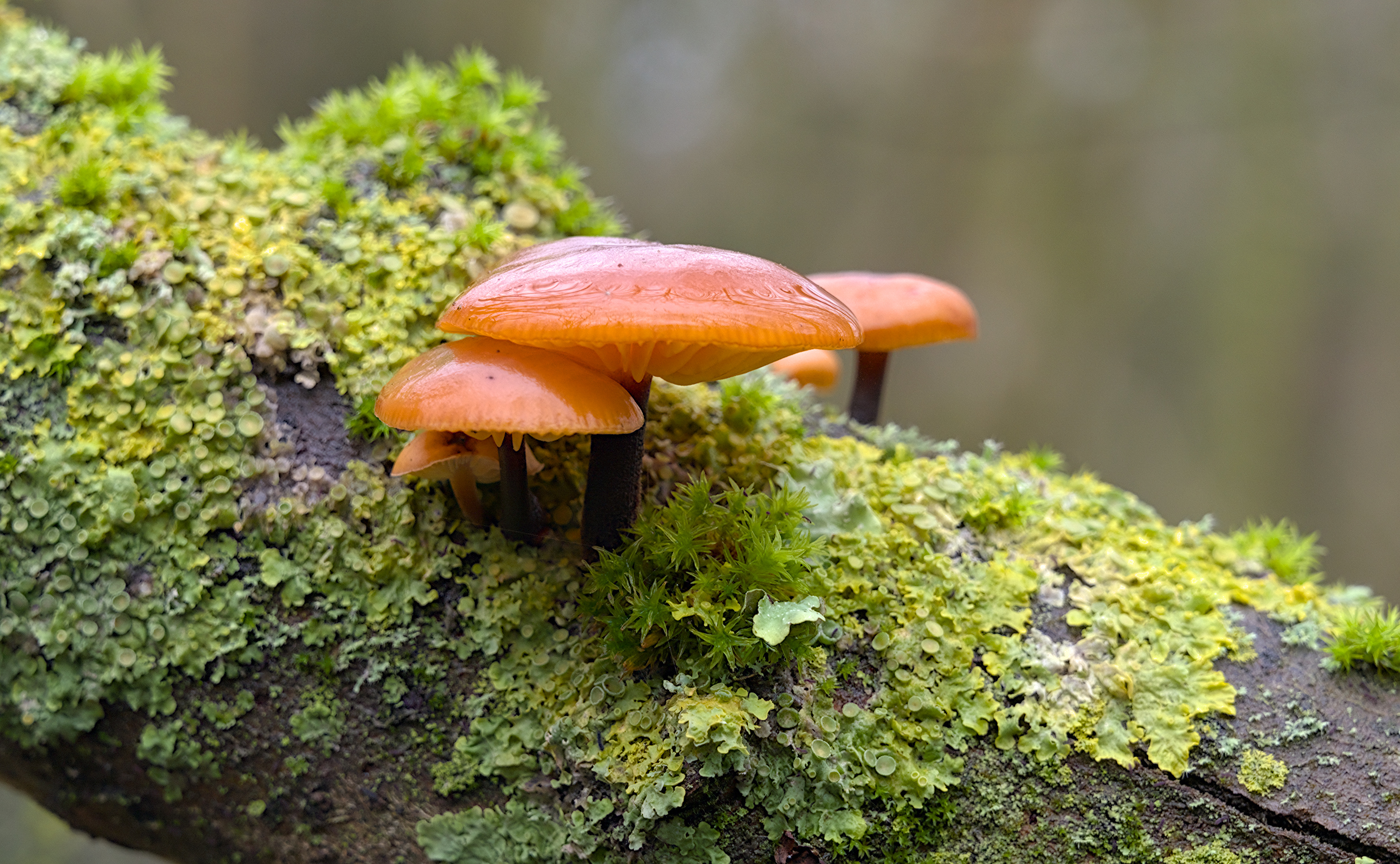
At 70 mm, f/8

== See also ==
- Nikon Z-mount
