= German weather ship Sachsenwald =

Kriegsmarine ship sunk in 1944

Coordinates: 46°32′N 2°09′W

History

Nazi Germany
- Name: Sachsenwald
- Namesake: Sachsenwald
- Owner: Nordsee Deutsche Hochseefischerei Bremen-Cuxhaven (1939–40); Kriegsmarine (1940–44)
- Builder: DeSchiMAG, Seebeck
- Yard number: 631
- Launched: June 1939
- Decommissioned: January 1940
- Identification: Fishing boat registration PC 318 (1939–40); Pennant Number WBS 7 (1940–41); Pennant Number V 414 (1941–44)
- Fate: Sunk on 6 August 1944 off Les Sables-d'Olonne

General characteristics
- Class & type: Converted trawler
- Tonnage: 650 GRT
- Displacement: 1,425 t (1,402 long tons)
- Length: 62.85 m (206 ft 2 in)
- Beam: 8.53 m (28 ft)
- Draught: 5.03 m (16 ft 6 in)
- Depth: 4.43 m (14 ft 6 in)
- Installed power: 1,000 PS (740 kW; 990 ihp)
- Propulsion: Triple expansion engine
- Speed: 12.5 knots (23.2 km/h; 14.4 mph)
- Range: 8,500 nmi (15,700 km; 9,800 mi) at 12 knots (22 km/h; 14 mph)
- Complement: 60
- Armament: 1 × 8.8 cm (3.5 in) deck gun; 1 × 3.7 cm (1.5 in) SK C/30 AA gun; 2 × 2 cm (0.79 in) C/30 quad AA guns; 2 × 2 cm (0.79 in) C/30 AA guns; 2 × 1.5 cm (0.59 in) AA guns; depth charges

Sachsenwald was a fishing trawler that was requisitioned by the Kriegsmarine during the Second World War. She served as a supply ship, the weather ship WBS 7 Sachsenwald and the vorpostenboot V 414 Sachsenwald. She was sunk in the Bay of Biscay in August 1944 by Royal Navy and Royal Canadian Navy ships.

== Description ==
Sachsenwald was 62.84 metres (206 ft 2 in) long, with a beam of 8.53 metres (28 ft 0 in). She had a depth of 4.43 metres (14 ft 6 in) and a draught of 5.03 metres (16 ft 6 in). She was assessed at 650 GRT, 240 NRT. She was powered by a triple expansion steam engine, which had cylinders of 37.9 centimetres (14 15/16 in), 61 centimetres (24 in) and 75 centimetres (29 5/8 in) diameter by 66 centimetres (26 in) stroke. The engine was made by Deschimag Seebeckwerft, Wesermünde, Germany. It was rated at 168nhp. The engine powered a single screw propeller driven via a low pressure turbine, double reduction gearing and a hydraulic coupling. It could propel the ship at 12.5 knots (23.2 km/h).

== History ==
Sachsenwald was built as yard number 631 by Deschimag Seebeckwerft for the Nordsee Deutsche Hochseefischerei Bremen-Cuxhaven. She was launched in June 1939. Her port of registry was Wesermünde. At the outbreak of the Second World War, she was interned in Murmansk, Soviet Union, but was requisitioned by the Kriegsmarine in January 1940. Initially serving as a supply ship allocated to Basis Nord, Sachsenwald was intended for use in Operation Sea Lion before being converted for use as a weather ship under the designation Wetterbeobachtungsschiff 7, with the Pennant number WBS 7.

=== Bismarck survivors ===
Sachsenwald was returning from a 50-day operational cruise in the Atlantic under her commander, the experienced trawler skipper Ernst Wilhelm Schütte, when she received orders on 27 May 1941 to move to the area where the Bismarck was known to be. After sailing through heavy seas, and being briefly attacked by a Bristol Blenheim aircraft with machine gun fire, she reached the debris field left after the sinking of Bismarck on 28 May. After several hours searching the field, which contained only bodies and debris, Sachsenwald communicated with two U-boats that were also searching the area. Finally, late in the night, they discovered a raft containing two survivors, and took them on board. They were Matrosengefreite Walter Lorenzen and Otto Maus.^{[a]} Sachsenwald continued to search the area, recovering an empty raft from Bismarck but failed to find any more survivors. She briefly communicated with the Spanish cruiser Canarias, which was also searching the area, before making for the French coast on 31 May, escorted by several patrol boats. She reached it without incident, discharging the survivors, and tying up at Bordeaux on 1 June.

=== Sinking ===
On 29 August 1941, WBS 7 Sachsenwald was renamed a vorpostenboot (patrol boat). She was allocated to 4 Vorpostenbootflotille operating in the Bay of Biscay from Bordeaux. She served as V 414 Sachsenwald. In August 1944 she formed part of a seven-ship convoy, that included Otto, V 1549 Höheweg, M 263, M 486 and SG 3 Sans Souchi, which was carrying ammunition from St. Nazaire to La Pallice. They were intercepted early in the morning of 6 August by Force 26, which was carrying out Operation Kinetic. The task force, consisting of the cruiser HMS Bellona, and the destroyers HMS Ashanti, HMS Tartar, HMCS Haida and HMCS Iroquois, attacked the convoy, sinking at least six of the ships, including Sachsenwald. The wreck lies in 180 ft (55 m) of water.

== Notes ==
a. A number of internet sources state that Sachsenwald recovered five Bismarck survivors. This appears to be a widely repeated error based on a faulty source. The official report of Sachsenwald's commander states only two survivors were picked up, Lorenzen and Maus. The other 3 Bismarck survivors rescued by the Germans (Georg Herzog, Otto Höntzsch & Herbert Manthey) were all rescued by the German U-boat U-74.

== Bibliography ==
- Gröner, Erich (1988). Hilfsschiffe II: Lazarettschiffe, Wohnschiffe, Schulschiffe, Forschungsfahrzeuge, Hafenbetriebsfahrzeuge (I). Die deutschen Kriegsschiffe 1815–1945 (in German). Vol. V. Koblenz: Bernard & Graefe. ISBN 3-7637-4804-0.
- Gröner, Erich (1993). Flußfahrzeuge, Ujäger, Vorpostenboote, Hilfsminensucher, Küstenschutzverbände (Teil 1). Die deutschen Kriegsschiffe 1815–1945 (in German). Vol. VIII. Koblenz: Bernard & Graefe. ISBN 3-7637-4807-5.
