= 6Z =

6Z or 6-Z may refer to:

- 6Z, IATA code for South African airline Panavia
- 6Z, IATA code for Ukrainian Cargo Airways
- 6Z, the production code for the 1985 Doctor Who serial Revelation of the Daleks
- Class 6Z locomotive; see South African Class 6A 4-6-0
- Asus ZenFone 6, known as the Asus 6Z in the Indian market

== See also ==
- Z6 (disambiguation)
