= Nikon Z6 =

Full-frame mirrorless interchangeable-lens camera

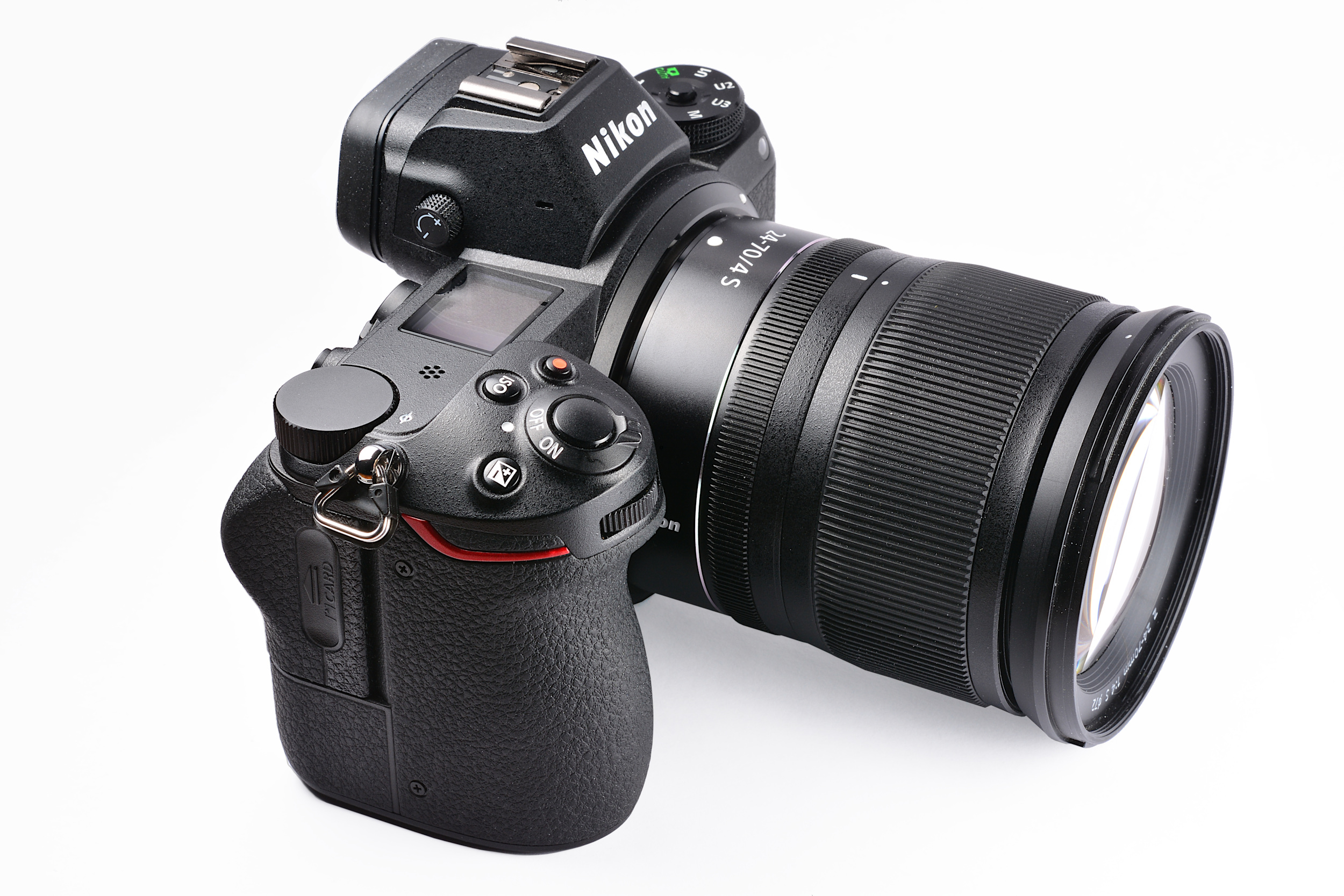
- Z6 + NIKKOR Z 24-70mm f/4 S

Overview
- Maker: Nikon
- Type: Full-frame mirrorless interchangeable-lens camera
- Production: 2018-11-16 through 2022-9-9 (3 years 10 months)
- Intro price: USD $1,999.95

Lens
- Lens mount: Nikon Z-mount

Sensor/medium
- Sensor type: Back-illuminated CMOS sensor
- Sensor size: Full frame (35.9 x 23.9 mm)
- Sensor maker: Sony
- Maximum resolution: 6048 x 4024 (24.5 effective megapixels)
- Film speed: Native range of ISO 100-51,200 (expandable to 50-204,800)
- Recording medium: 1 × CFexpress Type B / XQD

Focusing
- Focus: Single-servo AF (AF-S); Continuous-servo AF (AF-C); Full-time AF (AF-F; only available in video mode); Predictive focus tracking Manual focus (electronic rangefinder can be used)
- Focus modes: Pinpoint; Single-point; Dynamic-area AF; Wide-area AF (small); Wide-area AF (large); Auto-area AF
- Focus areas: 273 points (single-point AF) with 90% coverage

Exposure/metering
- Exposure: TTL metering using camera image sensor
- Exposure modes: Programmed Auto [P] with flexible program; Shutter-Priority Auto [S]; Aperture-Priority Auto [A]; Manual [M]
- Exposure metering: TTL metering using camera image sensor Highlight-weighted metering: -4 to +17 EV (ISO 100, f/2.0 lens, 20 °C/68 °F)
- Metering modes: Matrix metering Center-weighted metering Spot metering

Flash
- Flash: Built-in: No; Hot shoe

Shutter
- Frame rate: Up to 12fps in 12-bit RAW and single-point autofocus
- Shutter: Electronically controlled vertical-travel focal-plane mechanical shutter, Electronic front-curtain shutter
- Shutter speeds: 30s - 1/8000s

Viewfinder
- Viewfinder: Quad-VGA (1280x960) EVF (3690000 dots)

Image processing
- Image processor: EXPEED 6
- White balance: Auto (3 types); Custom; Cloudy; Direct sunlight Flash; Fluorescent (7 types); Incandescent; Natural light auto Preset manual (up to 6 values can be stored, all with fine-tuning); Shade

General
- Video recording: 1080p video at up to 120 fps, and 4K video at up to 30 fps
- LCD screen: 3.2-inch tilting TFT LCD with 2.1 million dots with touchscreen
- Battery: EN-EL15b
- Optional accessories: MB-N10 battery grip (no controls); MC-N10 remote grip (fw. 3.60+)
- AV port(s): USB Type-C, HDMI Type-C
- Data port(s): IEEE 802.11b/g/n/a/ac/Wi-Fi, Bluetooth Low Energy
- Body features: In-Body Image Stabilization
- Dimensions: 134×100.5×67.5 mm (5.28×3.96×2.66 in)
- Weight: 585 g (21 oz) (body only); 675 g (including battery and memory card)
- Latest firmware: 3.80 / 13 May 2025; 17 months ago
- Made in: Japan

Chronology
- Successor: Nikon Z6II

The Nikon Z6 is a full-frame mirrorless interchangeable-lens camera produced by Nikon. The camera was officially announced on August 23, 2018, to be released in November. Nikon began shipping the Z6 to retailers on November 16, 2018. This was the second camera to use Nikon's new Z-mount system after the release of the 45.75 megapixel Nikon Z7 in September 2018.

This more-affordable 24.5 mega-pixel full-frame model offers nearly all of the same specifications as the Z7. Aside from the lower resolution, differences include fewer phase-detection autofocus points (273 compared to 493) and an added anti-aliasing filter. The fewer mega-pixels allow for some benefits: a higher ISO equivalent, faster 12 fps (vs. 9 fps) drive speed, greater burst depth, and the ability to capture oversampled 4K video in full-frame up to 30 fps (and also in APS-C Crop, 10 MP APS-C still images can be captured) recording.

Three Z-mount lenses were available by December 2018, the Nikkor Z 24-70 mm f/4 S, the 35 mm f/1.8 S and the 50 mm f/1.8 S, all three covering a full-frame (FX) image size. Nikon F-mount lenses can be used, with various degrees of compatibility, via the Nikon FTZ (F-to-Z) (and the later FTZ II) mount adapters. In late 2018, Nikon also published a "roadmap" of lenses to be released between 2019 and 2021. A total of nine products were included in that list.

A DSLR version of this camera, the Nikon D780, providing similar auto focus performance and video performance, was released in January 2020.

Its successor, the Z6II, was released on 5 November 2020, and the Z6 was discontinued on September 9, 2022.

Nikon Z6 logo

== Reception ==
The preliminary review by Imaging-Resource in the U.S. offered this summary of its conclusion after preliminary testing had been completed: "Overall, the Nikon Z6 is shaping up to be a very nice, all-around, enthusiast-grade mirrorless camera. ... I'm having a hard time finding any sizable criticism for the Z6. The image quality is fantastic, ... and the build quality is superb. The camera ... was easy to pick up and operate without much, if any, confusion. ... The camera feels great, works great and produces great photographs. I honestly can't ask for much more." The only negative comment at that time was that the Z6 offers only a single XQD card slot; such cards were still quite expensive at the time and a single slot does not provide any "backup security".

Digital Photography Review rated the camera's sensor as providing excellent resolution and high ISO performance, "though on rare occasions you may see banding if shadow areas are brightened ... While fine detail isn't as well preserved at low ISO or at high ISO as the best of its peers, the Z6 generally strikes a nice balance between noise and detail. Low light Raw performance is competitive with the best of its peers, which is to say it's essentially class-leading." The editors suggested that the Z6 may be preferable to the Z7 for some photo enthusiasts. "While the Nikon Z7 may garner the most attention, the cheaper Z6 may actually prove the more impactful of the two cameras, since it'll be within reach of a larger number of photographers. And, since it captures oversampled video without a crop, it might be a more logical choice for video shooters than the higher-resolution Z7."

One other criticism about the Z6 is its autofocus system being inferior to that of Canon and Sony's offerings, as well as its DSLR predecessors, such as the Nikon D750.

== Update history ==
Nikon has released a number of firmware updates for the Z6. The Z6 and Z7 have - so far - always received largely identical changes and share the same firmware version numbers. Some reviews of these cameras have been updated to reflect new autofocus features and improved autofocus performance over time.

Version	Release date	Notes
1.0	2018-11-23	Initial firmware version
2.0	2019-05-15	Added eye-detection autofocus in stills mode; Added auto-exposure tracking to 12 fps high-speed extended mode
2.20	2019-12-17	Added support for CFexpress memory cards; Added option for paid (200 USD) 12-bit ProRes RAW external recording upgrade
3.0	2020-02-17	Added animal (dogs and cats) eye-detection autofocus in stills mode; Added animal face-detection autofocus in movie mode; Improved subject tracking autofocus
3.10	2020-07-21	Added support for updating the firmware of F-mount lenses through the FTZ; Added support for remote control of external recorders using the Atomos protocol
3.20	2020-12-17	Added support for Blackmagic RAW recording to Blackmagic Design external video recorders on cameras with the RAW upgrade installed; The ISO sensitivity of movies recorded in ProRes RAW can now be altered in Final Cut Pro X
3.30	2021-04-25	Added voice memo feature; Added focus recall on wakeup option (restores last focus position instead of returning focus to infinity)
3.40	2021-11-10	Improved eye-detection autofocus; Added support for new lenses (24-120/4S, 28-75/2.8, 400/2.8S TC VR) and the FTZ II
3.50	2022-10-20	Customizable control assignment for focus position recall; Improved focus position recall
3.60	2023-07-12	Added support for MC-N10 remote grip
3.70	2024-07-16	Changed the default values for the following settings displayed when connecting wirelessly: Encryption keys; The password displayed after the camera's default settings are restored; Fixed an issue that would cause some buttons on the camera and MC-N10 to stop responding when the MC-N10 shutter-release button was used to start or end movie recording
3.80	2025-05-13	Fixed an issue regarding incorrect Exif data being recorded when using shutter settings "bulb" or "time"

== Video capabilities ==
The Z6 can internally record a range of 1080p and 4K video formats. External recorders can be connected via a HDMI type C connector. The Z6 always provides a "clean-feed" output without any on-screen displays in video mode.

Resolution	Frame rate	Bit depth	Recording mode	Available picture profiles	Sensor area	Sampling mode
1920x1080	24/25/30 fps	8-bit	Internal and external	Picture profiles incl. "flat" profile	FX; DX	Downsampling ?
1920x1080	50/60 fps	8-bit	Internal and external	Picture profiles incl. "flat" profile	FX; DX	Pixel binning ?
1920x1080	100/120 fps	8-bit	Internal	Picture profiles incl. "flat" profile	FX	Pixel binning and downsampling
3840x2160	24/25/30 fps	8-bit	Internal and external	Picture profiles incl. "flat" profile	FX; DX	Downsampling ?
1920x1080	24/50/30 fps	10-bit	External	Picture profiles incl. "flat" profile N-Log	FX; DX	Downsampling ?
1920x1080	50/60 fps	10-bit	External	Picture profiles incl. "flat" profile N-Log	FX; DX	Pixel binning and downsampling ?
3840x2160	24/50/30 fps	10-bit	External	Picture profiles incl. "flat" profile N-Log	FX; DX	Downsampling ?
3840x2160	24/25/30 fps	12-bit	External	ProRes RAW (requires raw video upgrade)	FX; DX	Pixel skipping
1920x1080	24/25/30/50/60 fps	12-bit	External	ProRes RAW (requires raw video upgrade)	FX; DX	Pixel skipping

== Gallery ==
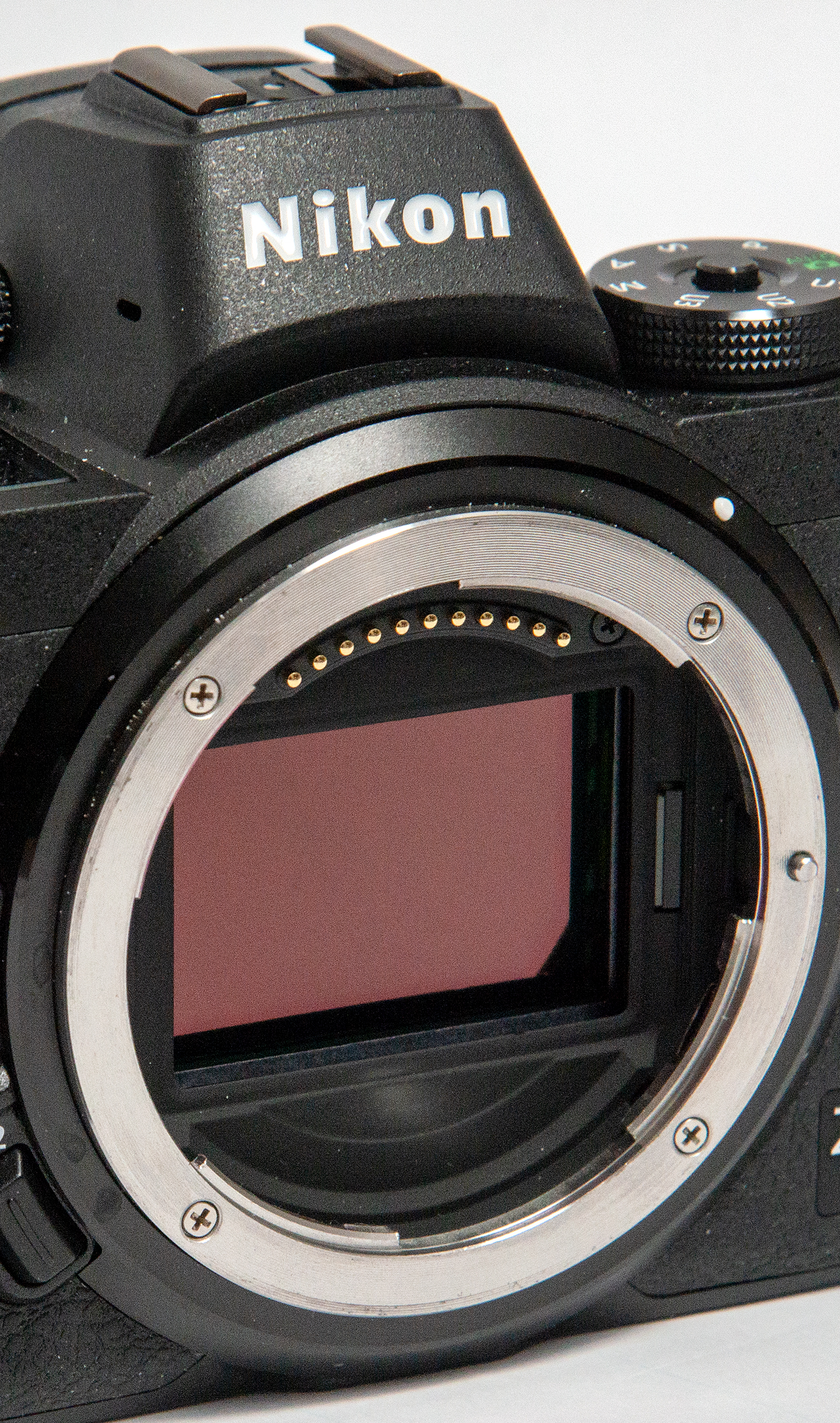

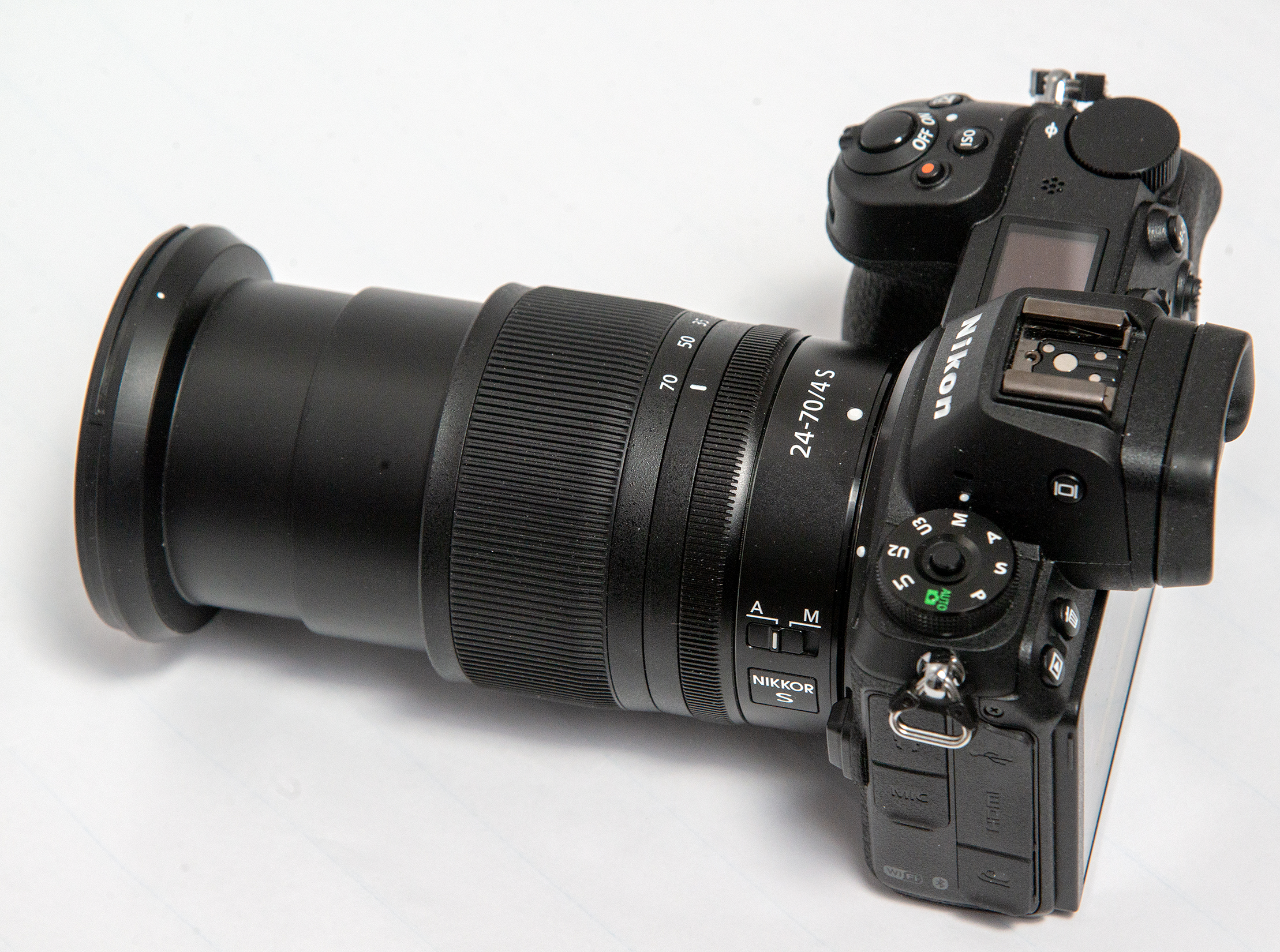

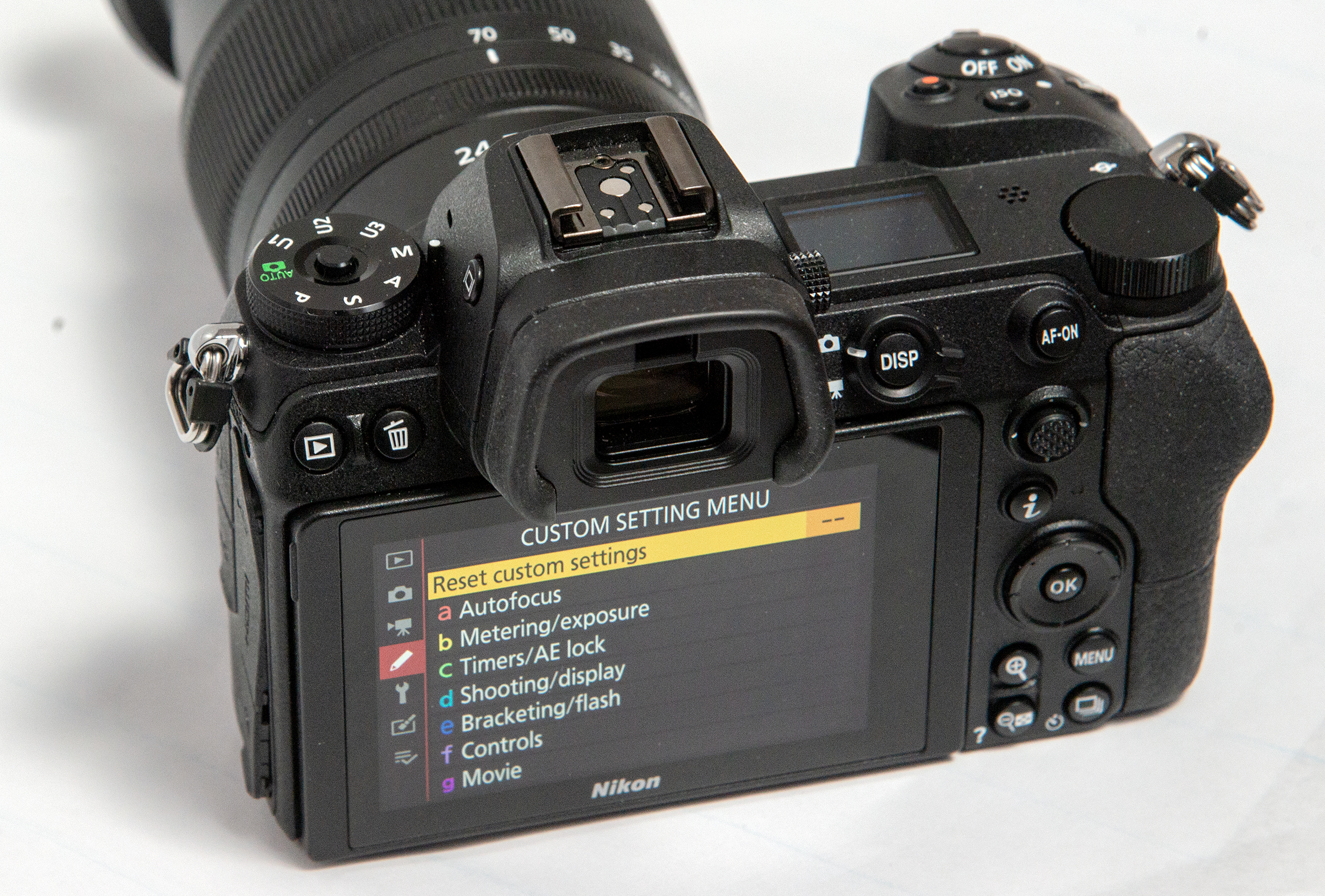

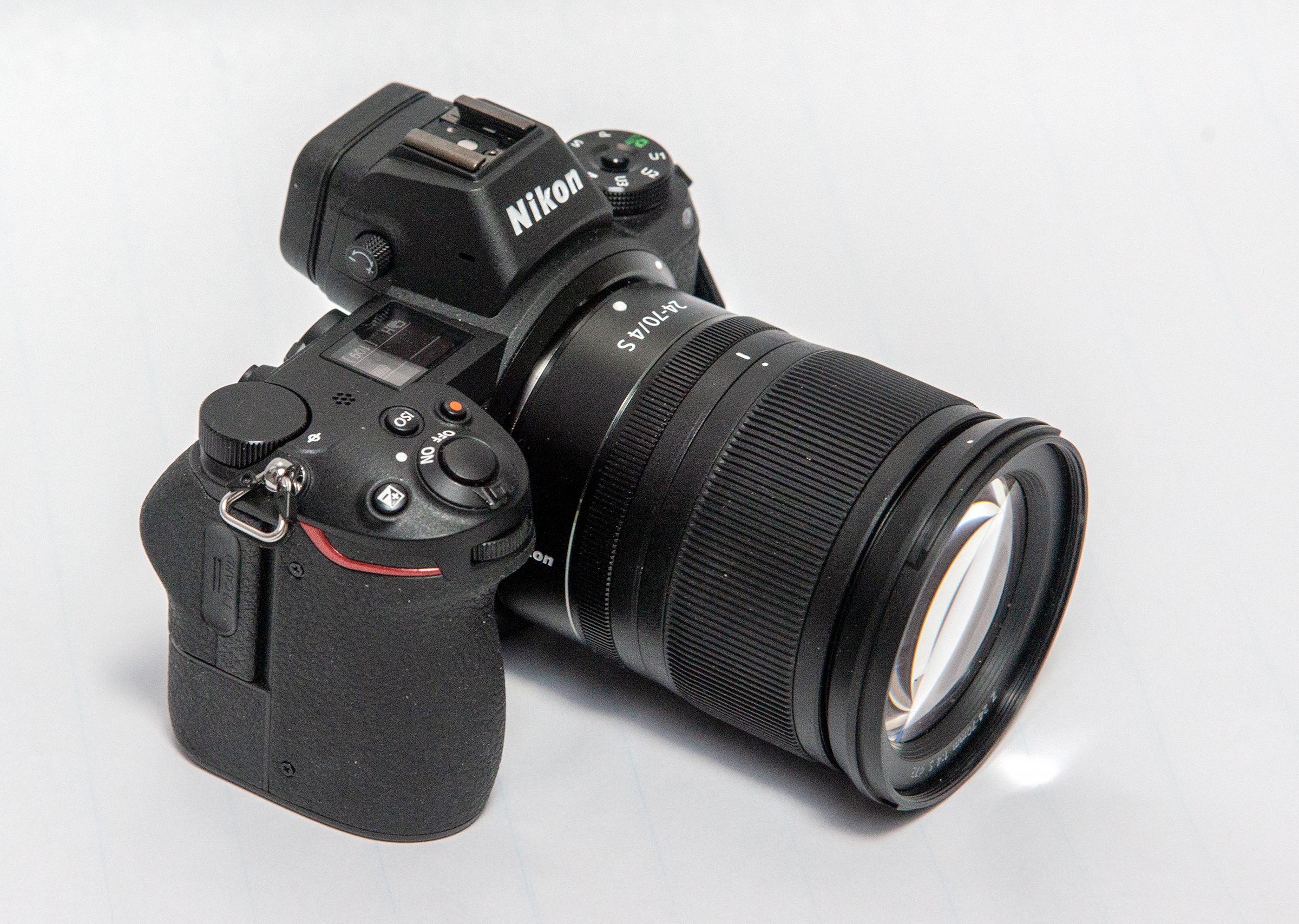

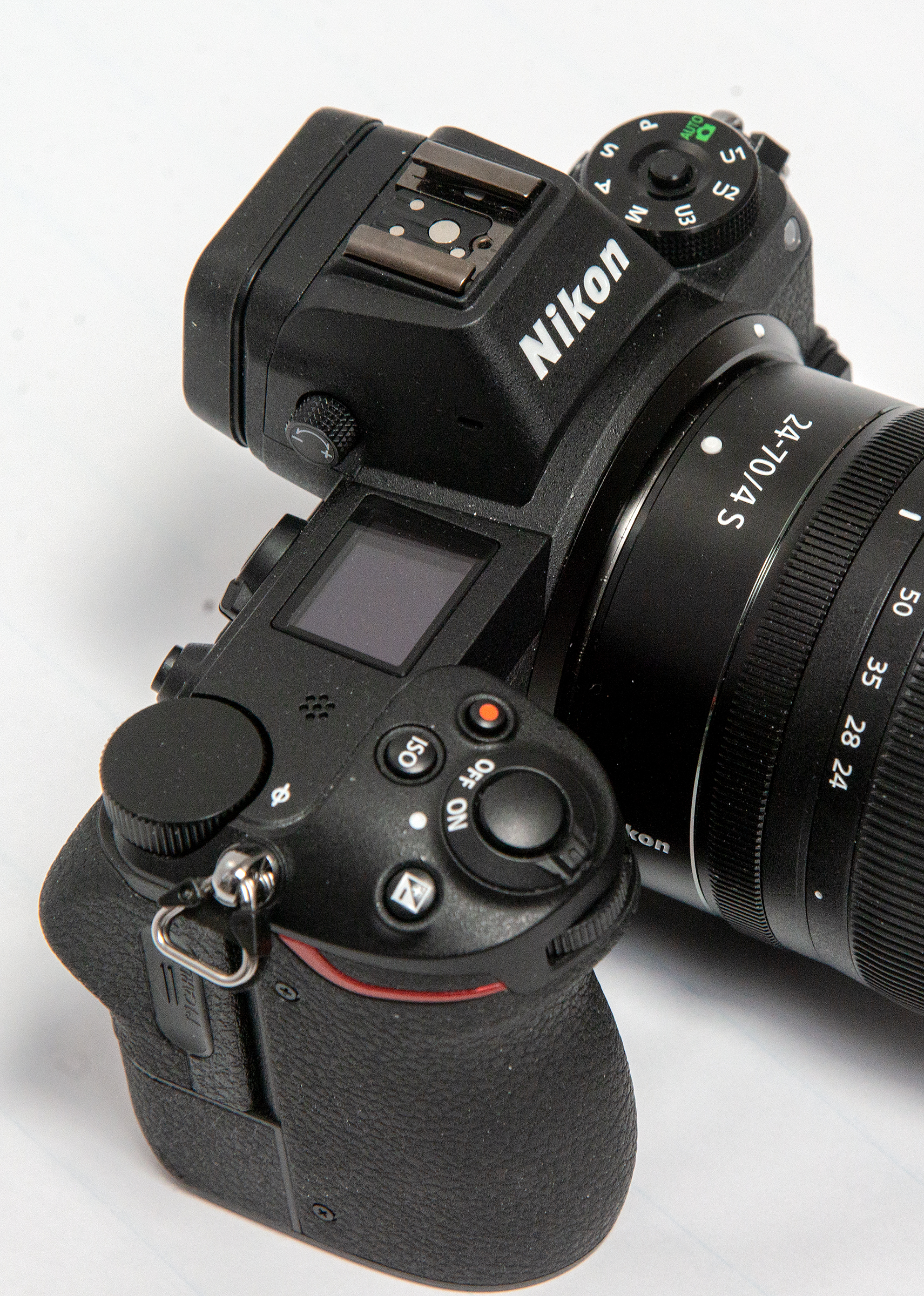

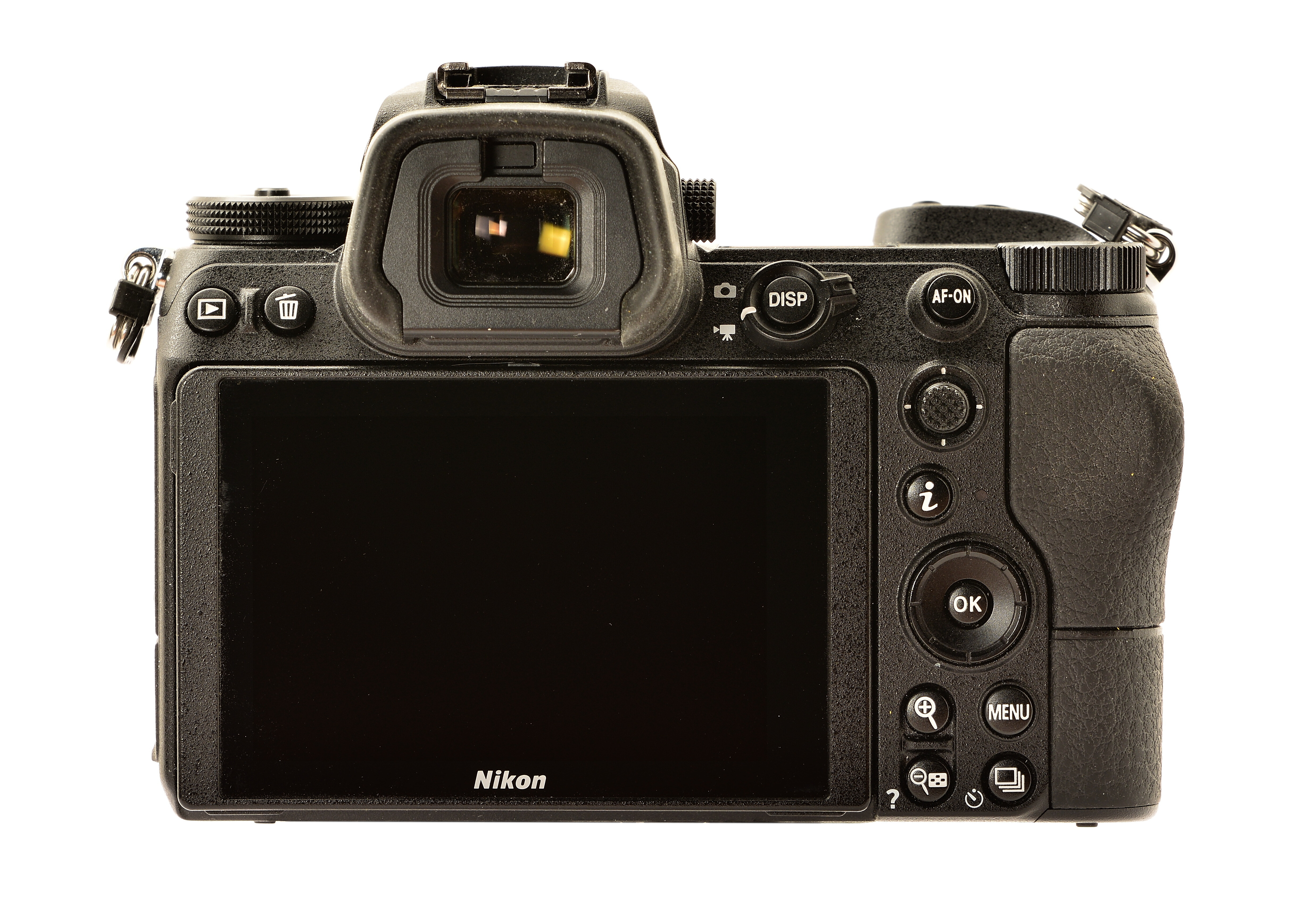

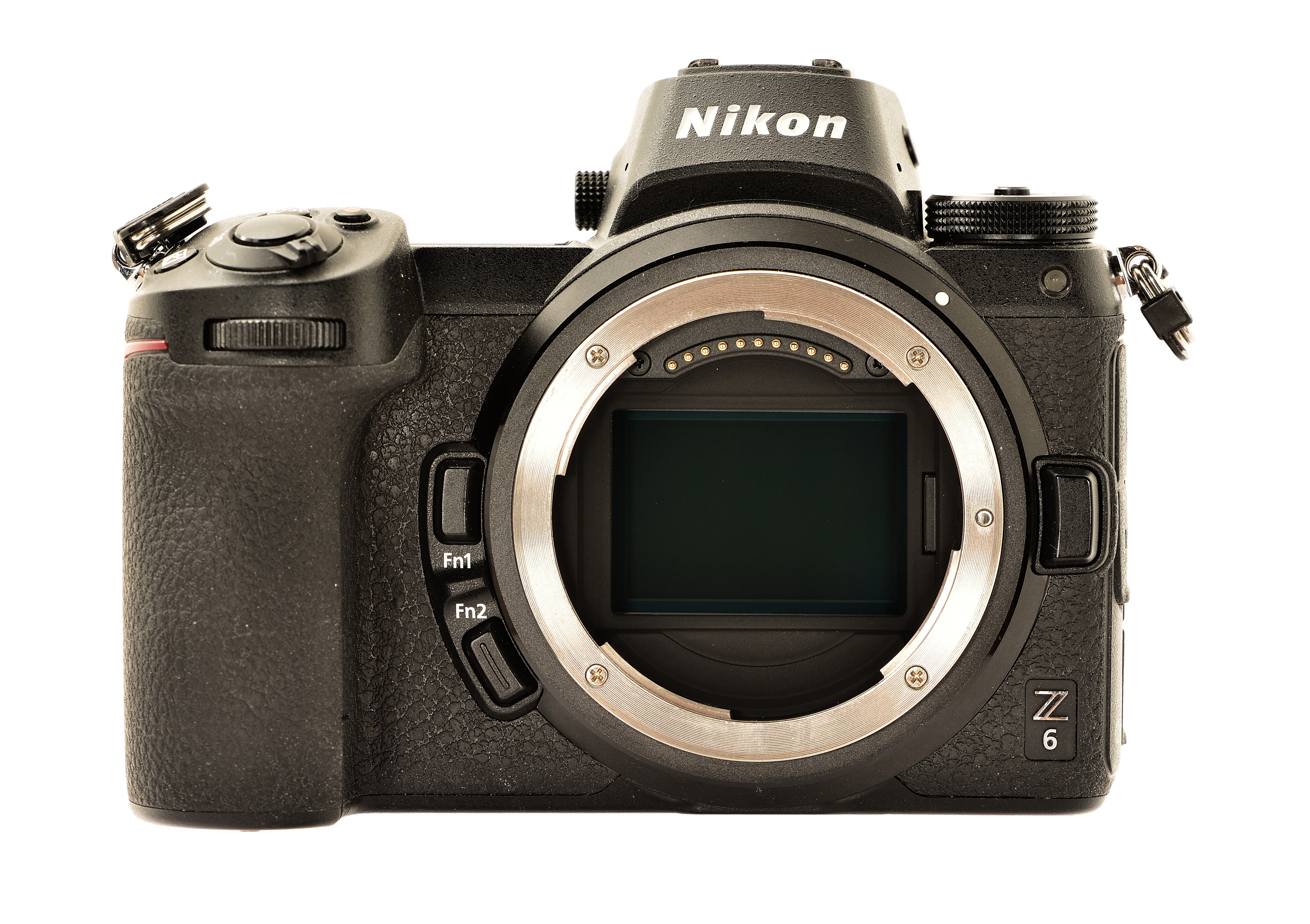

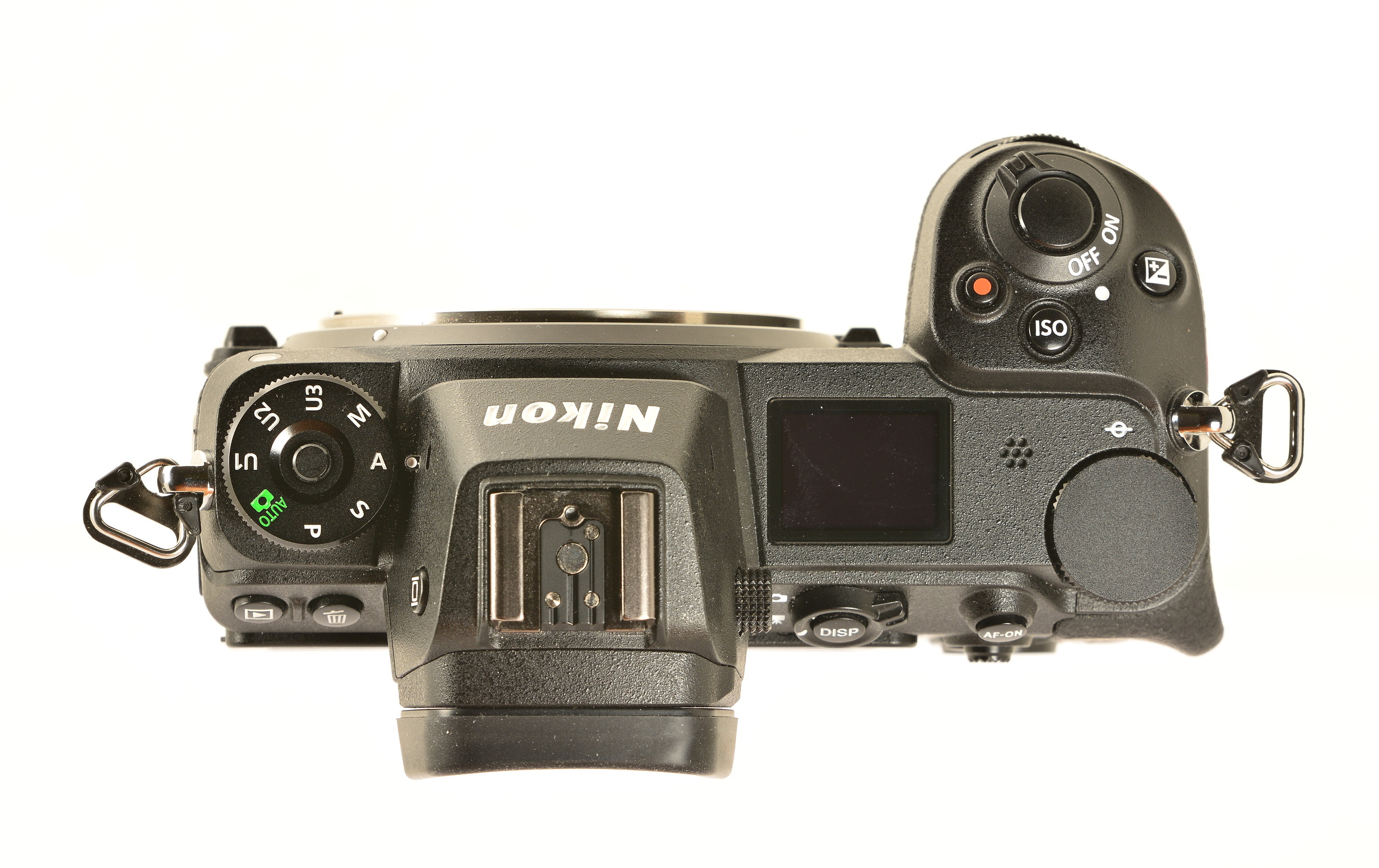

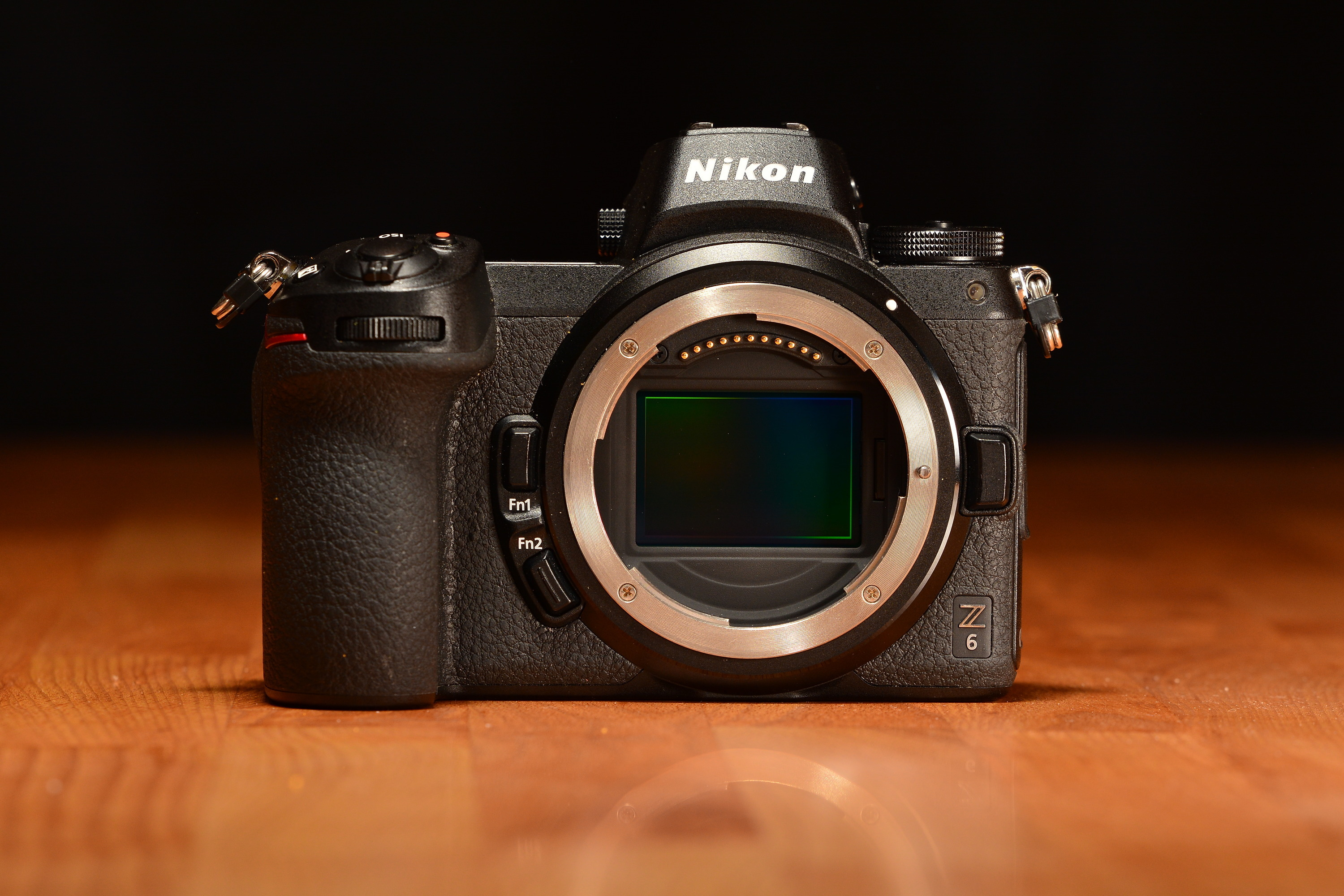

Sensor	Class	2018	2019	2020	2021	2022	2023	2024	2025	2026
FX (Full-frame)	Flagship					^{8K} Z9 ^{S}				
FX (Full-frame)	Flagship							^{8K} Z8 ^{S}		
FX (Full-frame)	Professional		^{4K} Z7 ^{S}		^{4K} Z7Ⅱ ^{S}					
FX (Full-frame)	Professional		^{4K} Z6 ^{S}		^{4K} Z6Ⅱ ^{S}				^{6K} Z6Ⅲ ^{S}	
FX (Full-frame)	Cinema									^{6K} ZR ^{S}
FX (Full-frame)	Enthusiast							^{4K} Zf ^{S}		
FX (Full-frame)	Enthusiast				^{4K} Z5 ^{S}					^{4K} Z5Ⅱ ^{S}
FX (Full-frame)	Entry-level									^{4K} Z5ⅡC ^{S}
DX (APS-C)	Enthusiast					^{4K} Zfc				
DX (APS-C)	Prosumer			^{4K} Z50					^{4K} Z50Ⅱ	
DX (APS-C)	Entry-level						^{4K} Z30			
Sensor	Class									
Sensor	Class	2018	2019	2020	2021	2022	2023	2024	2025	2026
