= Z12 small nucleolar RNA =

Small nucleolar RNA SNORD104
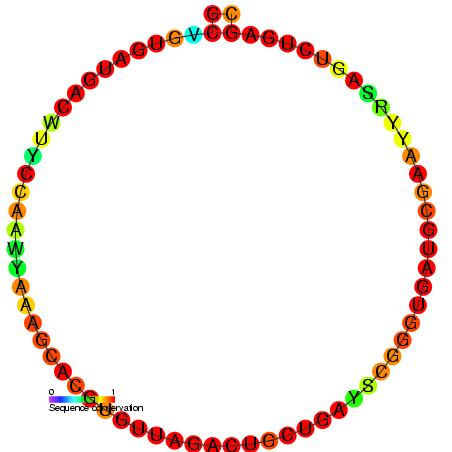
- Predicted secondary structure and sequence conservation of SNORND104

Identifiers
- Symbol: SNORND104
- Alt. Symbols: snoZ12; Z12
- Rfam: RF00289

Other data
- RNA type: Gene; snRNA; snoRNA; CD-box
- Domain: Eukaryota
- GO: GO:0006396 GO:0005730
- SO: SO:0001263
- Locus: Chr. 13
- PDB structures: PDBe

In molecular biology, Z12 small nucleolar RNA is a non-coding RNA (ncRNA) molecule which functions in the modification of other small nuclear RNAs (snRNAs). This type of modifying RNA is usually located in the nucleolus of the eukaryotic cell which is a major site of snRNA biogenesis. It is known as a small nucleolar RNA (snoRNA) and also often referred to as a guide RNA. Z12 snoRNA belongs to the C/D box class of snoRNAs which contain the conserved sequence motifs known as the C box (UGAUGA) and the D box (CUGA). Most of the members of the box C/D family function in directing site-specific 2'-O-methylation of substrate RNAs.
