= Nikon Z6II =

Full-frame mirrorless interchangeable-lens camera

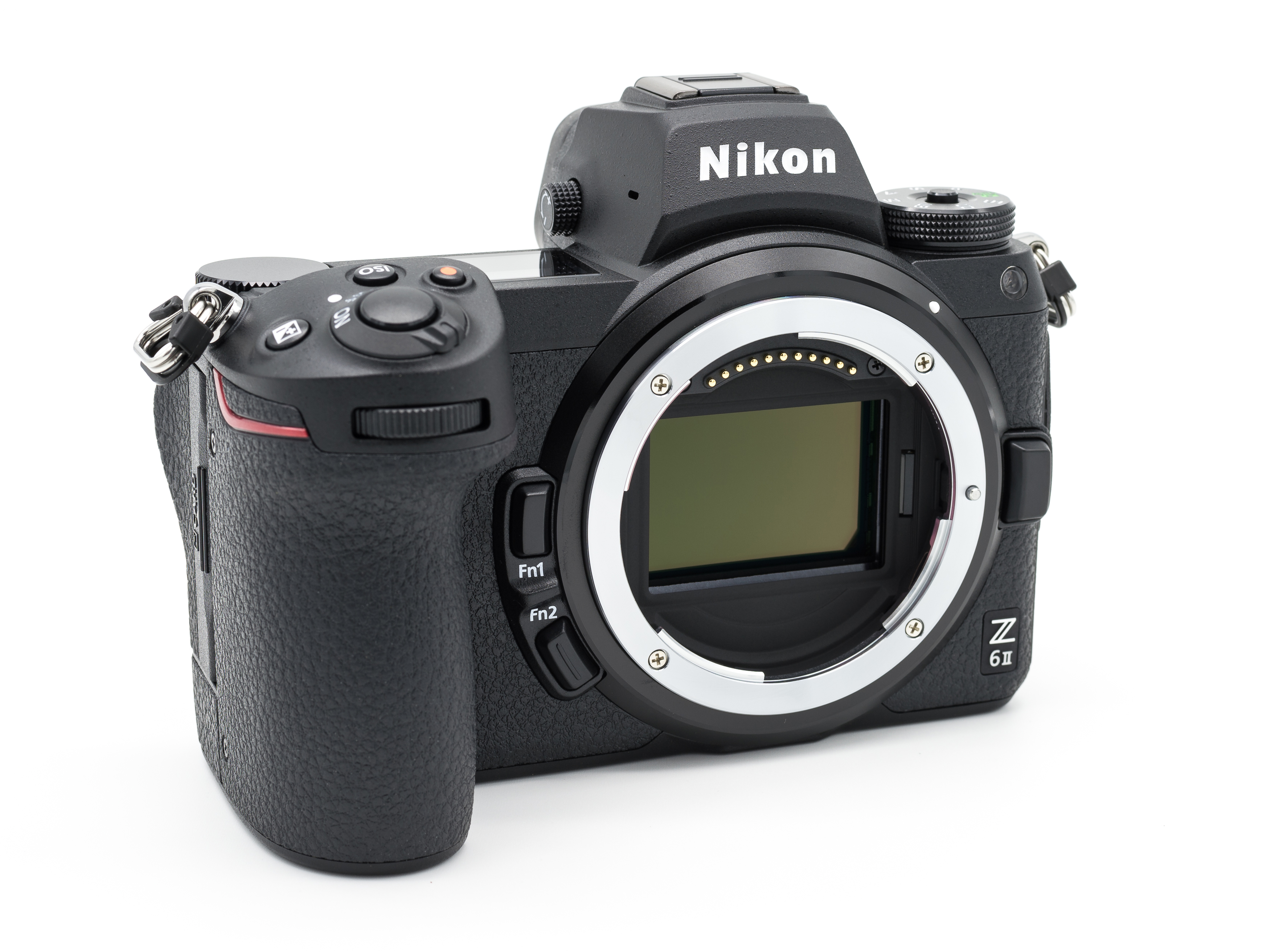

Overview
- Maker: Nikon
- Type: Full-frame mirrorless interchangeable-lens camera
- Released: 5 November 2020; 5 years ago
- Intro price: USD $1,999.95

Lens
- Lens mount: Nikon Z-mount

Sensor/medium
- Sensor type: Back-illuminated CMOS sensor
- Sensor size: Full frame (35.9 × 23.9 mm)
- Sensor maker: Sony
- Maximum resolution: 6048 × 4024 (24.5 effective megapixels)
- Film speed: Native range of ISO 100–51,200 (expandable to 50–204,800)
- Recording medium: 1 × CFexpress Type B / XQD, 1 × SD (UHS-II)

Focusing
- Focus: Single-servo AF (AF-S); Continuous-servo AF (AF-C); Full-time AF (AF-F; only available in video mode); Predictive focus tracking; Manual focus (electronic rangefinder can be used)
- Focus modes: Pinpoint; Single-point; Dynamic-area AF; Wide-area AF (small); Wide-area AF (large); Wide-area AF (Large people); Wide-area AF (Large animals); Auto-area AF; Auto-area AF (people); Auto-area AF (animals)
- Focus areas: 273 points (single-point AF) with 90% coverage

Exposure/metering
- Exposure: TTL metering using camera image sensor
- Exposure modes: Programmed Auto [P] with flexible program; Shutter-Priority Auto [S]; Aperture-Priority Auto [A]; Manual [M]
- Exposure metering: TTL metering using camera image sensor; Highlight-weighted metering: −4 to +17 EV (ISO 100, f/2.0 lens, 20 °C/68 °F)
- Metering modes: Matrix metering; Center-weighted metering; Spot metering

Flash
- Flash: Built-in: No; Hot shoe

Shutter
- Frame rate: Up to 14 fps in 12-bit RAW and single-point autofocus
- Shutter: Electronically controlled vertical-travel focal-plane mechanical shutter; Electronic front-curtain shutter
- Shutter speeds: 30s – 1/8000s

Viewfinder
- Viewfinder: Quad-VGA (1280 × 960) EVF (3690000 dots)

Image processing
- Image processor: Dual Expeed 6
- White balance: Auto (3 types); Custom; Cloudy; Direct sunlight; Flash; Fluorescent (7 types); Incandescent; Natural light auto; Preset manual (up to 6 values can be stored, all with fine-tuning); Shade

General
- Video recording: 1080p video at up to 120 fps, and 4K video at up to 60 fps
- LCD screen: 3.2-inch tilting TFT LCD with 2.1 million dots with touchscreen
- Battery: EN-EL15c
- Optional accessories: MB-N14 battery grip MB-N11 battery grip MB-N10 battery grip (no controls); MC-N10 remote grip (fw. 1.50+)
- AV port(s): USB Type-C, HDMI Type-C
- Data port(s): IEEE 802.11b/g/n/a/ac/Wi-Fi, Bluetooth Low Energy
- Body features: In-Body Image Stabilization
- Dimensions: 134×101×70 mm (5.3×4.0×2.8 in)
- Weight: 615 g (body only)
- Latest firmware: 1.70 / 3 June 2025; 15 months ago
- Made in: Thailand

Chronology
- Replaced: Nikon Z6
- Successor: Nikon Zf; Nikon Z6III

The Nikon Z6II is a full-frame mirrorless interchangeable-lens camera produced by Nikon and is the successor to the Nikon Z6. The camera was officially announced on October 14, 2020 alongside the Nikon Z7II, and became available for purchase on November 5.

== Features ==
The most notable upgrade over the Nikon Z6 is the inclusion of a second memory card slot. The Z6II added an SD card (UHS-II) slot alongside the CFexpress/XQD card slot. The camera features dual EXPEED 6 image processing engines, a first for Nikon cameras. This improves autofocus performance and enables 4K video recording at 60 fps. The frame rate for photos was increased from 12 fps to 14 fps with a larger memory buffer, but 14 fps can only be used in 12-bit RAW and single-point autofocus. The autofocus system has been vastly improved with more advanced eye detection. Lastly, in video recording, the camera can now record 4K "Ultra HD" footage at 60p in DX-crop mode.

The Z6II features the same back-illuminated full-frame 24.5-megapixel CMOS sensor as the Z6.

== See also ==
- Nikon Z-mount
- Nikon Z6
- Nikon Z6III
- Nikon Z7
- Nikon Z7II

Sensor	Class	2018	2019	2020	2021	2022	2023	2024	2025	2026
FX (Full-frame)	Flagship					^{8K} Z9 ^{S}				
FX (Full-frame)	Flagship							^{8K} Z8 ^{S}		
FX (Full-frame)	Professional		^{4K} Z7 ^{S}		^{4K} Z7Ⅱ ^{S}					
FX (Full-frame)	Professional		^{4K} Z6 ^{S}		^{4K} Z6Ⅱ ^{S}				^{6K} Z6Ⅲ ^{S}	
FX (Full-frame)	Cinema									^{6K} ZR ^{S}
FX (Full-frame)	Enthusiast							^{4K} Zf ^{S}		
FX (Full-frame)	Enthusiast				^{4K} Z5 ^{S}					^{4K} Z5Ⅱ ^{S}
DX (APS-C)	Enthusiast					^{4K} Zfc				
DX (APS-C)	Prosumer			^{4K} Z50					^{4K} Z50Ⅱ	
DX (APS-C)	Entry-level						^{4K} Z30			
Sensor	Class									
Sensor	Class	2018	2019	2020	2021	2022	2023	2024	2025	2026
