= German submarine U-74 =

U-74 may refer to one of the following German submarines:

- SM U-74, a Type UE I submarine launched in 1915 and that served in World War I until sunk 17 May 1916
  - During World War I, Germany also had these submarines with similar names:
    - SM UB-74, a Type UB III submarine launched in 1917 and sunk on 26 May 1918
    - SM UC-74, a Type UC II submarine launched in 1916 and interned at Barcelona on 21 November 1918; surrendered on 26 March 1919; broken up at Toulon in July 1921
- German submarine U-74, a Type VIIB submarine that served in World War II until sunk on 2 May 1942
