= Z5 =

Z5 may refer to:

- Harbin Z-5, Chinese helicopter
- Mazda Z engine
- a file extension used by Z-machine
- Z5 (computer) designed by Konrad Zuse
- the GMG Airlines IATA airline code
- German destroyer Z5 Paul Jacobi
- the Beijing-Nanning-Hanoi Through Train (southbound)
- Zbrojovka Z5 Express, a Czech car of the 1930s
- LNER Class Z5, a class of British steam locomotives
- Nikon Z5, a full-frame mirrorless camera produced by Nikon
  - Nikon Z5II, a reworked model of the previous
    - Nikon Z5IIC, a variant model of the previous

== See also ==
- 5Z (disambiguation)
