= Nikon ZR =

2025 full-frame compact cinema camera

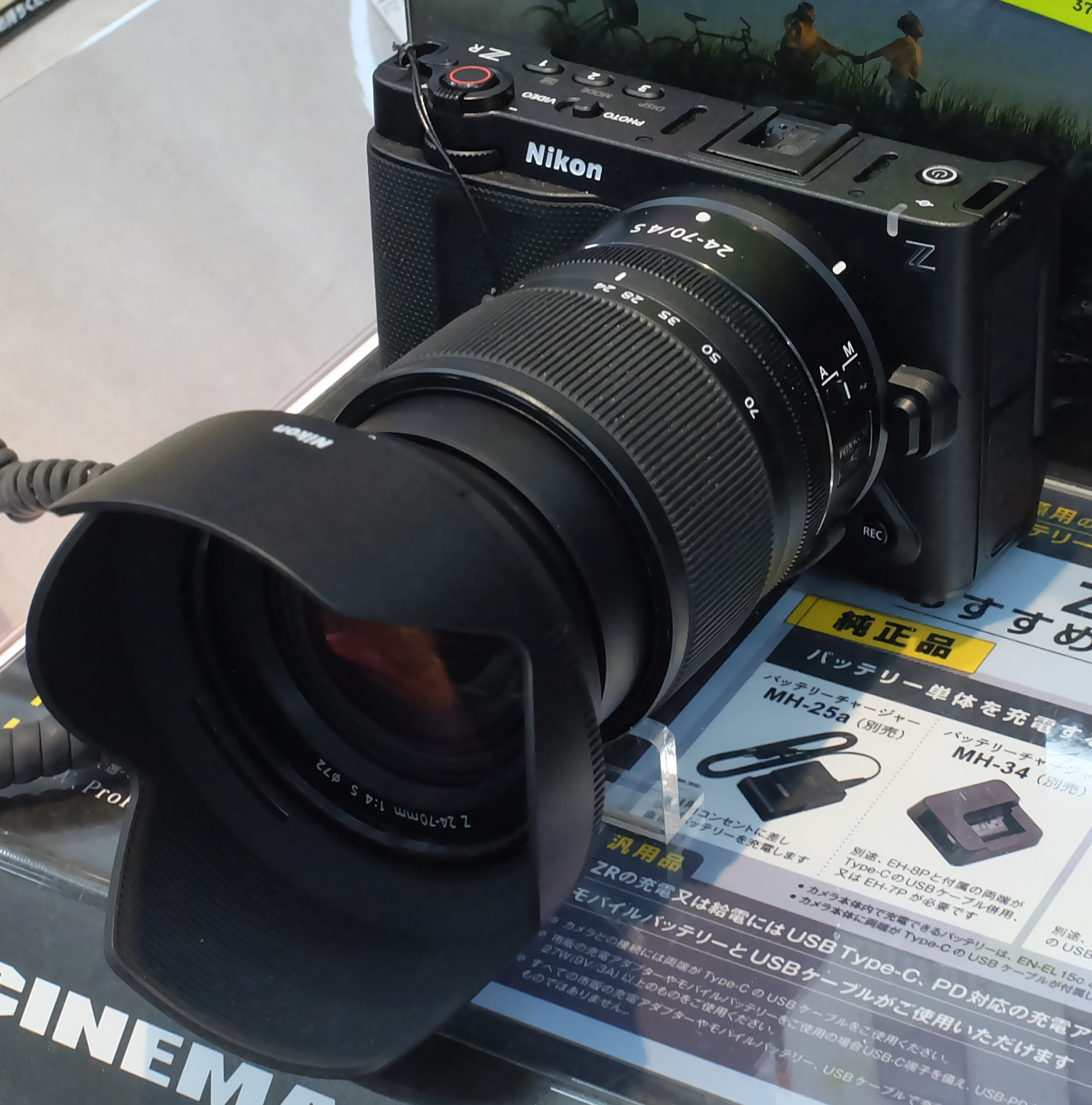
- Nikon ZR + Nikkor Z 24–70mm f/4 S

Overview
- Maker: Nikon
- Type: Full-frame digital cinema camera
- Released: 24 October 2025; 12 months ago
- Intro price: US$2,199 / ¥299,200 (body only)

Lens
- Lens: Nikon Z-mount

Sensor/medium
- Sensor type: CMOS
- Sensor size: 35.9 mm × 23.9 mm (full frame); Nikon FX format
- Sensor maker: Sony Semiconductor Solutions Group
- Maximum resolution: 6,048 × 3,402 (24.5 effective megapixels)
- Film speed: Native range of ISO 100-51,200 (expandable to 204,800); When recording R3D NE: dual native ISO of 800 and 6400
- Recording medium: 1 × CFexpress Type B / XQD; 1 × microSD (UHS-I)

Shutter
- Shutter: Electronic
- Shutter speeds: 900s – 1/16000s

Viewfinder
- Viewfinder: None

Image processing
- Image processor: Expeed 7

General
- LCD screen: 4.0-inch fully articulating LCD with 3.07M dots with touchscreen, 1000 nits brightness, DCI-P3 color space
- Battery: EN-EL15c (backwards compatible with EN-EL15a/b batteries); USB-PD rechargeable
- Optional accessories: ME-D10 shotgun microphone
- AV ports: USB-C; HDMI Type-D (micro); 3.5 mm stereo microphone jack; 3.5 mm stereo headphone jack
- Data ports: Digital hotshoe; IEEE 802.11b/g/n/a/ac Wi-Fi; Bluetooth 5.0 Low Energy
- Body features: In-Body Image Stabilization
- Dimensions: 134 mm × 80.5 mm × 49 mm (5.28 in × 3.17 in × 1.93 in)
- Weight: Approx. 540 g (1.19 lb) (body only)
- Latest firmware: 1.11 / 17 March 2026; 7 months ago
- Made in: Thailand

The Nikon ZR is a full-frame digital cinema camera announced by Nikon on 10 September 2025. It is the company’s first model co-developed with RED Digital Cinema, following Nikon’s acquisition of RED in 2024. The ZR is part of Nikon’s new Z-Cinema series and was released in late October 2025, as the eleventh full-frame Z-mount body and the fifteenth Z-mount camera body.

== Development and announcement ==
The ZR was introduced as Nikon’s first dedicated cinema camera and the first to incorporate RED’s color science and codec technology. It is also the first camera to use the R3D NE codec, a variant of REDCODE RAW developed jointly by Nikon and RED that leverages intoPIX TicoRAW compression. Because of this shared TicoRAW compression, some workflows treat N‑RAW (.NEV) and R3D NE files in a similar manner – for example, by renaming .NEV files to .R3D so that compatible software can decode them via the RED SDK.

The name ZR comes from the combination of the “Z” from Nikon’s mirrorless brand name Z-system and the “R” from RED.

== Design and features ==
The ZR employs a 24.5-megapixel full frame partially stacked CMOS sensor and the Expeed 7 image processor, both the same as the Nikon Z6III. It records internally in multiple formats including Nikon N-RAW, ProRes RAW, ProRes 422 HQ, H.265, H.264, and the new R3D NE codec. Supported frame rates include 6K at 60p, 4K at 120p, and 1080p at 240p. Dynamic range is rated at more than 15 stops, with dual base ISOs of 800 and 6400.

The camera body weighs 540 g (630 g with battery and media) and measures 133 mm × 80.5 mm × 48 mm. It has no electronic viewfinder, instead providing a fully articulating 4.0-inch (100 mm) LCD touchscreen with 3.07 million dots and brightness of 1,000 nits. The screen uses the DCI-P3 color space. The camera can apply 3D LUT files (.CUBE) for viewing footage on the screen while filming.

Other features include a 5-axis in-body image stabilization system (IBIS) rated to 7.5 stops, electronic shutter only, a tally light, and 32-bit float audio recording with internal microphones using Nokia OZO processing. Connectivity includes Wi-Fi, Bluetooth, micro-HDMI, and a digital accessory shoe. Storage is provided via one CFexpress Type-B slot and one microSD (UHS-I) slot.

For vloggers, the ZR includes the Product review mode autofocus setting.

=== Image processor ===
The ZR uses the EXPEED 7 image processor, which is also used in the Nikon Z9, Z8, Zf, Z6III, Z50II, Z5II, and Z5IIC.

=== Lenses ===
The ZR uses the Nikon Z-mount, developed by Nikon for its mirrorless digital cameras.

Nikon F-mount lenses can be used, with various degrees of compatibility, via the Nikon FTZ (F-to-Z) and FTZ II mount adapters.

== Market positioning ==
The ZR has been described as an entry-level cinema camera aimed at solo creators, small productions, and as a B-camera on RED sets. It has been noted as a competitor to the Sony FX3 and Canon EOS C70.

== Gallery ==
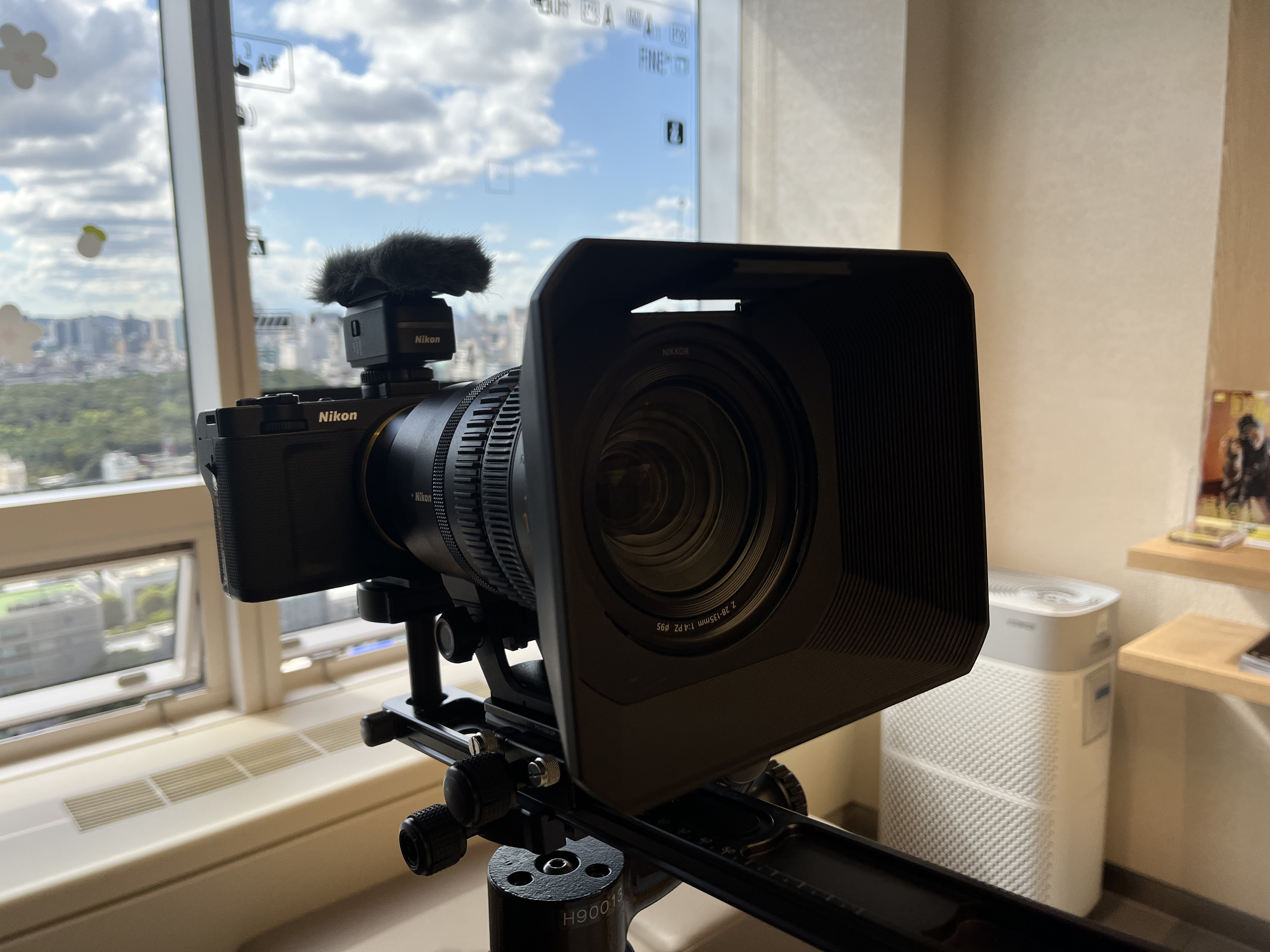
Nikon ZR + Nikkor Z 28–135mm f/4 PZ

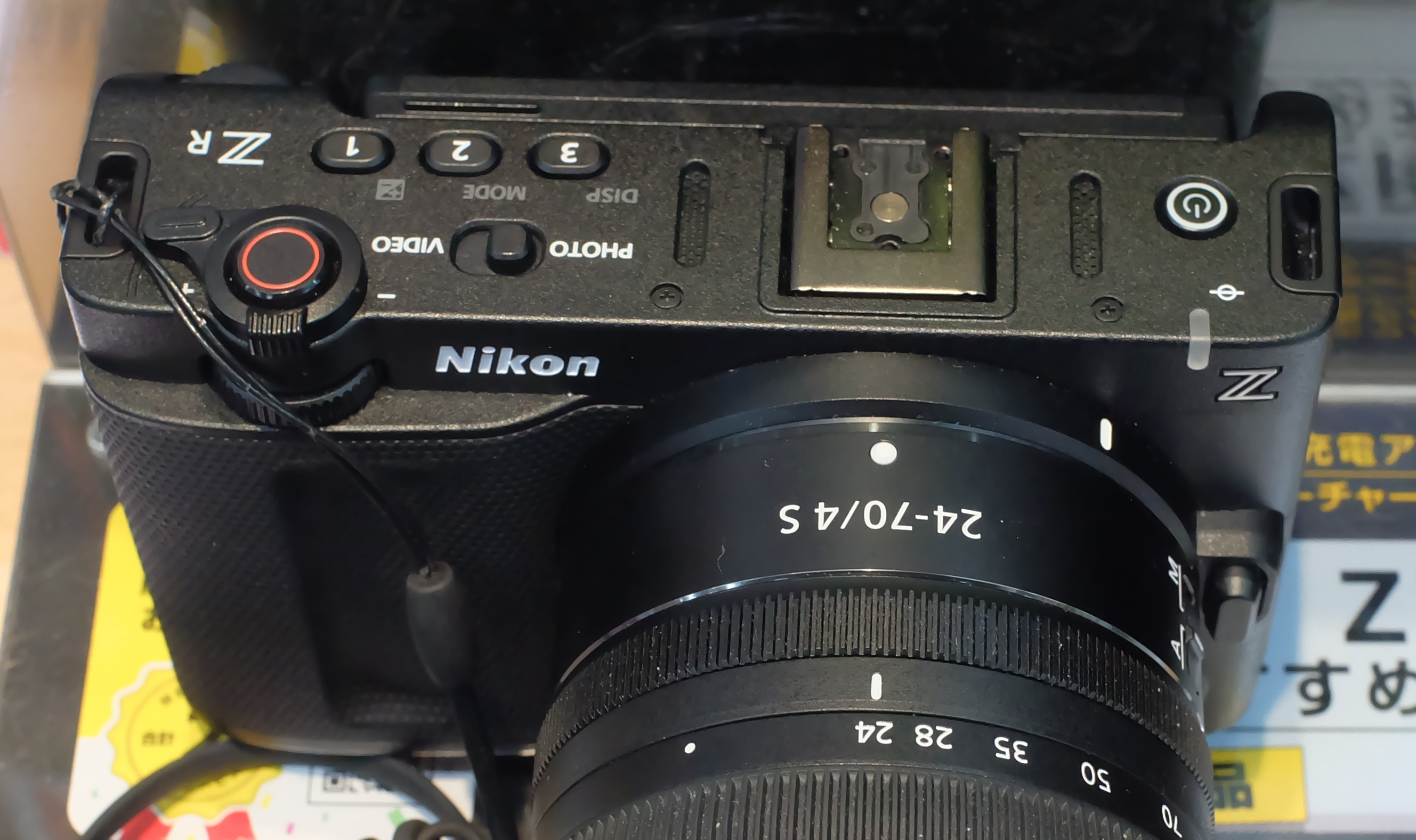

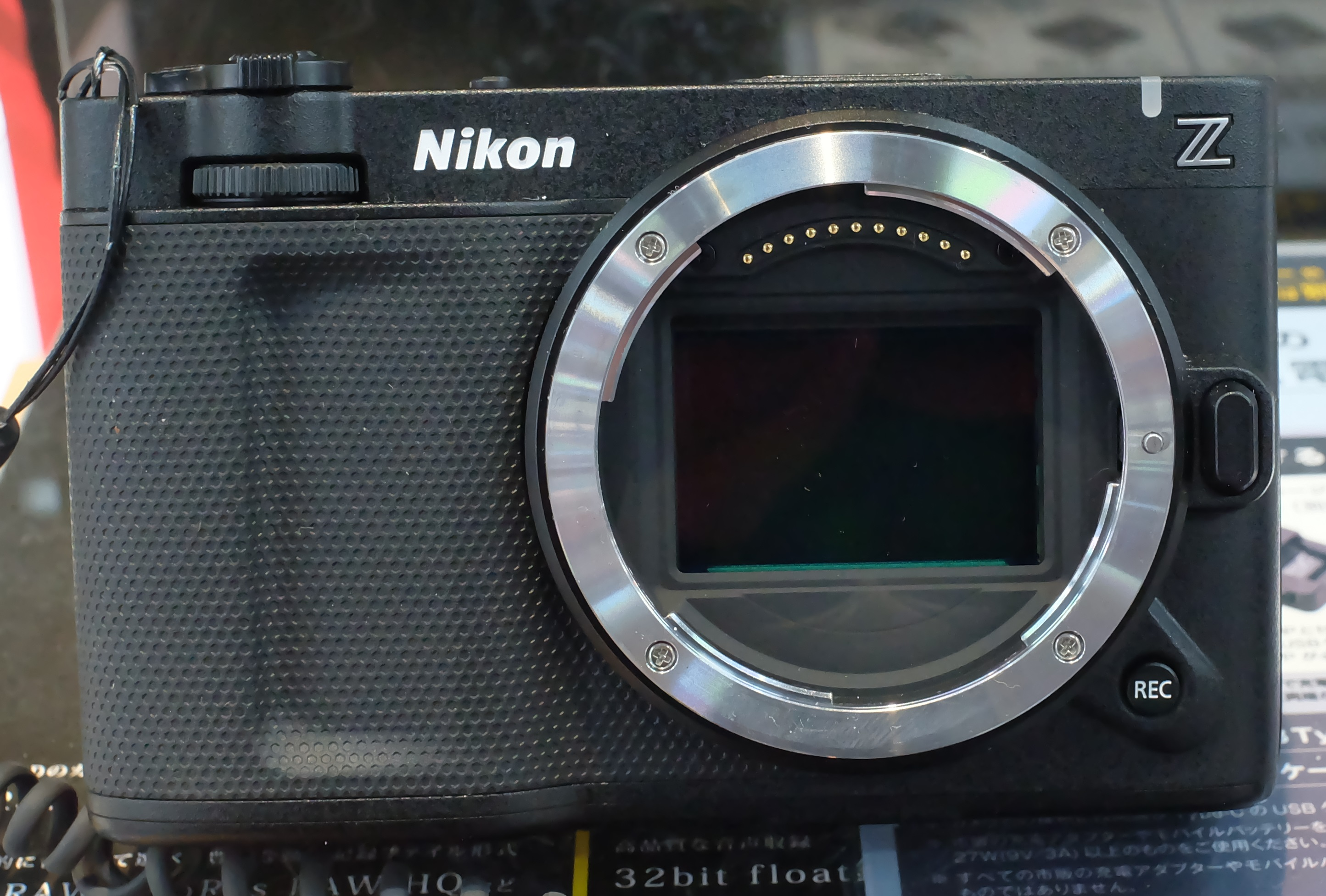

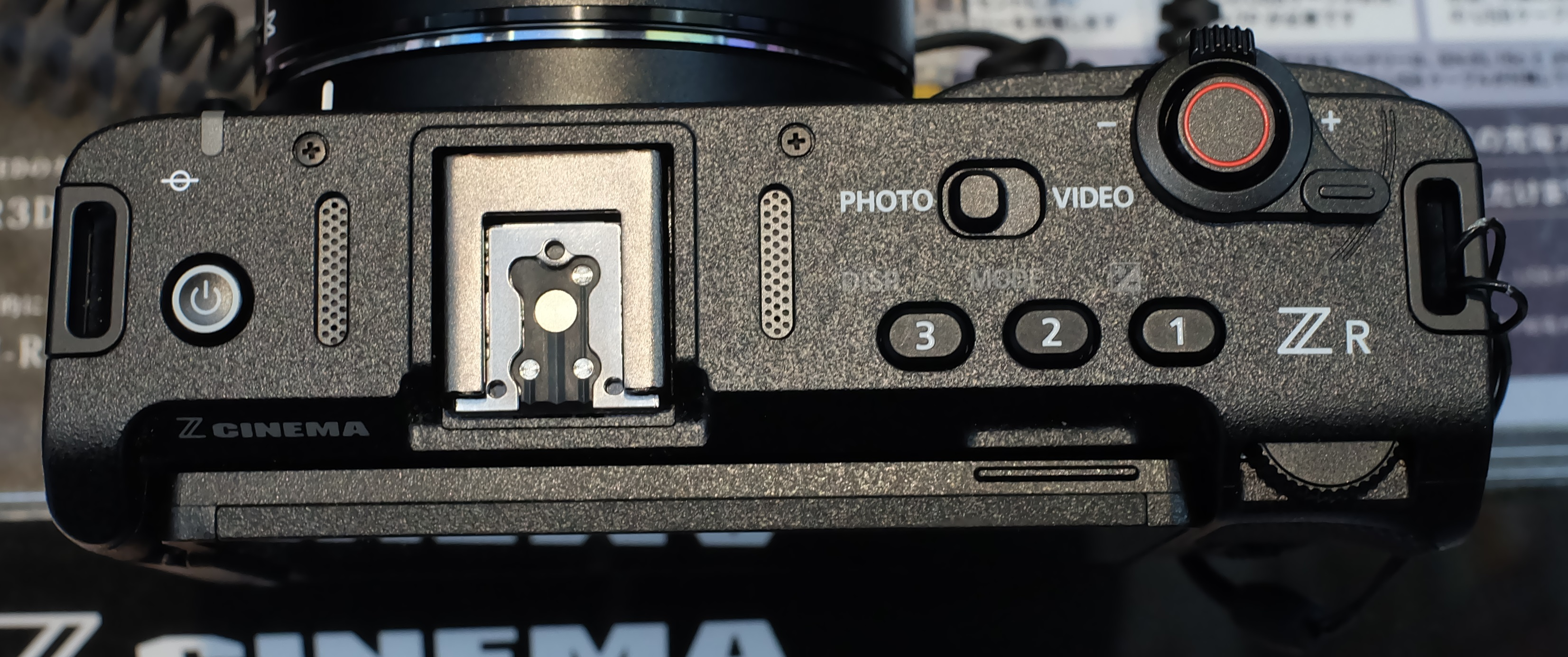

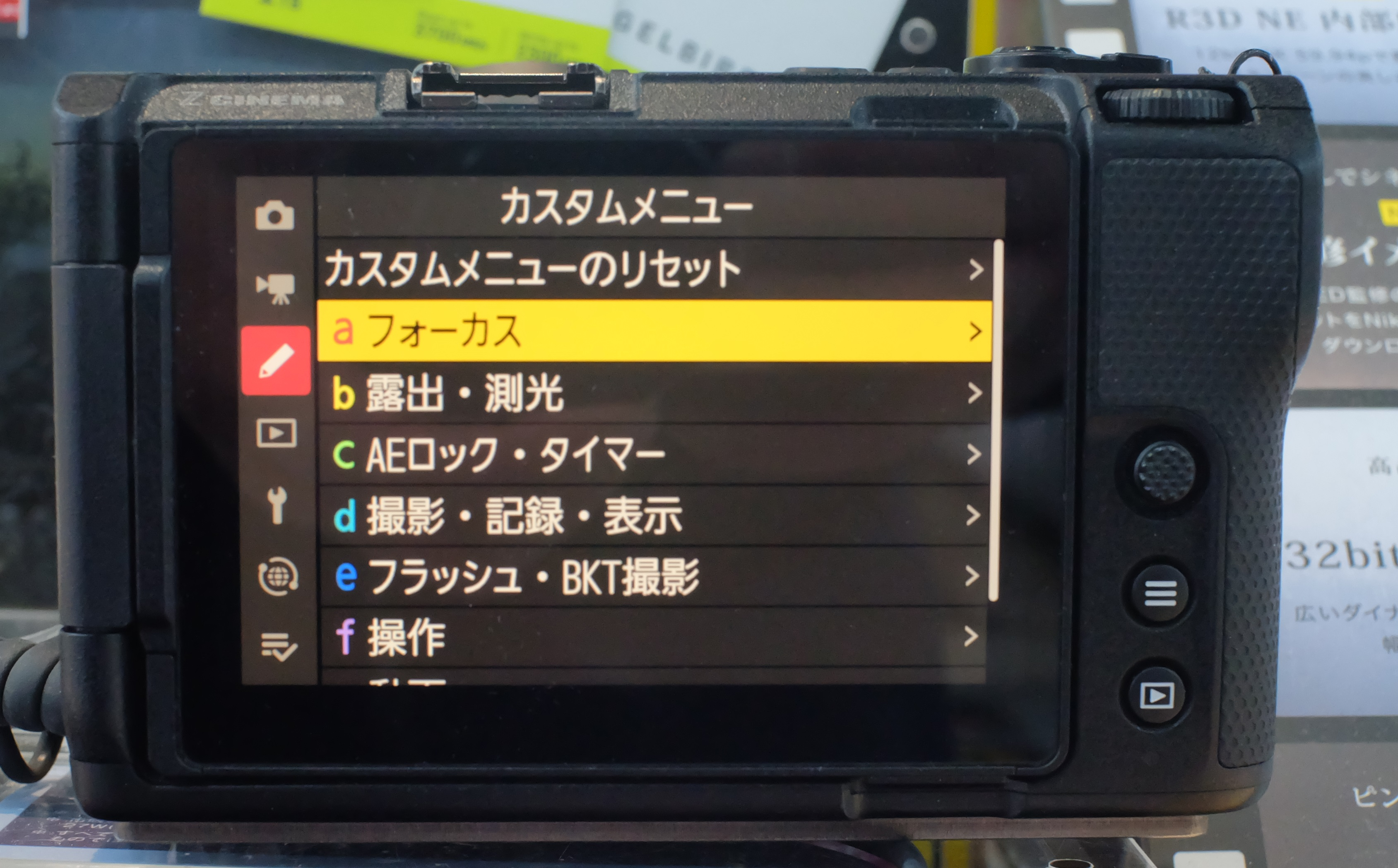

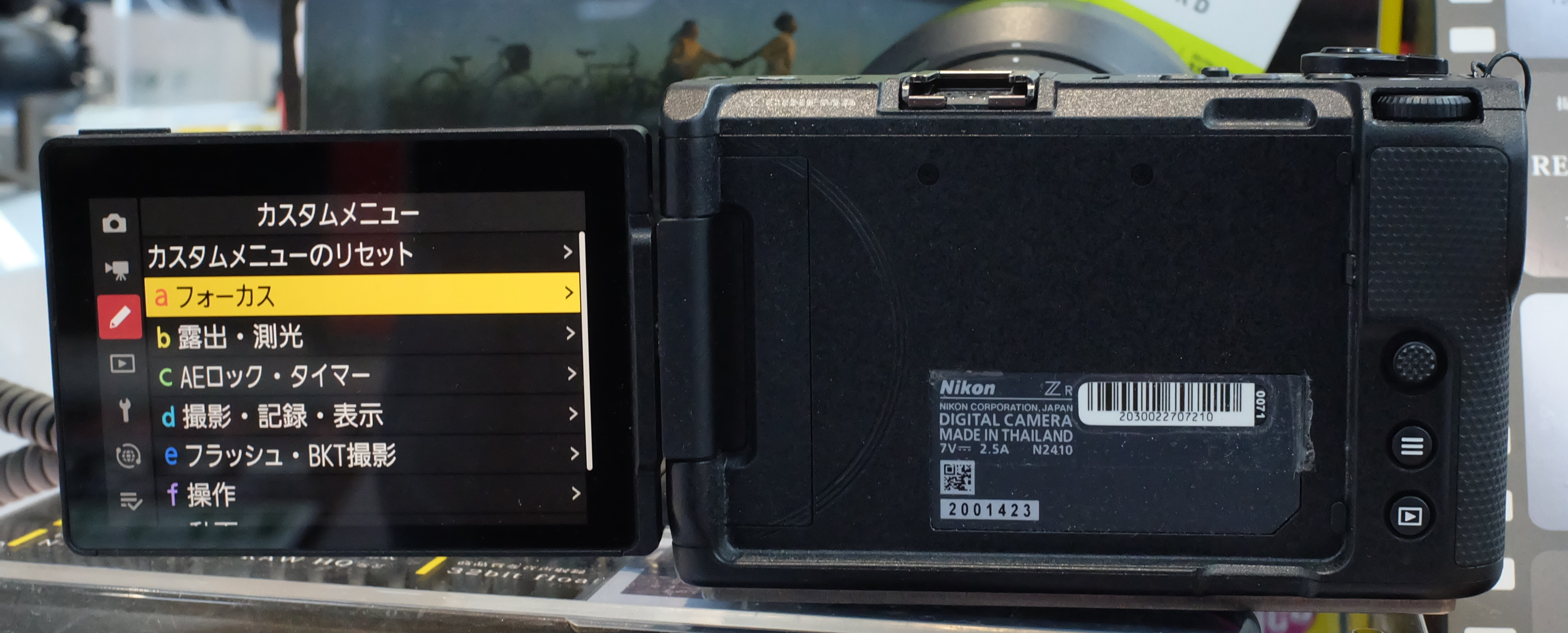

== Update history ==
FW Version	Release date	Notes
1.00	2025-10-24	Initial firmware version
1.10	2026-01-27	Video; increased length of video session from 125 to 360 minutes; in R3D, a warning added for potential loss of highlight detail; added video file naming and options; Timecode for addition of LTC signal input; in Auto, R3D can be set as the Video file type; Controls; in g15, he maximum number of files displayed to import increased to 50; Displays; in Setup, added Power-on lamp energy saver; Network; For Nikon Imaging Cloud, some of the explanatory texts displayed when connecting were modified (the connection procedure remains unchanged).; Bug fixes; during USB streaming, corrected issue where audio noise sometimes occurred
1.11	2026-03-17	Bug fixes; Corrected touch issue when in Glove mode; Corrected shutter speed changing while High-frequency flicker reduction is set when returning to S or M

== Marketing slogan ==
When the ZR was launched, Nikon used the following marketing slogans:

- English: “Born Cinematic”,

== See also ==
- Nikon Z-mount
- RED Digital Cinema
- Nikon Z6III

Sensor	Class	2018	2019	2020	2021	2022	2023	2024	2025	2026
FX (Full-frame)	Flagship					^{8K} Z9 ^{S}				
FX (Full-frame)	Flagship							^{8K} Z8 ^{S}		
FX (Full-frame)	Professional		^{4K} Z7 ^{S}		^{4K} Z7Ⅱ ^{S}					
FX (Full-frame)	Professional		^{4K} Z6 ^{S}		^{4K} Z6Ⅱ ^{S}				^{6K} Z6Ⅲ ^{S}	
FX (Full-frame)	Cinema									^{6K} ZR ^{S}
FX (Full-frame)	Enthusiast							^{4K} Zf ^{S}		
FX (Full-frame)	Enthusiast				^{4K} Z5 ^{S}					^{4K} Z5Ⅱ ^{S}
FX (Full-frame)	Entry-level									^{4K} Z5ⅡC ^{S}
DX (APS-C)	Enthusiast					^{4K} Zfc				
DX (APS-C)	Prosumer			^{4K} Z50					^{4K} Z50Ⅱ	
DX (APS-C)	Entry-level						^{4K} Z30			
Sensor	Class									
Sensor	Class	2018	2019	2020	2021	2022	2023	2024	2025	2026
