= Nikon Z6III =

2024 full-frame mirrorless camera

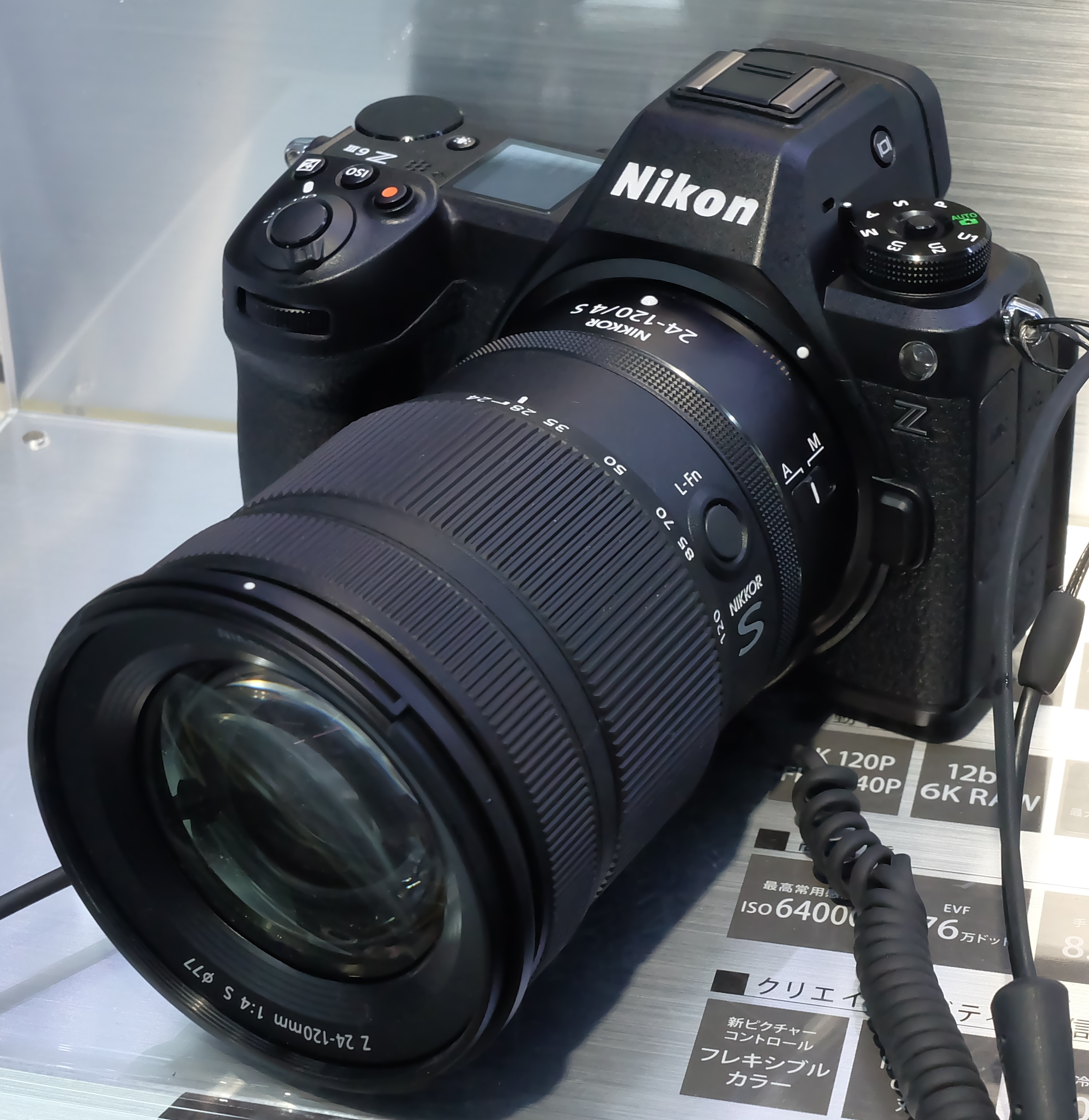
- Nikon Z6III + Nikkor Z 24-120mm f/4 S

Overview
- Maker: Nikon
- Type: Full-frame mirrorless interchangeable-lens camera
- Released: 24 June 2024; 2 years ago
- Intro price: USD $2,499.95

Lens
- Lens mount: Nikon Z-mount

Sensor/medium
- Sensor type: Partially stacked back-illuminated CMOS sensor
- Sensor size: Full frame (35.9 x 23.9 mm); Nikon FX format
- Sensor maker: Sony Semiconductor Manufacturing Corporation
- Maximum resolution: 6,048 x 4,032 (24.5 effective megapixels)
- Film speed: Native range of ISO 100-64,000 (expandable to 50-204,800)
- Recording medium: 1× CFexpress Type B / XQD, 1× SD (UHS-II)

Focusing
- Focus: Single-servo AF (AF-S); Continuous-servo AF (AF-C); Full-time AF (AF-F; only available in video mode); Predictive focus tracking Manual focus
- Focus areas: 273 focus points (single-point AF) 299 focus points (auto-area AF)

Exposure/metering
- Exposure: TTL metering using camera image sensor
- Exposure modes: Programmed Auto [P] with flexible program; Shutter-Priority Auto [S]; Aperture-Priority Auto [A]; Manual [M]
- Exposure metering: TTL metering using camera image sensor Highlight-weighted metering: -4 to +17 EV (ISO 100, f/2.0 lens, 20 °C/68 °F)
- Metering modes: Matrix metering Center-weighted metering Spot metering Highlight-weighted metering

Flash
- Flash: Built-in: No; Hot shoe
- Flash synchronization: 1/200s (up to 1/8000s using high-speed sync, up to 1/60s using electronic shutter)

Shutter
- Frame rate: Up to 120 fps in 11 MP continuous (C120), up to 60 fps (C60) at full-resolution with JPEG output, up to 30 fps (C30), up to 20 fps with RAW+JPEG output
- Shutter: Mechanical and electronic shutter
- Shutter speeds: 900s – 1/16000s
- Continuous shooting: 20fps / 30 fps / 120fps (expand)

Viewfinder
- Viewfinder: UXGA (1600x1200) EVF (5760000 dots), 0.8x magnification with 50 mm lens, 4000 nits brightness

Image processing
- Image processor: Expeed 7
- White balance: Auto (keep white, keep warm colors, keep overall atmosphere), natural light auto, direct sunlight, cloudy, shade, incandescent, fluorescent (3 types), flash, manual white point (2500K-10000K), preset manual (up to 6 values)

General
- Video recording: 6K up to 60 fps in 12-bit N-RAW and ProRes RAW HQ, 4K up to 60 fps, 4K up to 120 fps (DX crop mode), 1080p up to 240 fps (full frame)
- LCD screen: 3.2-inch fully articulated TFT LCD with 2.1 million dots with touchscreen
- Battery: EN-EL15c (backwards compatible with EN-EL15a/b batteries); USB-PD rechargeable
- Optional accessories: MB-N14 battery grip MC-N10 remote grip
- AV port(s): USB Type-C, HDMI 2.1 Type A (full size), 3.5 mm microphone jack, 3.5 mm headphone jack
- Data port(s): IEEE 802.11b/g/n/a/ac/Wi-Fi, Bluetooth Low Energy
- Body features: In-Body Image Stabilization
- Dimensions: 138×101×74 mm (5.4×4.0×2.9 in)
- Weight: 760 g (27 oz) (with battery)
- Latest firmware: 2.01 / 14 October 2026; 27 days ago
- Made in: Thailand

Chronology
- Predecessor: Nikon Z6II
- Successor: Nikon ZR

The Nikon Z6III is a mid-range full-frame mirrorless camera produced by Nikon. The camera was announced on June 17, 2024. It is the successor to the Nikon Z6II released in 2020, becoming the ninth full-frame Z-mount body and the twelfth Z-mount camera body.

== Features ==
=== Image sensor ===
The Z6III features a 24.5-megapixel, partially stacked CMOS sensor, which enables the camera to match the 120fps burst (DX format, 10MP only) capability of the Nikon Z8 and Z9 cameras with fully stacked CMOS sensors. Due to this, Z6III has the fastest readout speed in its class as of June 2024.

=== Image processor ===
The Z6III uses the EXPEED 7 image processor, which is also used in the Nikon Z9, Z8, Zf, Z50II, Z5II, and ZR.

=== Lenses ===
The Z6III uses the Nikon Z-mount, developed by Nikon for its mirrorless digital cameras.

Nikon F-mount lenses can be used, with various degrees of compatibility, via the Nikon FTZ (F-to-Z) and FTZ II mount adapters.

=== Video capability ===
For videographers, the Z6III supports 6K video recording at 60 frames per second. Additionally, it offers 4K recording at 120 frames per second and Full HD at 240 frames per second. The camera includes features such as focus peaking, zebra patterns, and customizable picture profiles to aid in achieving professional-grade video quality.

For streaming applications, the Z6III directly supports both UVC and UAC streaming using its USB-C port.

=== Autofocus and subject detection ===
The Z6III's autofocus system utilizes deep learning AI to improve subject detection and tracking. This makes it highly effective in recognizing and focusing on a variety of subjects, including faces, birds, animals, and moving objects. The eye-detection AF ensures sharp focus on human eyes, which is particularly beneficial for portrait photography. The Z6III supports pre-release capture.

With FW 2.0, added the auto-capture functionally, allowing the photographer to establish a set of criteria, with the camera automatically taking a picture(s) when those conditions are met.

=== In-body image stabilization ===
The Nikon Z6III includes a robust five-axis in-body image stabilization (IBIS) system that can reduce vibration up to 8 stops. The IBIS also uses the same Focus Point Vibration Reduction system first introduced in Nikon Zf, in which the IBIS works at the focus point of the camera rather than the center of the image like the conventional IBIS.

=== Connectivity and smart features ===
The Z6III is equipped with advanced connectivity options, including Wi-Fi and Bluetooth, facilitating seamless integration with smart devices. This allows for remote camera control and instant sharing of images over a smartphone. The camera also supports USB-C for faster data transfer and charging. Integration with Nikon's Imaging Cloud further enhances workflow efficiency by enabling easy image transfer, storage, and sharing.

=== New Picture Control feature ===
The Z6III has the Flexible Color Picture Control feature within its Picture Control, and allows users to create Picture Control profile with HSL and color grading on top of previously tweak-able Picture Control settings. The Flexible Color Picture Control, or normal Picture Control, can now be made through Nikon's NX Studio software instead of its Picture Control Utility 2.

=== C2PA image authentication ===
FW 2.0 added the ability to do C2PA image authentication. This allows for more secure identification and credibility of content using exif data, following the C2PA standards.

This was temporarily suspended on 5 Sept 2025 due to an issue.

== Nikon Z6III (No Wireless Connectivity) ==
On 24 June 2026, the Nikon Z6III Mirrorless Camera (No Wireless Connectivity) (model 2036) was announced by Nikon. It is identical in all regards to the base model, with the exception of its Wi-Fi and Bluetooth chips being physically removed. It is intended primarily for government, military, or high-security environments. As the communication chips are removed, things like wireless transfer of photos, GPS photo tagging, and the use of the Nikon SnapBridge app are all unavailable.

Primary demands for the product are for:

- compliance in secure government facilities and SCIFs.
- compliance to specific government contracts requiring no wireless connectivity
- compliance with other institutions (like law enforcement and security) and groups with policies on radio frequency usage.

== Gallery ==
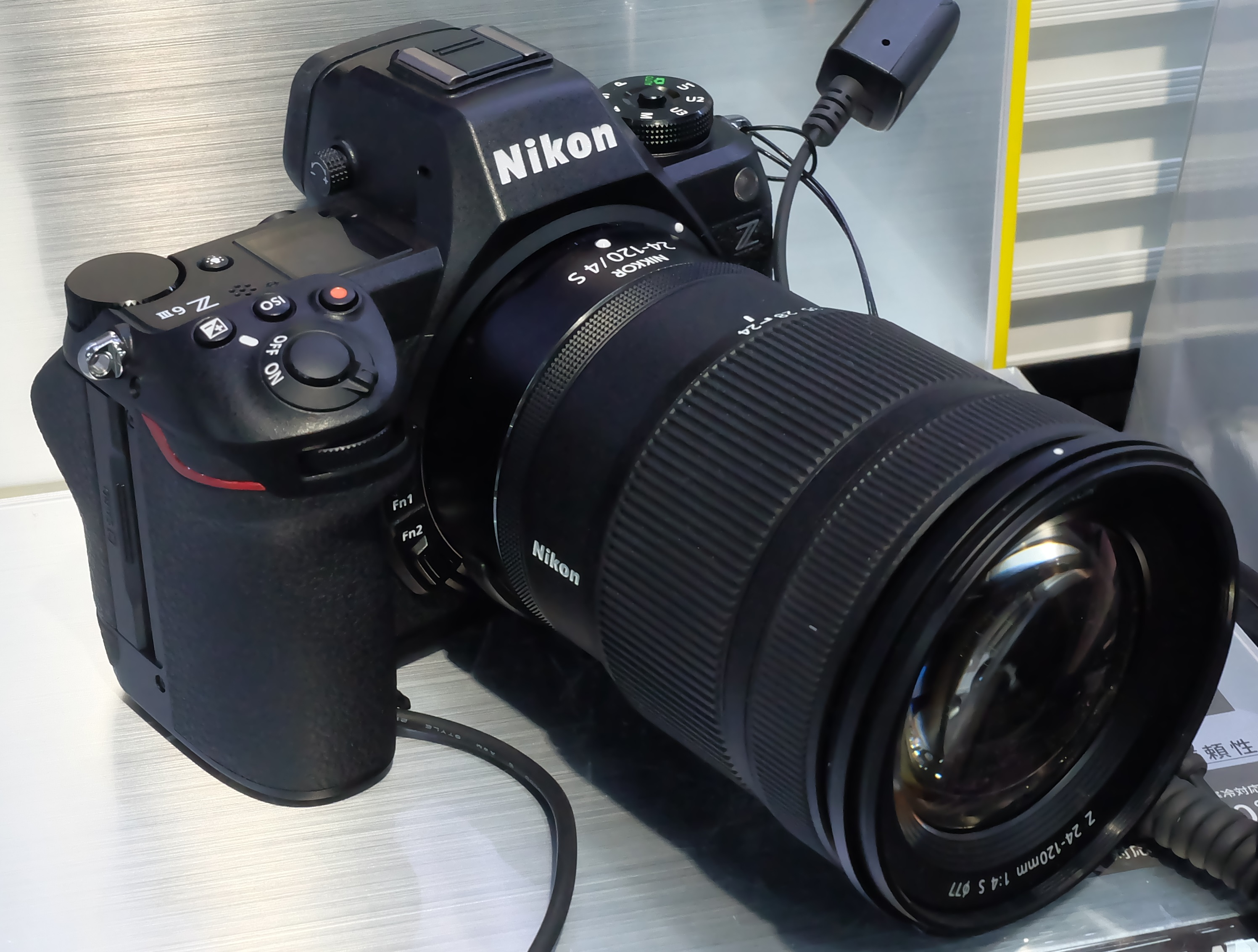
Z6III + Nikkor Z 24-120 mm f/4 S

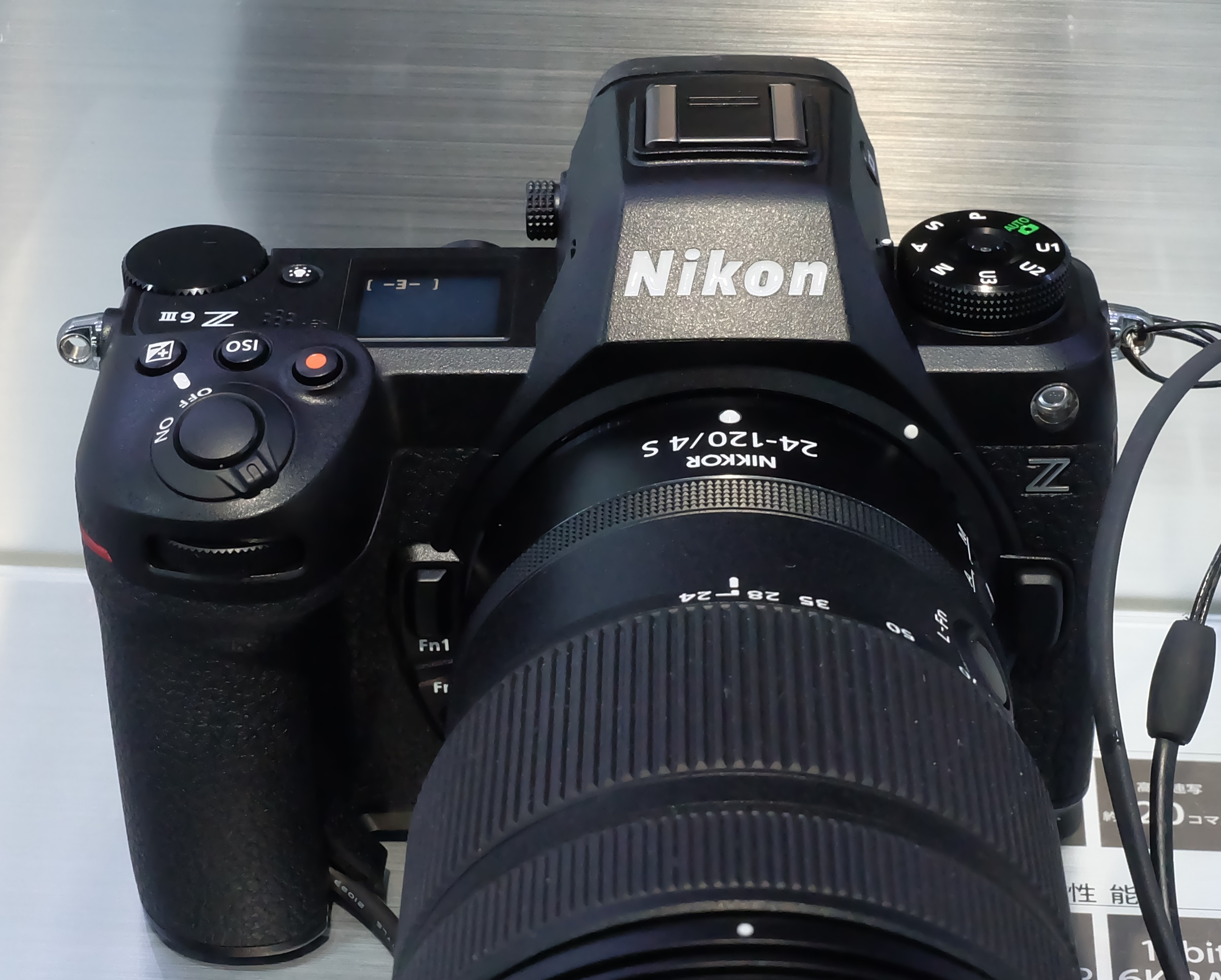

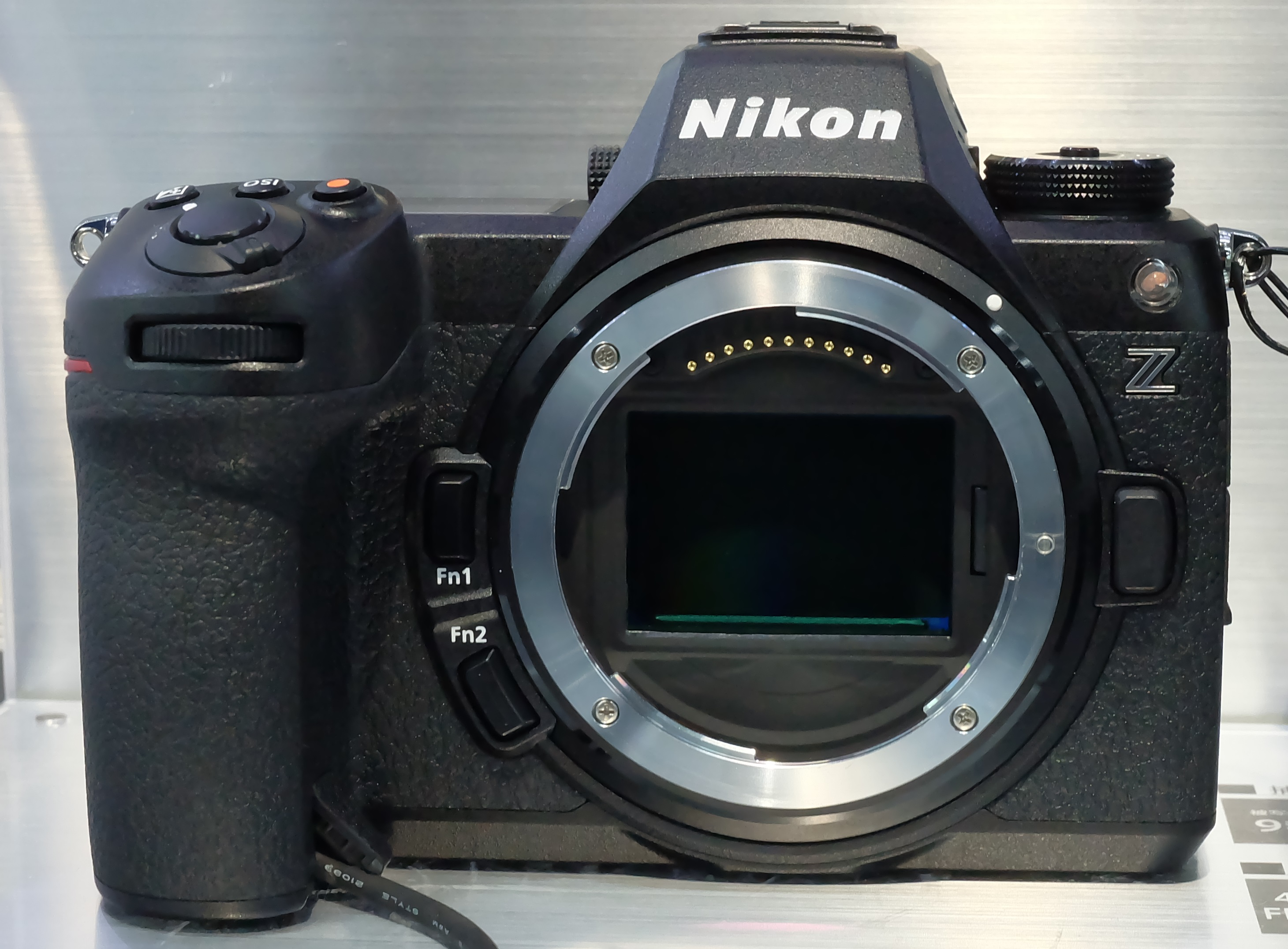

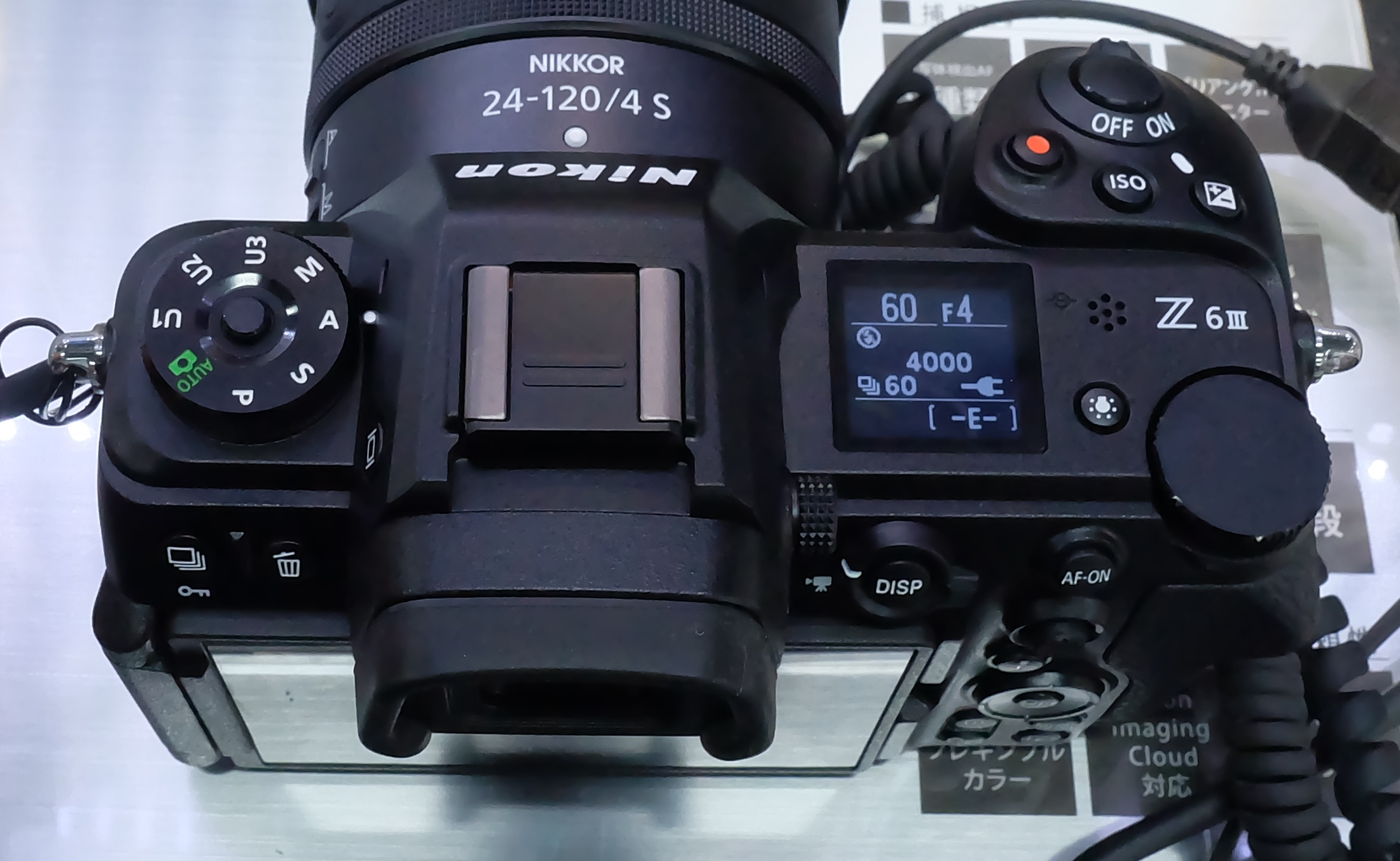

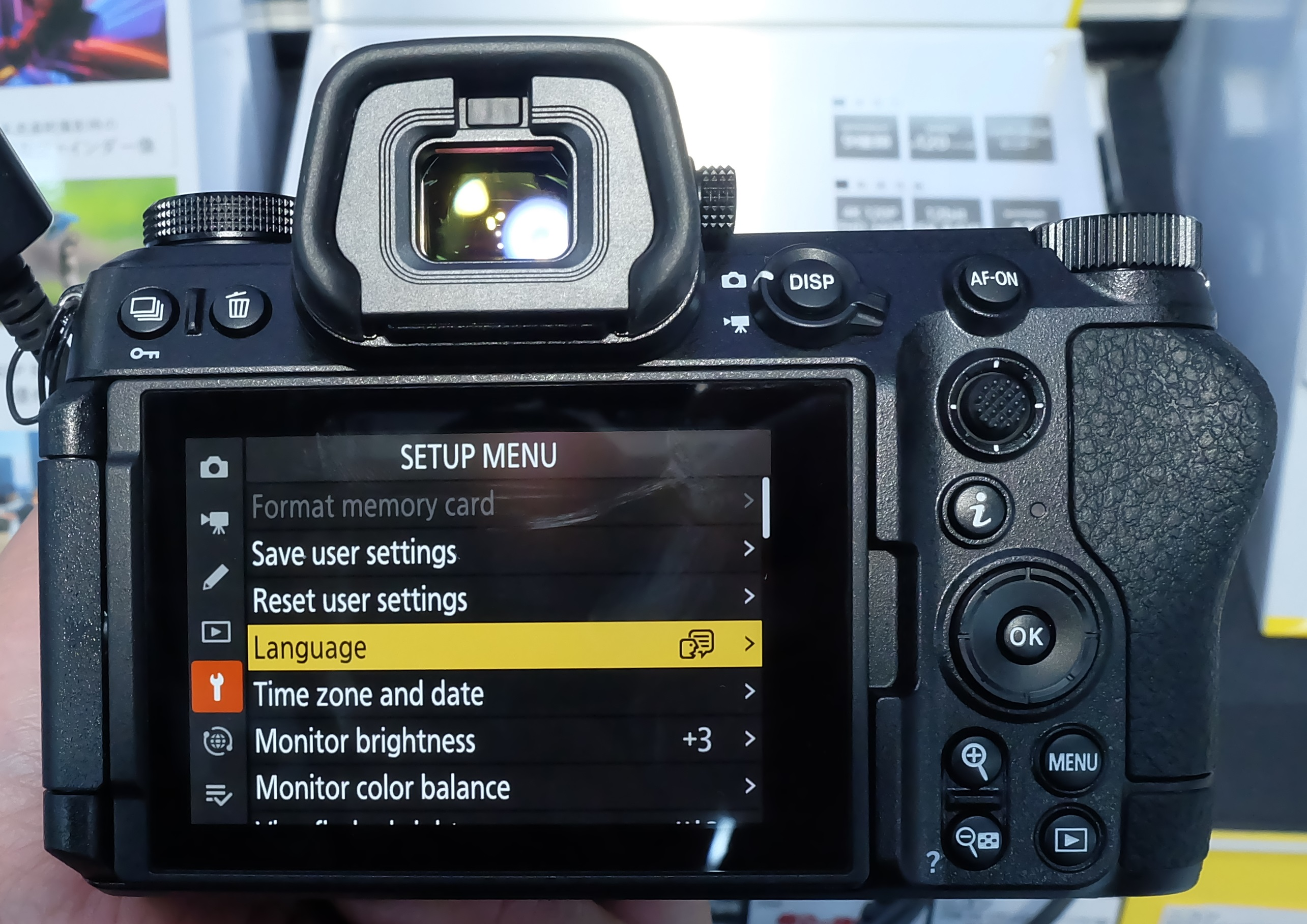

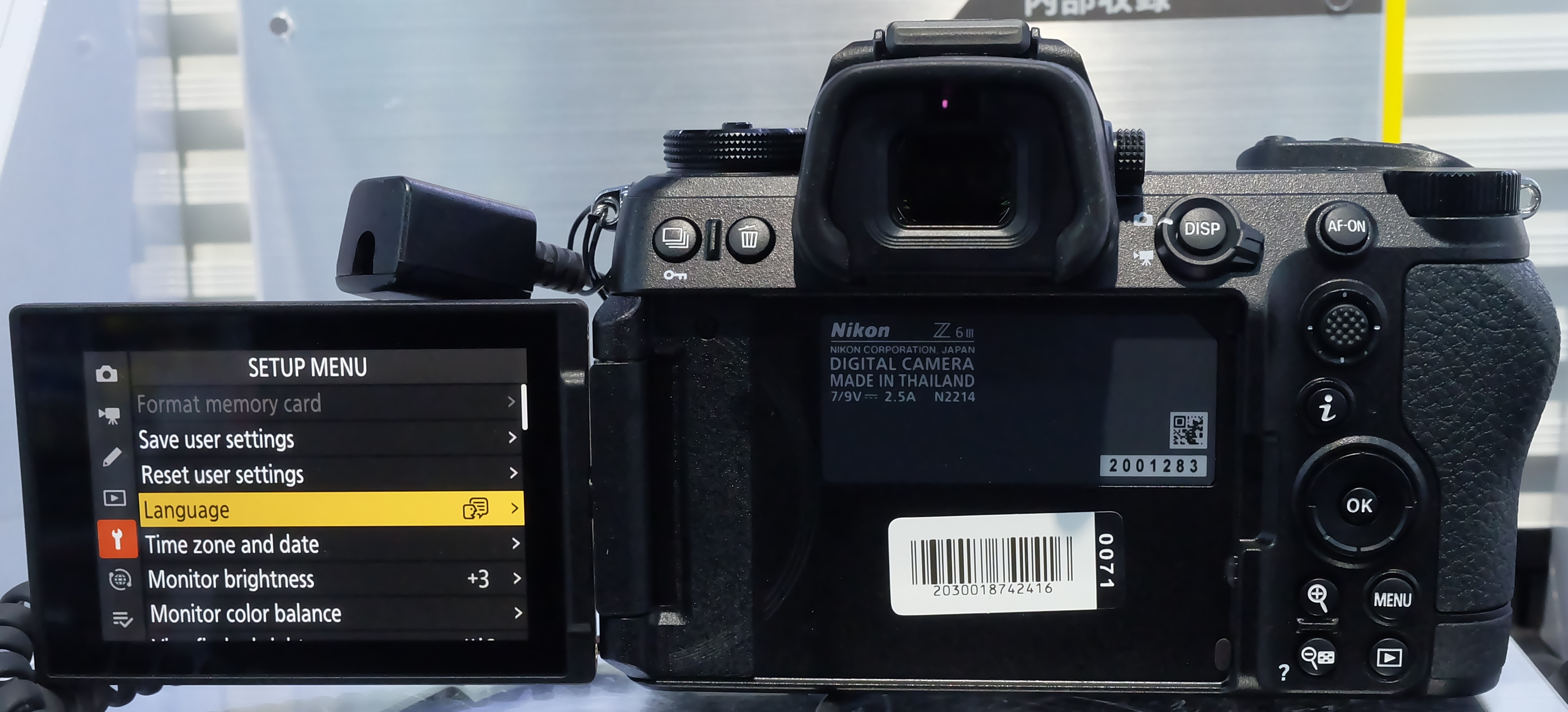

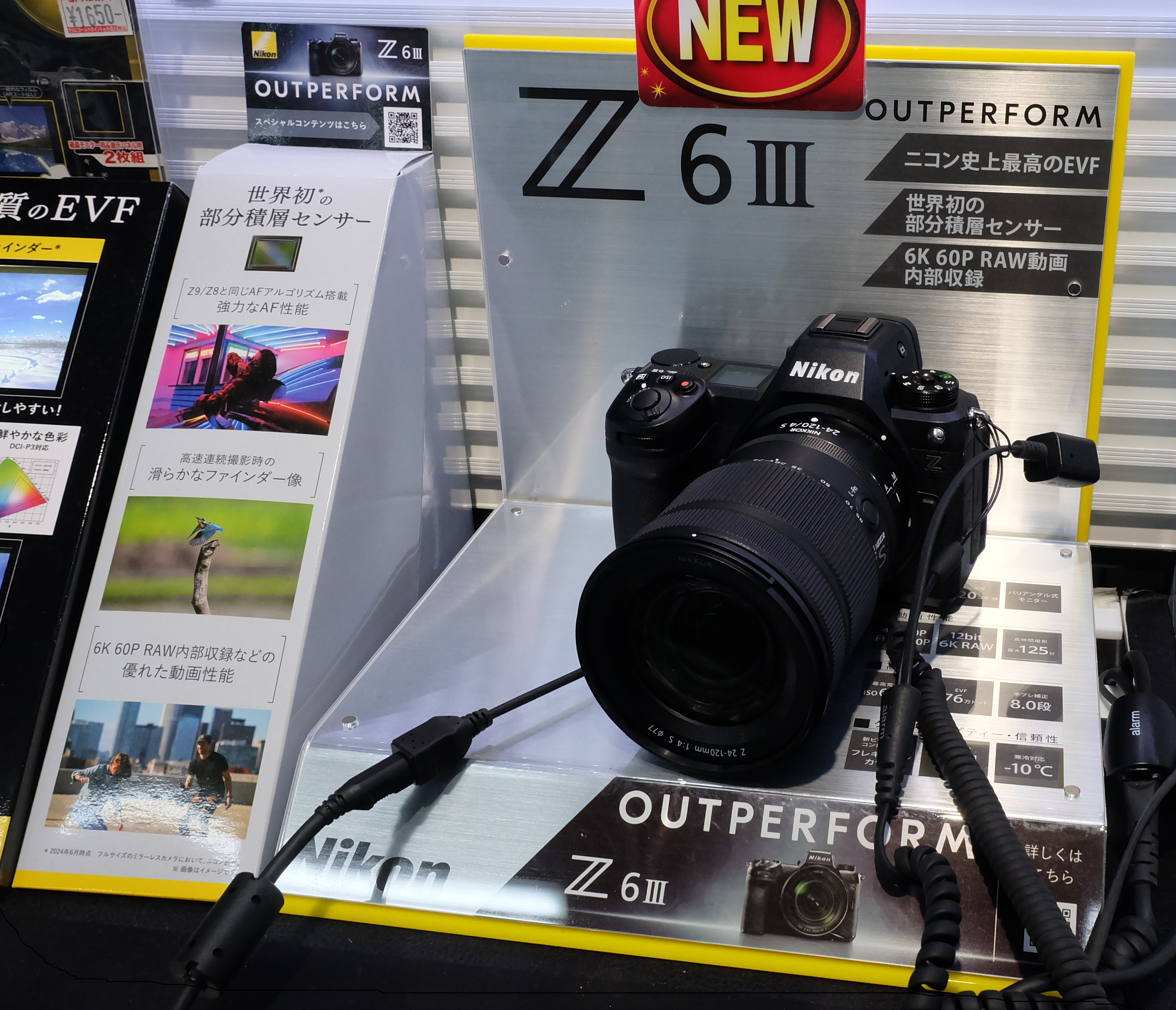

== Awards ==
The camera was awarded with:

- the Japan Institute of Design Promotion Good Design 2024 award,
- the iF Design Award 2025
- the TIPA World Awards 2025 in category Best Full Frame Expert Camera.
- a 2025 Red Dot Award for Product Design.

== Marketing slogan ==
When the Z6III was launched, Nikon used the following marketing slogans:

- English: “Outperform”,
- Japanese: "想像を超える、スピードへ" {"To a speed that surpasses imagination")

Sensor	Class	2018	2019	2020	2021	2022	2023	2024	2025	2026
FX (Full-frame)	Flagship					^{8K} Z9 ^{S}				
FX (Full-frame)	Flagship							^{8K} Z8 ^{S}		
FX (Full-frame)	Professional		^{4K} Z7 ^{S}		^{4K} Z7Ⅱ ^{S}					
FX (Full-frame)	Professional		^{4K} Z6 ^{S}		^{4K} Z6Ⅱ ^{S}				^{6K} Z6Ⅲ ^{S}	
FX (Full-frame)	Cinema									^{6K} ZR ^{S}
FX (Full-frame)	Enthusiast							^{4K} Zf ^{S}		
FX (Full-frame)	Enthusiast				^{4K} Z5 ^{S}					^{4K} Z5Ⅱ ^{S}
FX (Full-frame)	Entry-level									^{4K} Z5ⅡC ^{S}
DX (APS-C)	Enthusiast					^{4K} Zfc				
DX (APS-C)	Prosumer			^{4K} Z50					^{4K} Z50Ⅱ	
DX (APS-C)	Entry-level						^{4K} Z30			
Sensor	Class									
Sensor	Class	2018	2019	2020	2021	2022	2023	2024	2025	2026
