= 5Z =

5Z or 5-Z may refer to:

- 5Z, IATA code for CemAir
- 5Z, the production code for the 1982 Doctor Who serial Castrovalva
- R5D-5Z, a variant model of Douglas C-54 Skymaster
- R4D-5Z, a variant model of Douglas C-47 Skytrain

== See also ==
- Z5 (disambiguation)
