= Nikon Z5 =

2020 Full-frame mirrorless interchangeable-lens camera

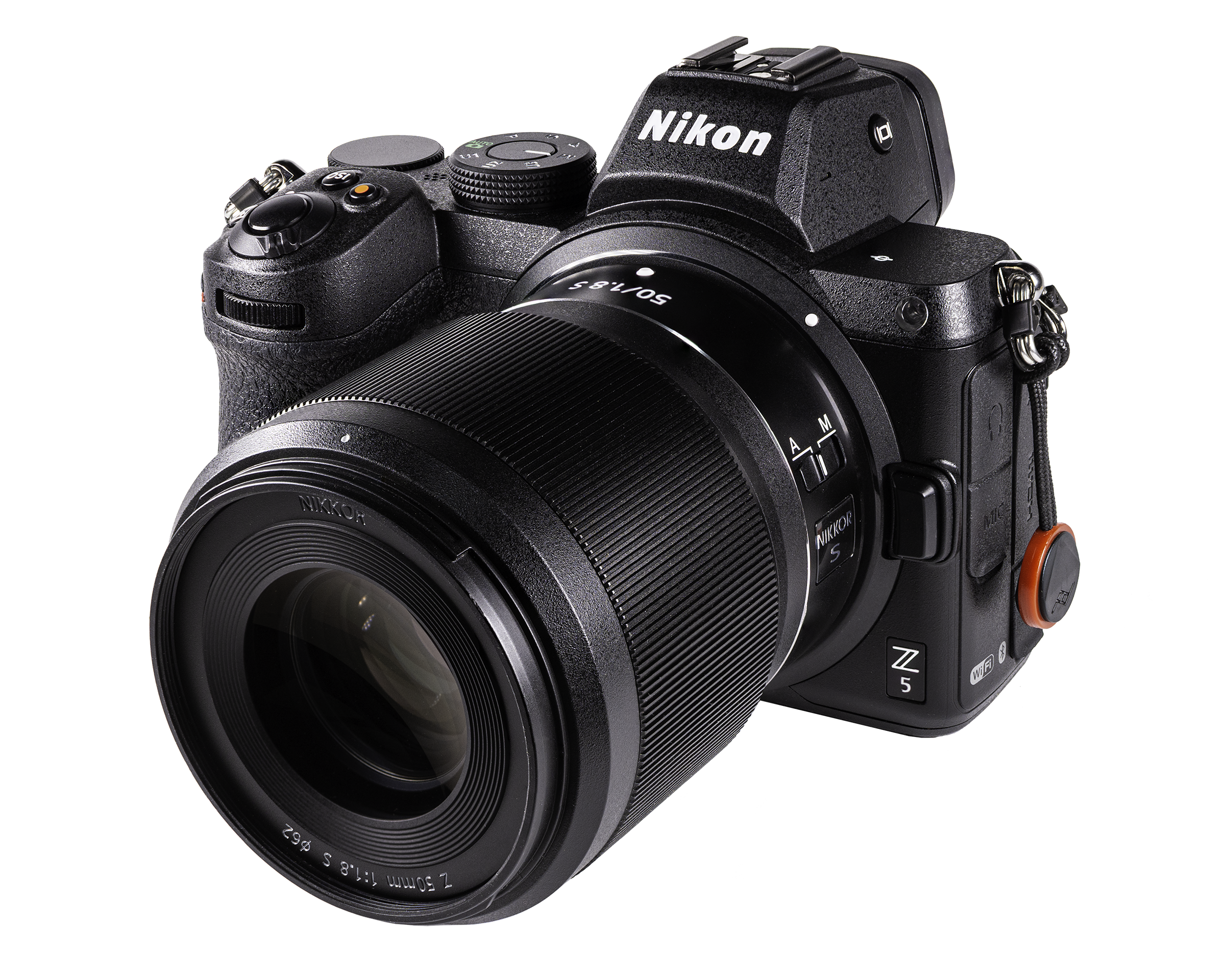
- Nikon Z5 with Nikkor Z 50 mm f/1.8 S

Overview
- Maker: Nikon
- Type: Full-frame mirrorless interchangeable-lens camera
- Released: July 21, 2020; 6 years ago

Lens
- Lens mount: Nikon Z-mount

Sensor/medium
- Sensor type: CMOS
- Sensor size: 35.9 mm × 23.9 mm full-frame
- Maximum resolution: 6016 × 4016 (24 effective megapixels)
- Film speed: ISO 100–51200 (standard); ISO 50–102400 (expandable)
- Recording medium: 2 × SD (UHS-II)

Focusing
- Focus: Hybrid AF
- Focus areas: 273 points

Exposure/metering
- Exposure modes: Programmed Auto [P] with flexible program; Shutter-Priority Auto [S]; Aperture-Priority Auto [A]; Manual [M]
- Exposure metering: TTL exposure metering

Flash
- Flash: Built-in: No; Hot shoe

Shutter
- Shutter: Electronically-controlled vertical-travel focal-plane mechanical shutter; electronic front-curtain shutter; electronic shutter
- Shutter speeds: 30 s–1/8000 s
- Continuous shooting: 4.5 frames per second

Viewfinder
- Viewfinder: Quad-VGA EVF (1280x960 pixels, 3.69 million 'dots')

Image processing
- Image processor: EXPEED 6

General
- Video recording: 4K UHD at 30p/25p/24p, Full HD
- LCD screen: 3.2-inch tilting TFT LCD with touchscreen, 1024x682 pixel resolution (1.04 million 'dots')
- Battery: EN-EL15c
- Optional accessories: MB-N10 battery grip (no controls); MC-N10 remote grip (fw. 1.40+)
- AV port(s): USB Type-C, Micro HDMI
- Data port(s): IEEE 802.11b/g/n/a/ac/Wi-Fi, Bluetooth Low Energy
- Body features: In-Body Image Stabilization
- Dimensions: 134×100.5×69.5 mm (5.28×3.96×2.74 in)
- Weight: 590 g (21 oz) (body only)
- Latest firmware: 1.50 / 10 June 2025; 17 months ago
- Made in: Thailand

Chronology
- Successor: Nikon Z5II

The Nikon Z5 is a full-frame mirrorless interchangeable-lens camera produced by Nikon. The camera was officially announced on July 21, 2020, at the price of US$1,399.00. It is an entry-level full-frame camera that uses Nikon's Z-mount system, becoming the third full-frame Z-mount body and the fourth Z-mount camera body.

The Nikon Z5 was succeeded by the Nikon Z5II on April 3, 2025.

== Features ==
- 24.1 megapixel CMOS sensor
- ISO 100 - 51,200
- Expeed 6 processor
- In-body image stabilization (IBIS)
- 3.2-inch touchscreen
- 3.69 million-dot OLED viewfinder
- Dual UHS-II SD card slots
- Made in Thailand

== Gallery ==
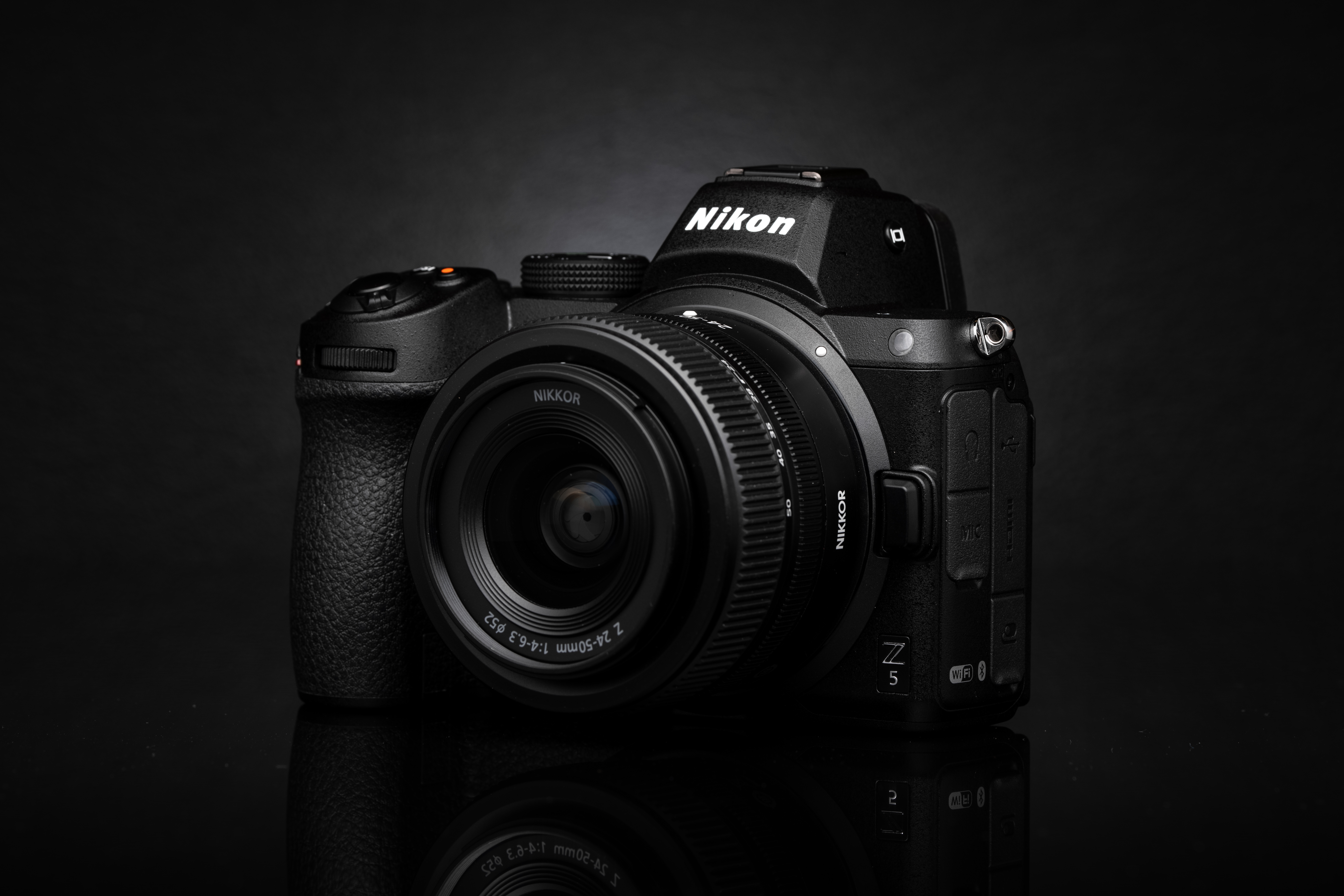
Z5 + Nikkor Z 24-50 mm f/4–6.3

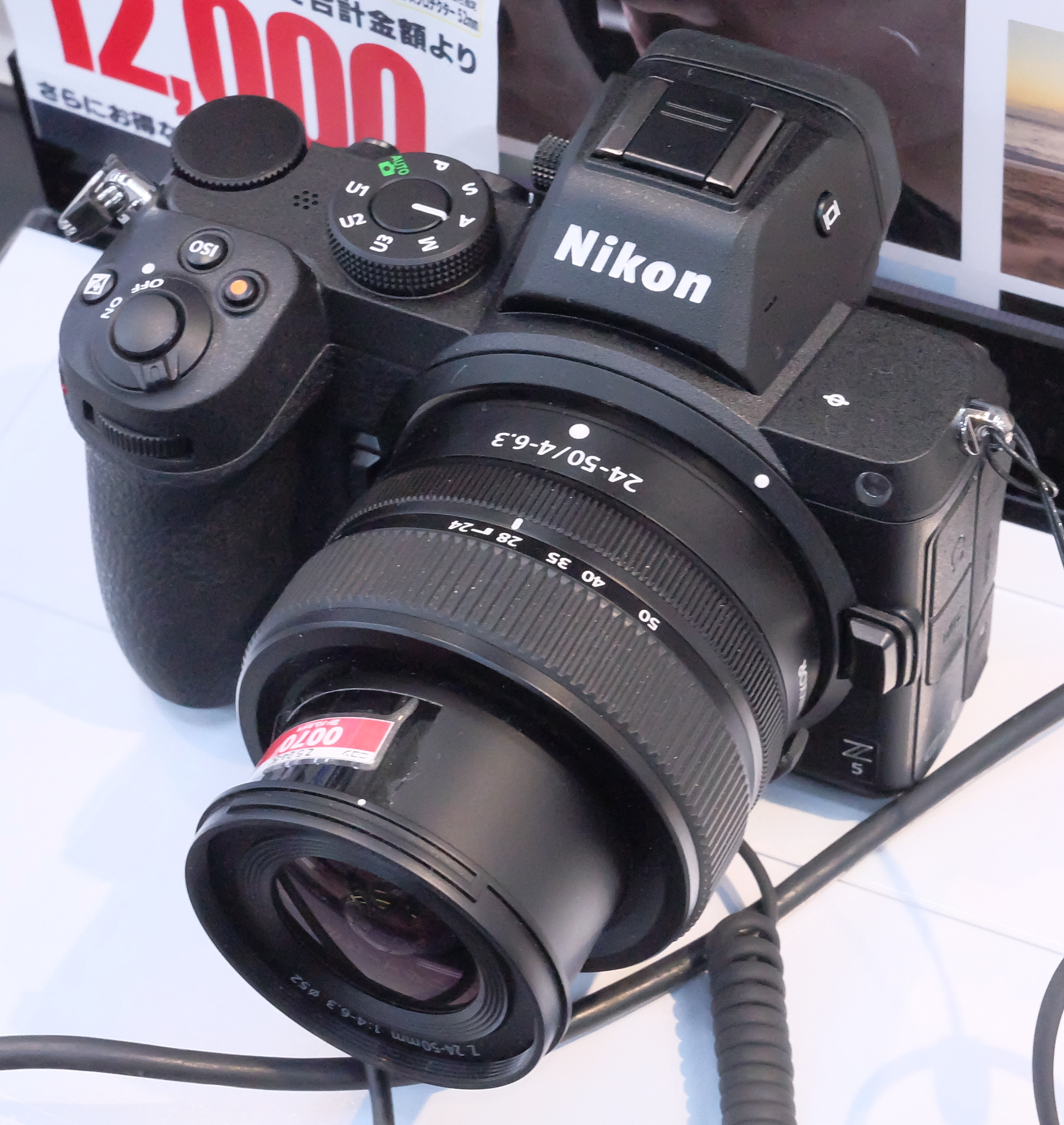

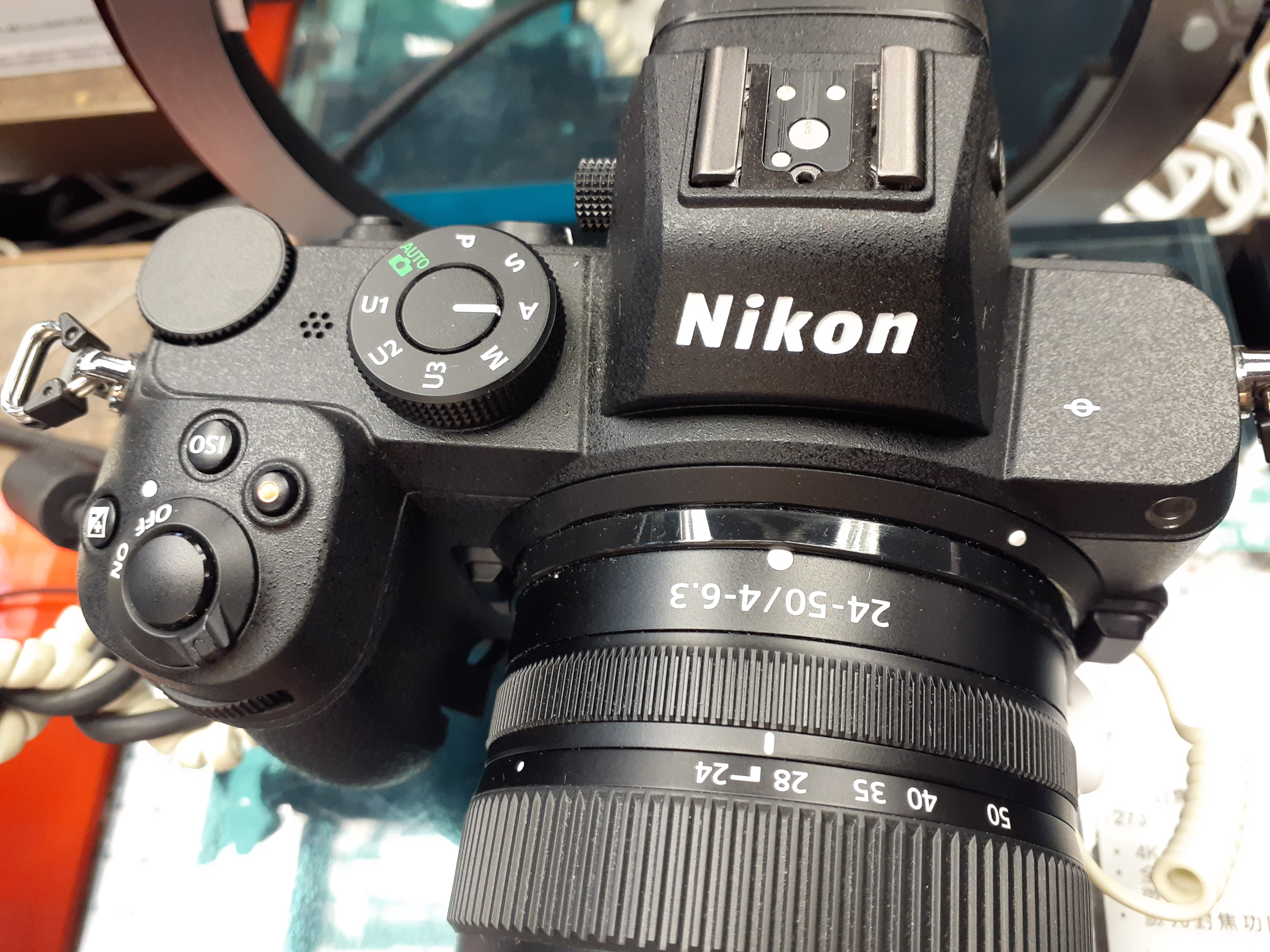
Top controls

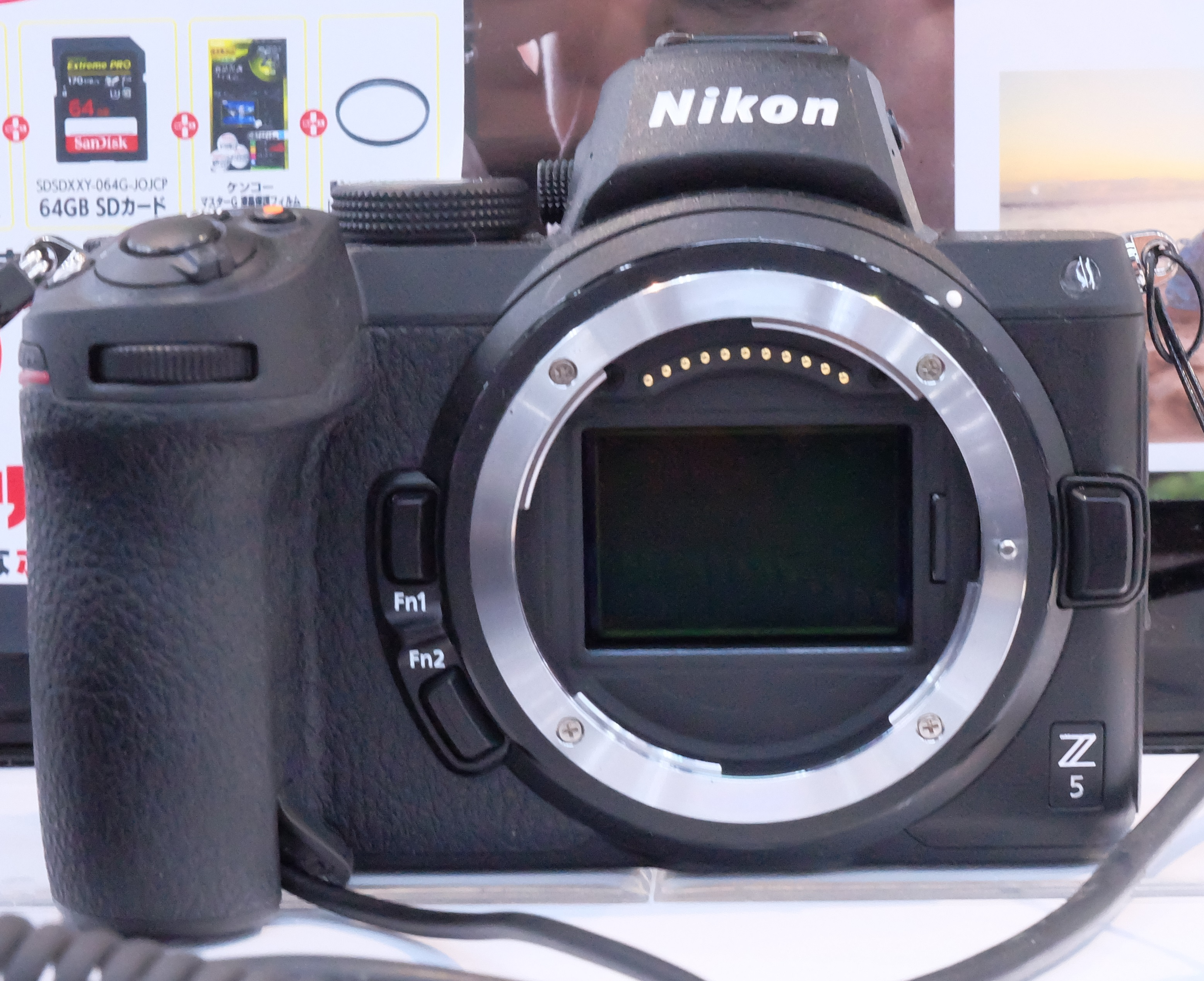

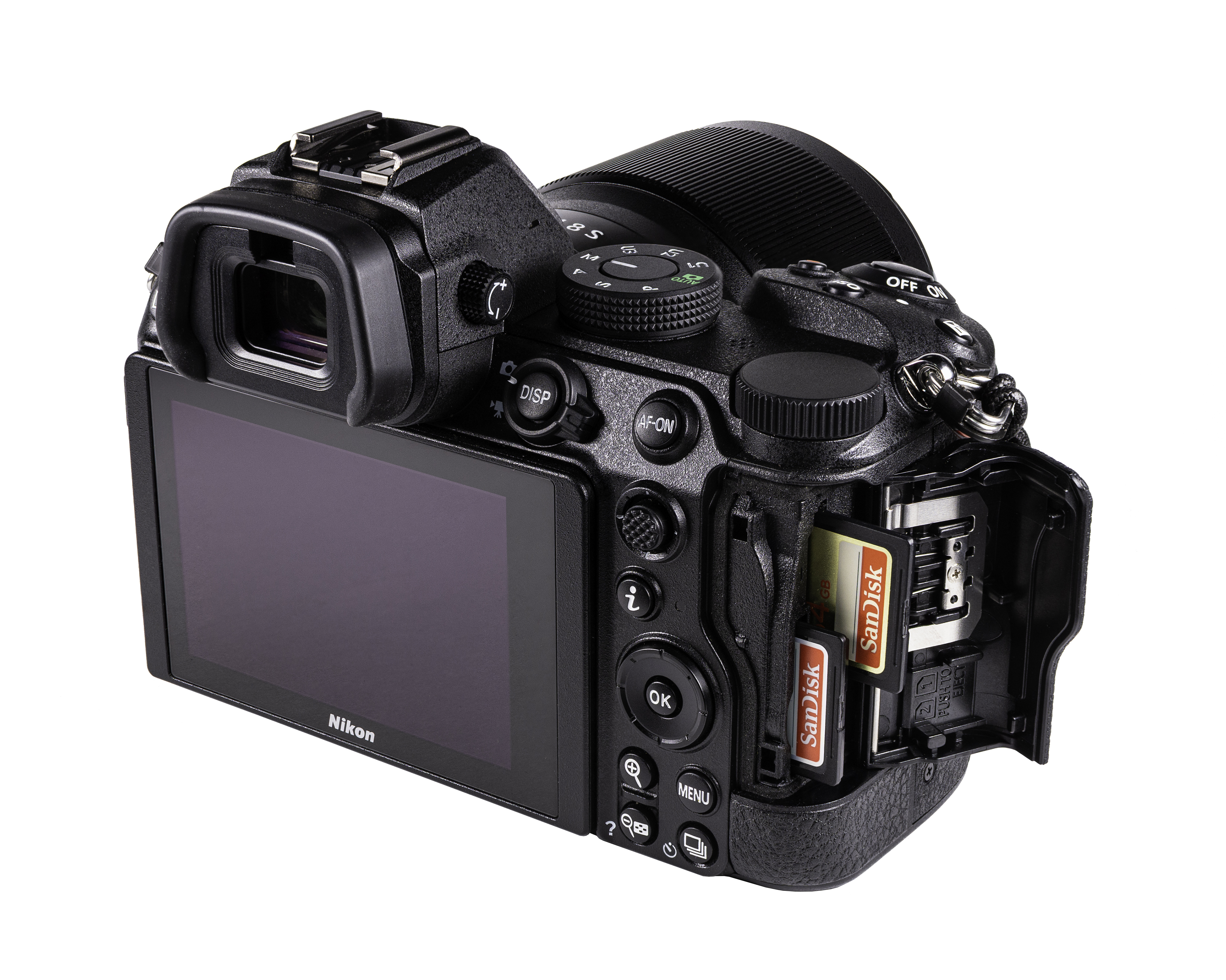
Rear view, with the dual SD card slots

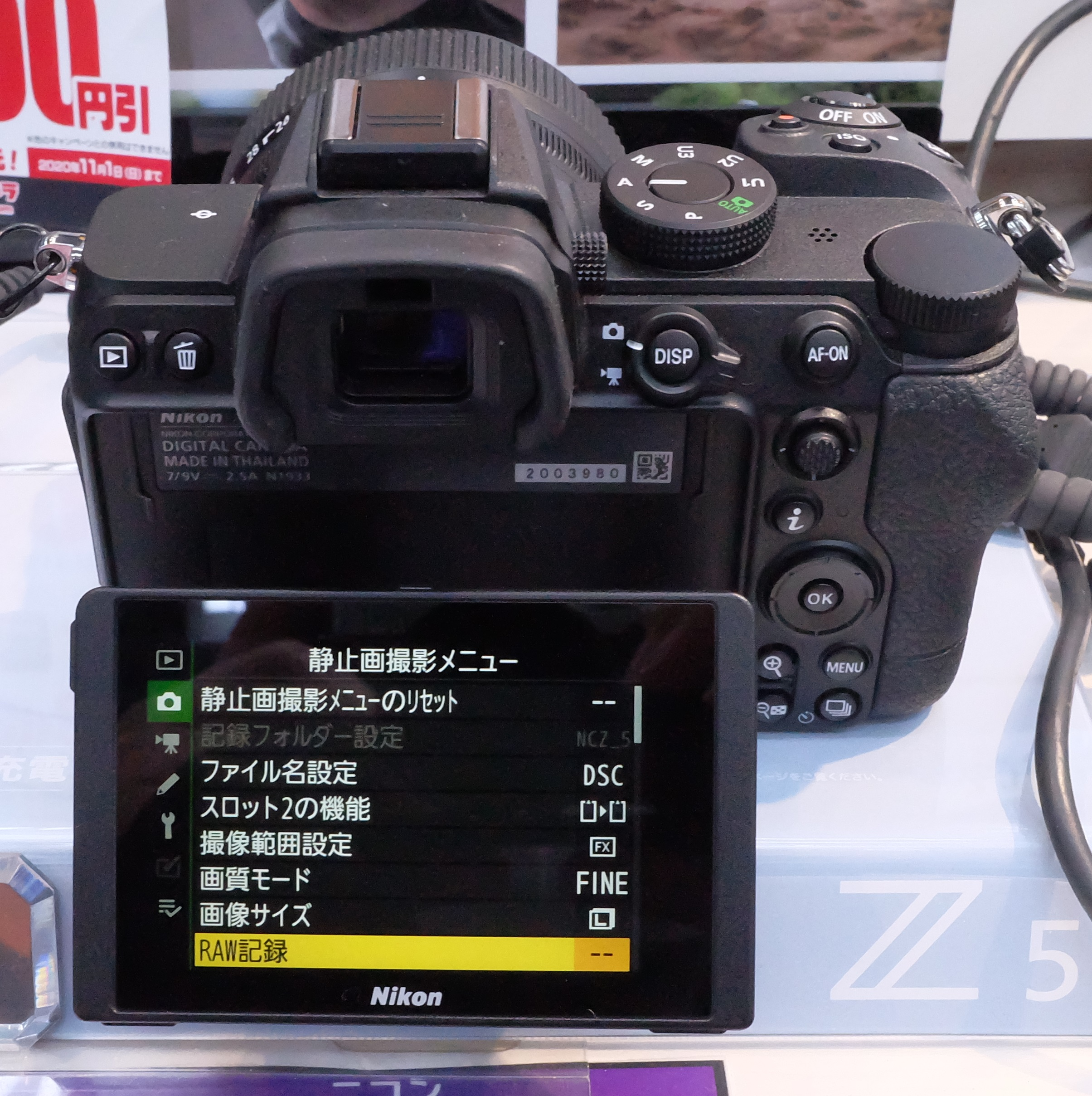
Rear screen in a tilted position

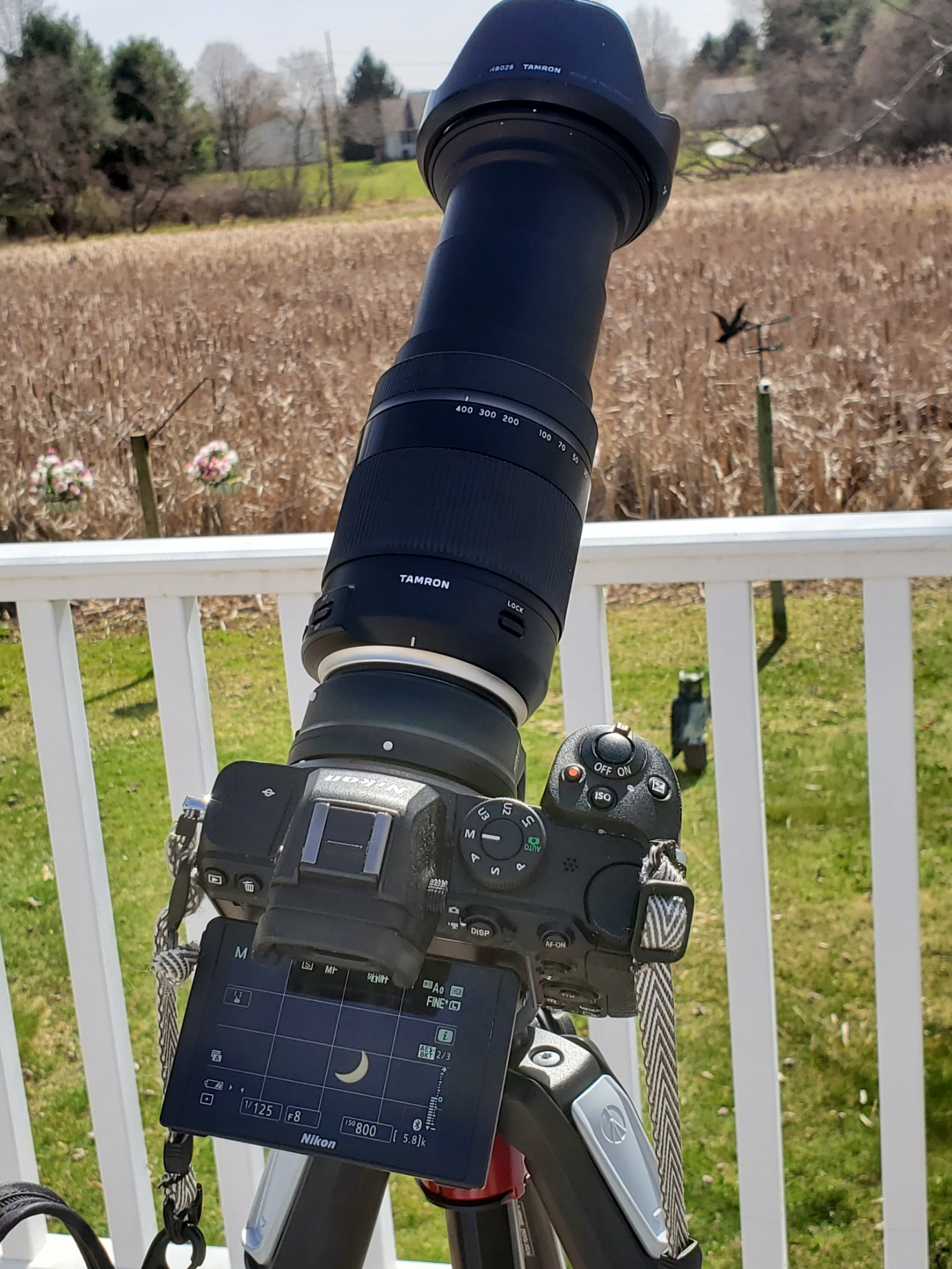
Z5 with an F-mount Tamron 18-400 mm lens, using the FTZ mount adapter

== Update history ==
| Version | Release date | Notes |
|---|---|---|
| 1.00 | 2020-07-21 | Initial firmware version |
| 1.01 | 2020-10-12 | |
| 1.02 | 2020-10-27 | |
| 1.10 | 2021-04-26 | Added support for NIKKOR Z MC 50mm f/2.8 and NIKKOR Z MC 105mm f/2.8 VR S lenses. |
| 1.11 | 2021-10-06 | |
| 1.20 | 2021-11-10 | Added support for: FTZ II mount adapters; NIKKOR Z 24-120mm f/4 S lenses; NIKKOR Z 28-75mm f/2.8 lenses; NIKKOR Z 400mm f/2.8 TC VR S lenses |
| 1.21 | 2022-10-27 | |
| 1.40 | 2023-02-15 | |
| 1.41 | 2023-09-27 | |
| 1.42 | 2024-01-17 | |
| 1.43 | 2024-04-17 | |
| 1.50 | 2025-06-10 | |

| Sensor | Class | 2018 | 2019 | 2020 | 2021 | 2022 | 2023 | 2024 | 2025 | 2026 |
|---|---|---|---|---|---|---|---|---|---|---|
| FX (Full-frame) | Flagship | | | | | ^{8K} Z9 ^{S} | | | | |
| FX (Full-frame) | Flagship | | | | | | | ^{8K} Z8 ^{S} | | |
| FX (Full-frame) | Professional | | ^{4K} Z7 ^{S} | | ^{4K} Z7Ⅱ ^{S} | | | | | |
| FX (Full-frame) | Professional | | ^{4K} Z6 ^{S} | | ^{4K} Z6Ⅱ ^{S} | | | | ^{6K} Z6Ⅲ ^{S} | |
| FX (Full-frame) | Cinema | | | | | | | | | ^{6K} ZR ^{S} |
| FX (Full-frame) | Enthusiast | | | | | | | ^{4K} Zf ^{S} | | |
| FX (Full-frame) | Enthusiast | | | | ^{4K} Z5 ^{S} | | | | | ^{4K} Z5Ⅱ ^{S} |
| FX (Full-frame) | Entry-level | | | | | | | | | ^{4K} Z5ⅡC ^{S} |
| DX (APS-C) | Enthusiast | | | | | | | | ^{4K} Z50Ⅱ | |
| DX (APS-C) | Enthusiast | | | | | ^{4K} Zfc | | | | |
| DX (APS-C) | Prosumer | | | ^{4K} Z50 | | | | | | |
| DX (APS-C) | Entry-level | | | | | | ^{4K} Z30 | | | |
| Sensor | Class | | | | | | | | | |
| Sensor | Class | 2018 | 2019 | 2020 | 2021 | 2022 | 2023 | 2024 | 2025 | 2026 |
