= Nikon Z5IIC =

2026 mirrorless interchangeable-lens camera

- Nikon Z5IIC + Nikkor Z 24-50mm f/4–6.3

Overview
- Maker: Nikon
- Type: Full-frame mirrorless interchangeable-lens camera
- Released: 23 October 2026; 26 days ago
- Intro price: USD 1,396.95; JPY 238,700

Lens
- Lens mount: Nikon Z-mount

Sensor/medium
- Sensor type: BSI-CMOS Sensor
- Sensor size: Full frame (35.9 x 23.9 mm); Nikon FX format
- Sensor maker: Sony Semiconductor Manufacturing Corporation
- Maximum resolution: 6,048 × 4,032 (24.5 effective megapixels)
- Film speed: ISO 100–64000 (standard); ISO 100–204800 (expandable)
- Recording medium: 1 × SDXC (UHS-II)

Focusing
- Focus: Hybrid AF
- Focus modes: Pinpoint AF; Single-point AF; Dynamic-area AF (S, M, L); Wide-area AF (S, L, C1, C2)^{s}; 3D-Tracking^{s} (Note: 3D-Tracking is an advanced autofocus mode. When selected, it locks onto a subject by analyzing its shape, contrast, and color. Once locked, this allows the camera to follow it across the frame as either the subject moves or your framing changes.); Auto-area AF^{s}; ^{s} supports Subject Detection
- Focus areas: 273 points

Exposure/metering
- Exposure: TTL exposure metering
- Exposure modes: Programmed Auto [P] with flexible program; Shutter-Priority Auto [S]; Aperture-Priority Auto [A]; Manual [M]; Scene Modes [SCN] (Note: The supported scenes are: portrait, landscape, child, sports, close up, night portrait, night landscape, party/indoor, beach/snow, sunset, dusk/dawn, pet portrait, candlelight, blossom, autumn colors, and food.)
- Exposure metering: TTL metering using camera image sensor; -4 to +17 EV, ISO 100

Flash
- Flash: Built-in: No; Hot shoe
- Flash synchronization: 1/200 s

Shutter
- Shutter: Electronically controlled vertical-travel focal-plane mechanical shutter, Electronic front-curtain shutter, Electronic Shutter
- Shutter speeds: 900–1/8000 s, Bulb, Time, X
- Continuous shooting: 7.8 fps / 14 fps (expand)

Viewfinder
- Electronic viewfinder: 0.39" (1 cm) OLED, 3.69m dots up to 3000 nits brightness

Image processing
- Image processor: EXPEED 7
- White balance: Auto (3 variants); natural light auto; direct sunlight; cloudy; shade; incandescent; fluorescent (7 variants); flash; manual white point (2500‑10000 K); preset manual (6 variants)

General
- Video recording: 4K UHD at 30/25/24p; Full HD at 120/100/60/50/30/25/24p
- LCD screen: 3.2-inch variangle TFT LCD with touchscreen, 2.10 million dots
- Battery: EN-EL15c; USB-PD rechargeable (EN-EL15a/b usable with lower battery life)
- AV port(s): USB-C, HDMI Type-D, 3.5 mm stereo microphone jack, 3.5 mm stereo headphone jack
- Data port(s): IEEE 802.11b/g/n/a/ac/Wi-Fi, Bluetooth 5.0
- Body features: In-Body Image Stabilization
- Dimensions: 134×80.5×72 mm (5.28×3.17×2.83 in)
- Weight: 538 g (19 oz) (body only); 620 g (includes battery)
- Made in: Thailand

Chronology
- Predecessor: Nikon Z5II

The Nikon Z5IIC is a full-frame mirrorless interchangeable-lens camera produced by Nikon. It was announced on September 24, 2026 (in US and Europe), and on September 28, 2026 (in Japan). Based on the Nikon Z5II but without an EVF, it features a design that somewhat resembles the Nikon Z30. Z5IIC's body width and height, but not depth, is similar to the Nikon ZR. The camera body is available in two colors: black or silver and black. It is the twelfth full-frame Z-mount body and the sixteenth Z-mount camera body.

== Features ==
Feature-wise, it is similar to the Nikon Z5II, including use of the EXPEED 7 image processor, N-RAW video recording, a dedicated "Picture Control" button, and IBIS (sensor-shift 5-axis stabilization providing up to 7.5 steps of compensation).

There are notable differences from the Z5II. Additions include a tally light, an "SCN" (Scene) position on the mode dial (replacing the U3), a fish-detect autofocus mode (in addition to people, animals, birds, vehicles, and airplanes), and film grain simulation. Downgrades include removing the electronic viewfinder (EVF), switching to a 1.04 million dot touchscreen LCD, moving to a single SDXC card slot, removing the joystick, and removing electrical connectors in the battery compartment (i.e., dropping support for the MB-N11 and MB-N14 battery grips). These changes have contributed to a lower price than Z5II.

== Lenses ==
The Z5IIC uses the Nikon Z-mount, developed by Nikon for its mirrorless digital cameras.

Nikon F-mount lenses can be used, with various degrees of compatibility, via the Nikon FTZ (F-to-Z) and FTZ II mount adapters.

== Marketing slogans ==
When the Z5IIC was launched, Nikon used the following marketing slogans:

- English: "Capture the spark",
- Japanese: "いま撮らなきゃ" ("If I don't shoot now")

== Notes ==
Sensor	Class	2018	2019	2020	2021	2022	2023	2024	2025	2026
FX (Full-frame)	Flagship					^{8K} Z9 ^{S}				
FX (Full-frame)	Flagship							^{8K} Z8 ^{S}		
FX (Full-frame)	Professional		^{4K} Z7 ^{S}		^{4K} Z7Ⅱ ^{S}					
FX (Full-frame)	Professional		^{4K} Z6 ^{S}		^{4K} Z6Ⅱ ^{S}				^{6K} Z6Ⅲ ^{S}	
FX (Full-frame)	Cinema									^{6K} ZR ^{S}
FX (Full-frame)	Enthusiast							^{4K} Zf ^{S}		
FX (Full-frame)	Enthusiast				^{4K} Z5 ^{S}					^{4K} Z5Ⅱ ^{S}
FX (Full-frame)	Entry-level									^{4K} Z5ⅡC ^{S}
DX (APS-C)	Enthusiast								^{4K} Z50Ⅱ	
DX (APS-C)	Enthusiast					^{4K} Zfc				
DX (APS-C)	Prosumer			^{4K} Z50						
DX (APS-C)	Entry-level						^{4K} Z30			
Sensor	Class									
Sensor	Class	2018	2019	2020	2021	2022	2023	2024	2025	2026
