= Nikon Z5II =

2025 Full-frame mirrorless interchangeable-lens camera

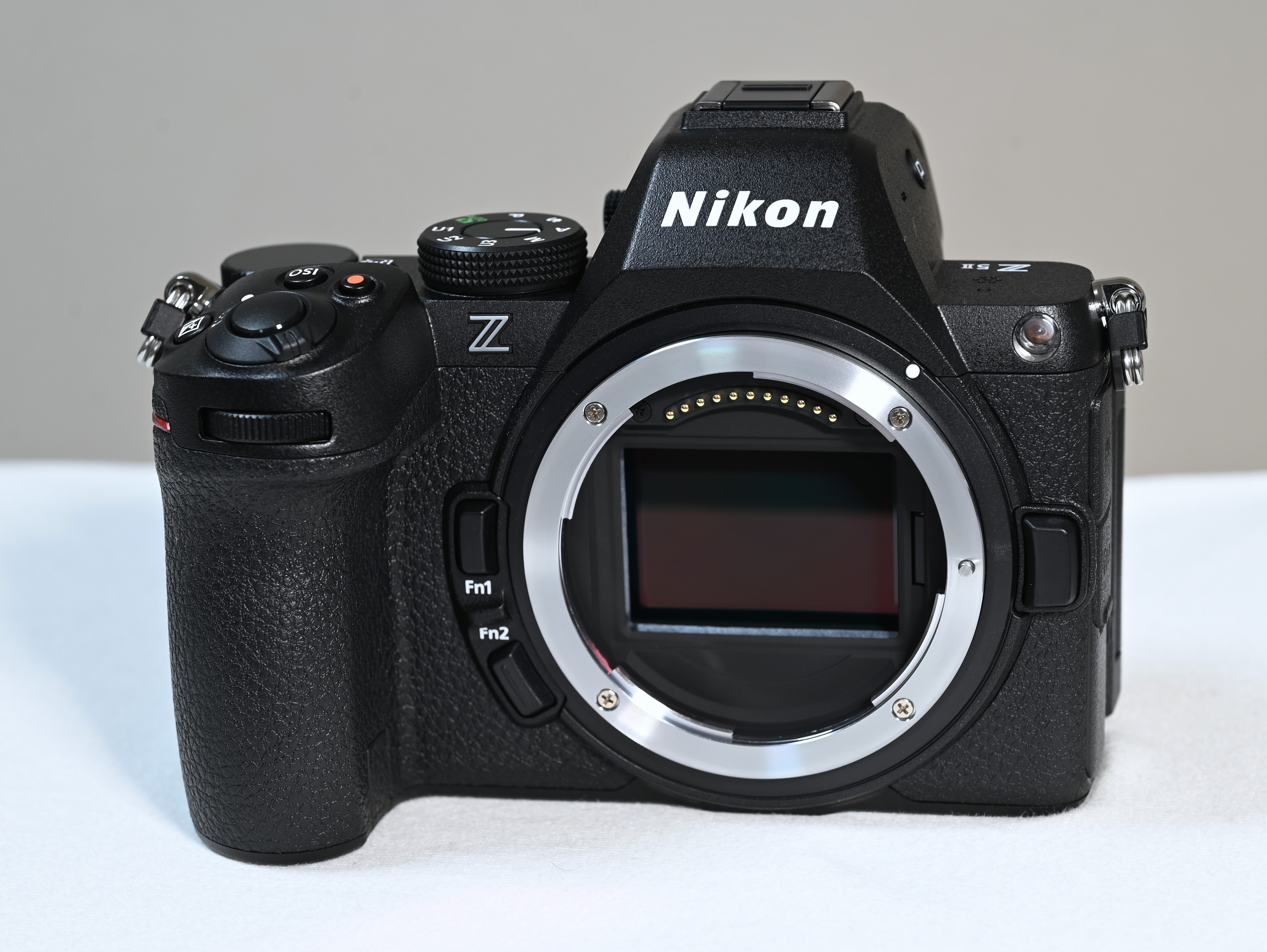

Overview
- Maker: Nikon
- Type: Full-frame mirrorless interchangeable-lens camera
- Released: 3 April 2025; 19 months ago
- Intro price: US$1,696.95

Lens
- Lens mount: Nikon Z-mount

Sensor/medium
- Sensor type: BSI-CMOS Sensor
- Sensor size: 35.9 mm × 23.9 mm Full Frame (Nikon FX format)
- Sensor maker: Sony Semiconductor Manufacturing Corporation
- Maximum resolution: 6,048 × 4,032 (24.5 effective megapixels)
- Film speed: ISO 100–64000 (standard); ISO 100–204800 (expandable)
- Recording medium: 2 × SD (UHS-II)

Focusing
- Focus: Hybrid AF
- Focus modes: Pinpoint AF; Single-point AF; Dynamic-area AF (S, M, L); Wide-area AF (S, L, C1, C2)^{s}; 3D-Tracking^{s} (Note: 3D-Tracking is an advanced autofocus mode. When selected, it locks onto a subject by analyzing its shape, contrast, and color. Once locked, this allows the camera to follow it across the frame as either the subject moves or your framing changes.); Auto-area AF^{s}; ^{s} supports Subject Detection
- Focus areas: 273 points

Exposure/metering
- Exposure: TTL exposure metering
- Exposure modes: Programmed Auto [P] with flexible program; Shutter-Priority Auto [S]; Aperture-Priority Auto [A]; Manual [M]
- Exposure metering: TTL metering using camera image sensor; -4 to +17 EV, ISO 100

Flash
- Flash: Built-in: No; Hot shoe
- Flash synchronization: 1/200 s

Shutter
- Shutter: Electronically controlled vertical-travel focal-plane mechanical shutter, Electronic front-curtain shutter, Electronic Shutter
- Shutter speeds: 900–1/8000 s, Bulb, Time, X
- Continuous shooting: 7.8 fps / 14 fps (expand)

Viewfinder
- Viewfinder: 0.5 inch Quad-VGA OLED EVF (3,690,000 'dots'), 3000 cd/m² (NITS)

Image processing
- Image processor: EXPEED 7
- White balance: Auto (3 variants); natural light auto; direct sunlight; cloudy; shade; incandescent; fluorescent (7 variants); flash; manual white point (2500‑10000 K); preset manual (6 variants)

General
- Video recording: 4K UHD at 30/25/24p; Full HD at 120/100/60/50/30/25/24p
- LCD screen: 3.2-inch variangle TFT LCD with touchscreen, 2.10 million dots
- Battery: EN-EL15c; USB-C PD rechargeable (EN-EL15a/b usable with lower battery life)
- Optional accessories: MB-N14 battery grip MB-N11 battery grip MC-N10 remote grip
- AV port(s): USB-C, HDMI Type-D, 3.5 mm stereo microphone jack, 3.5 mm stereo headphone jack
- Data port(s): IEEE 802.11b/g/n/a/ac/Wi-Fi, Bluetooth 5.0
- Body features: In-Body Image Stabilization
- Dimensions: 134×100×72 mm (5.3×3.9×2.8 in)
- Weight: 620 g (22 oz) (body only); 700 g (includes battery)
- Latest firmware: 1.20 / 18 August 2026; 2 months ago
- Made in: Thailand

Chronology
- Predecessor: Nikon Z5

The Nikon Z5II is a full-frame mirrorless interchangeable-lens camera produced by Nikon. The camera was officially announced on April 3, 2025, at the price of US$1,696. It is an entry-level full-frame camera that uses Nikon's Z-mount system. It is the successor to the Nikon Z5 released in 2020, becoming the tenth full-frame Z-mount body and the fourteenth Z-mount camera body.

A follow-on model, the Z5IIC, was based on the Z5II, but without an EVF and having only a single card slot.

== Features ==
Improvements over the previous Z5 model include:

- A new BSI CMOS sensor with less noise (same as the Z6II/Zf)
- Much better autofocus due to the EXPEED 7 image processor with 7 EV higher sensitivity
- Support for HEIF still images
- Brighter viewfinder (3000 nits, increased from the Z5's 1000 nits)
- Faster continuous release frame rates, including support of pre-release capture.
- New dedicated Picture Control button (first introduced on the Z50II)
- Expanded video options
  - 4K can be recorded at 30 fps without a crop, while the Z5 added a 1.7x crop. 4K at 60 fps applies a 1.5x crop.
  - 1080p video can be recorded at 120 fps, while the Z5 was limited to 60 fps.
  - N-RAW video with 12-bits (using TicoRAW) and 10-bit HEVC video is supported, while the Z5 only supported 8-bit video.
  - Product review mode autofocus setting

== Lenses ==
The Z5II uses the Nikon Z-mount, developed by Nikon for its mirrorless digital cameras.

Nikon F-mount lenses can be used, with various degrees of compatibility, via the Nikon FTZ (F-to-Z) and FTZ II mount adapters.

== Gallery ==
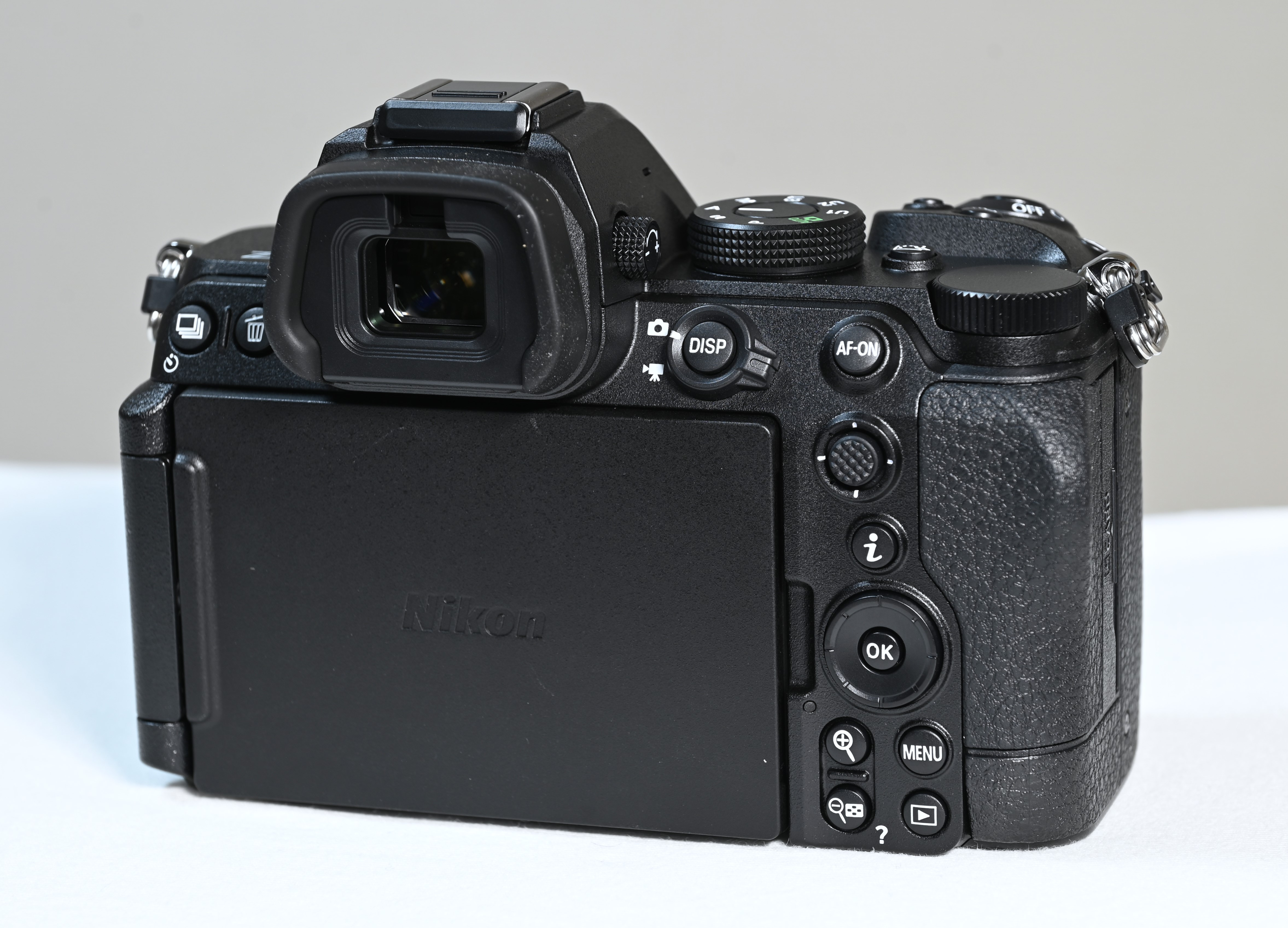

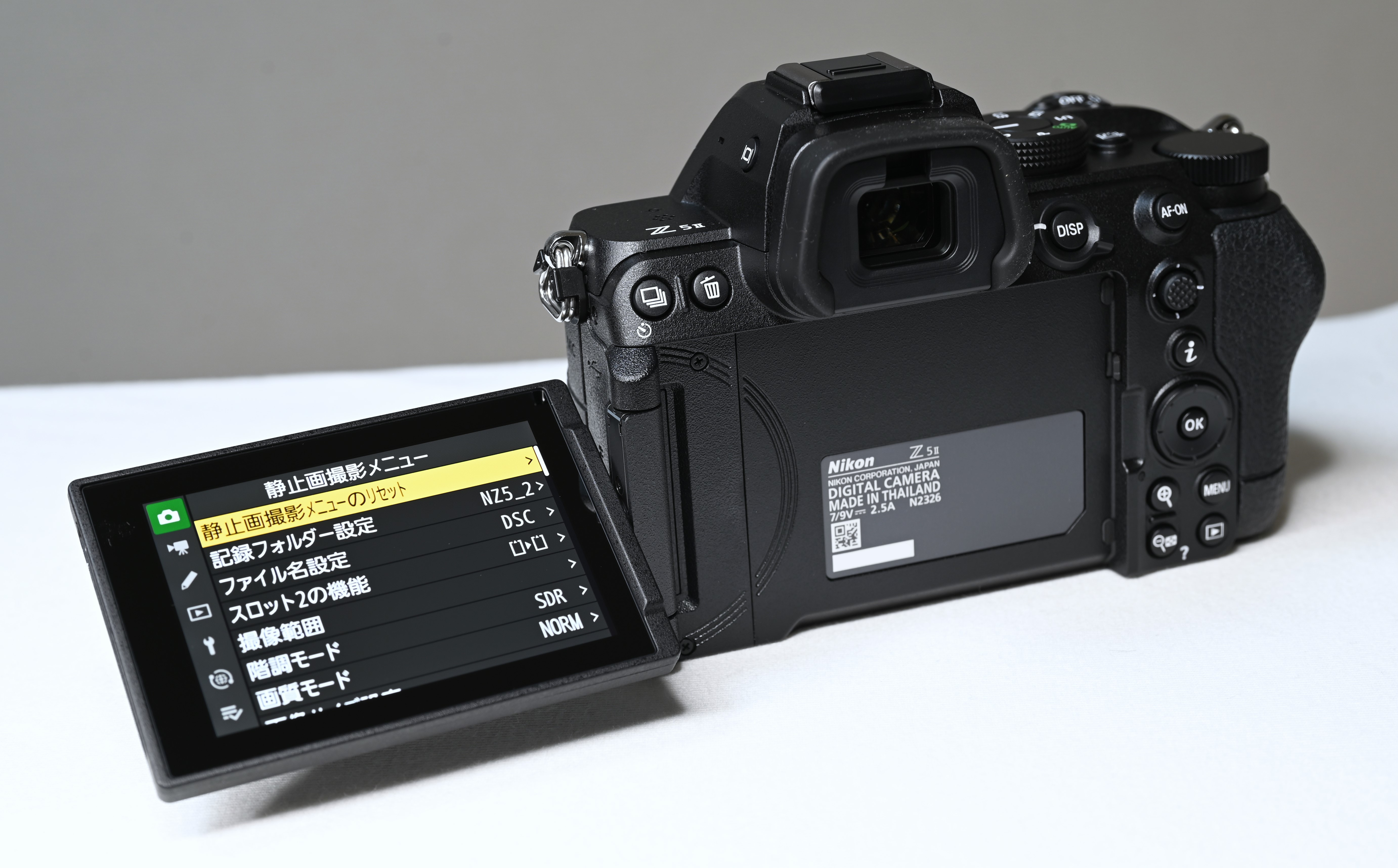

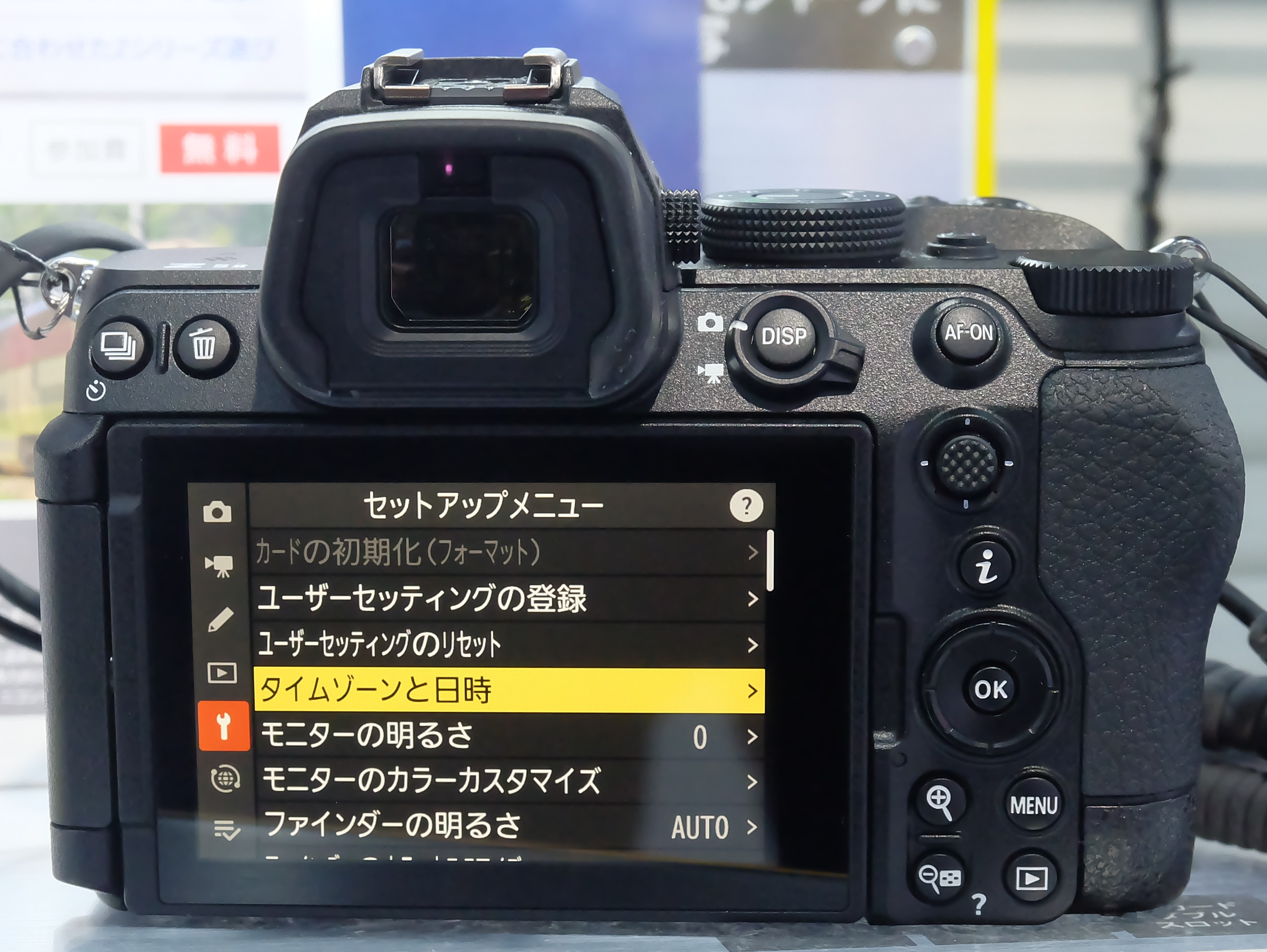

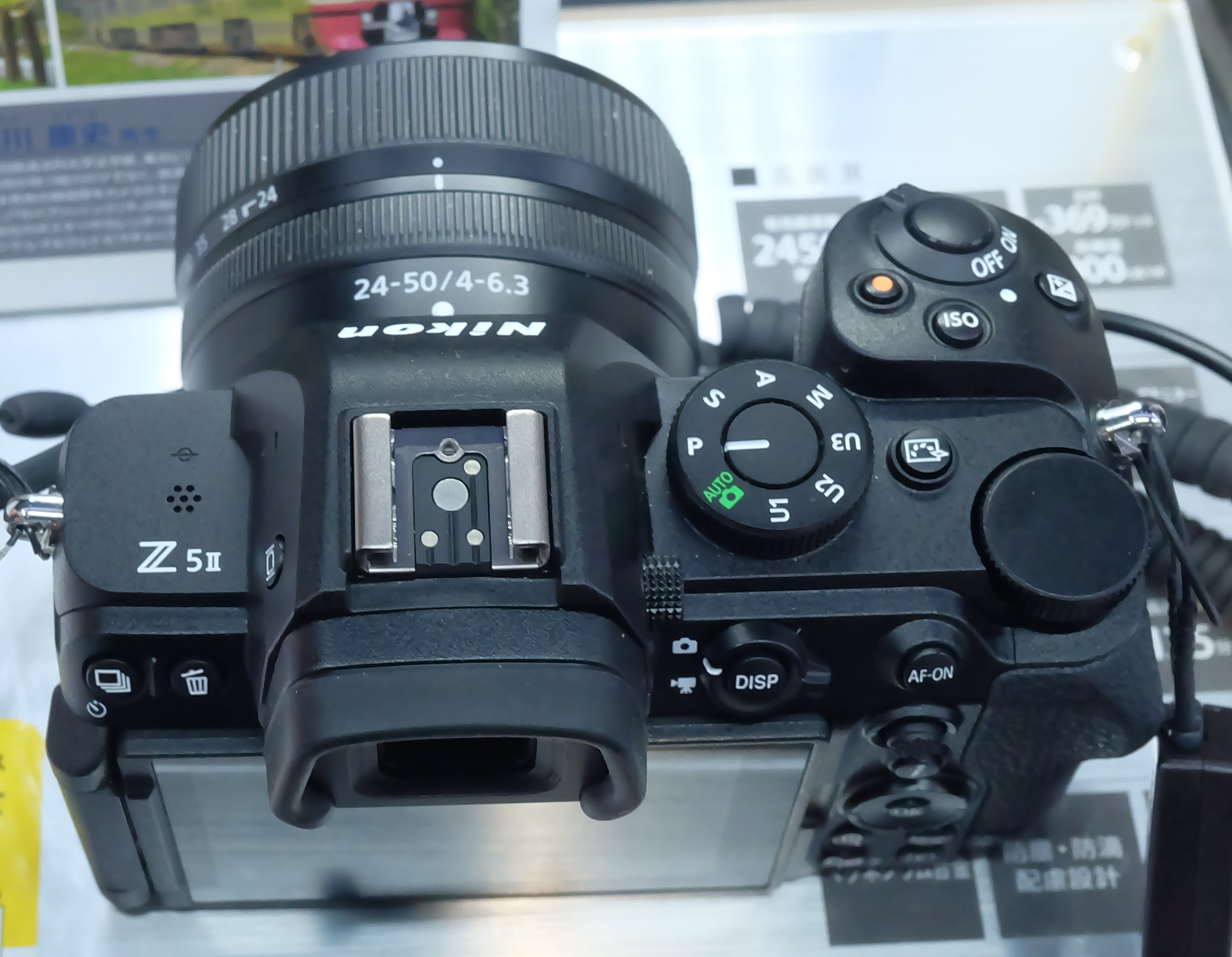
Top controls

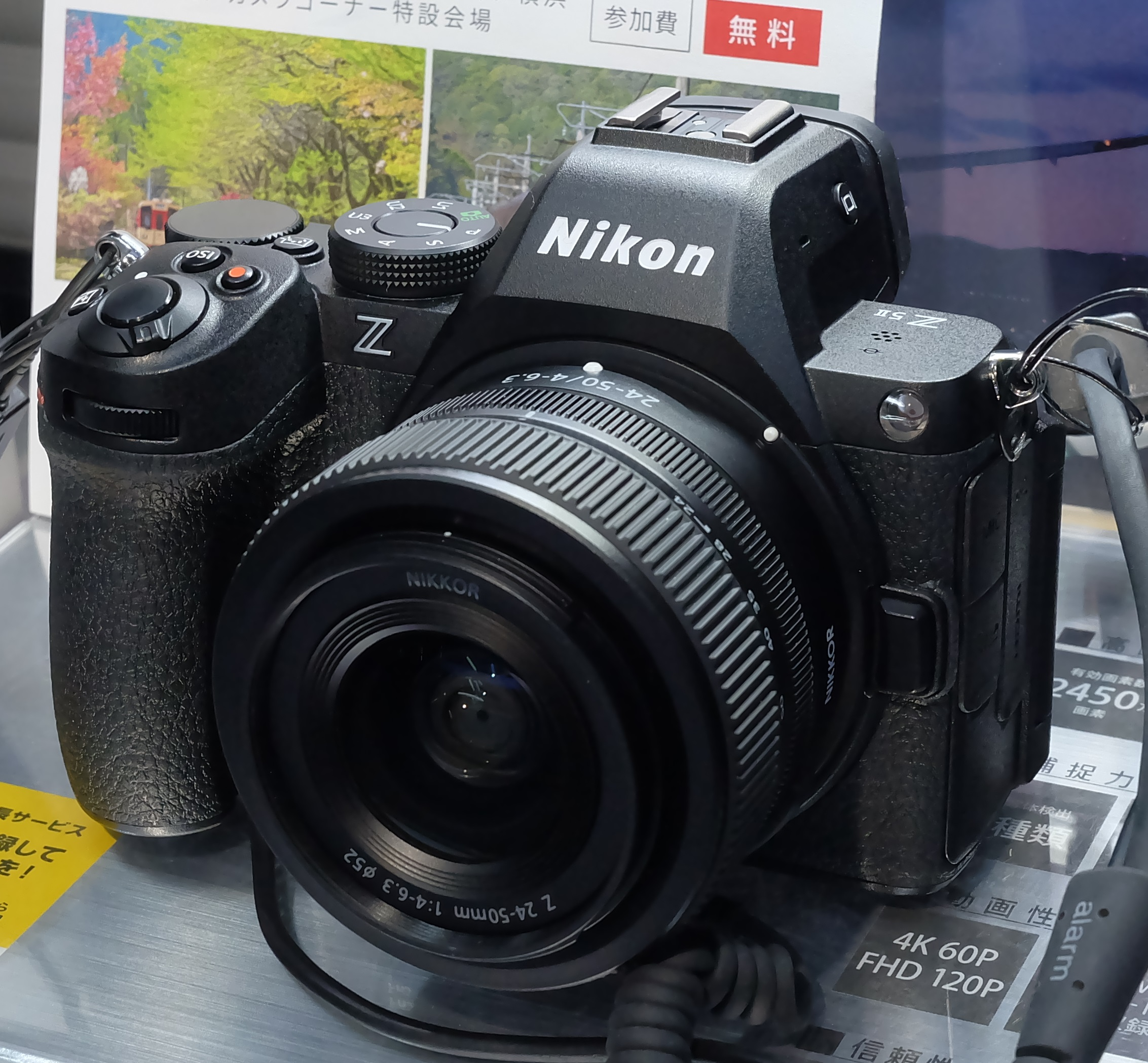
Z5II + Nikkor Z 24-50 mm f/4–6.3

== Awards ==
The camera was awarded with:

- EISA Best Buy Camera 2025-2026 award.
- Videomaker's Best Camera at NAB 2025

== Update history ==
Version	Release date	Notes
1.0	2025-04-03	Initial firmware version
1.01	2025-06-24	For Nikon Imaging Cloud, some of the explanatory texts displayed when connecting were modified (the connection procedure remains unchanged).; Changed the camera name displayed when pairing with SnapBridge.; Changed the camera name displayed on USB-connected devices when [iPhone] was selected for [USB] in the [NETWORK MENU].; Renamed d13 [Display on during burst] in [CUSTOM SETTINGS MENU].
1.02	2025-11-05	For Nikon Imaging Cloud, some messages and default values were changed.; Picture Controls can now be acquired via a new method.; The default for image sensor cleaning was changed to [Clean at shutdown].

== Marketing slogans ==
When the Z5II was launched, Nikon used the following marketing slogans:

- English: “Truly Together.”,
- Japanese: "さあ、どう撮ろう" ("Now, how shall we shoot?")

== Notes ==
Sensor	Class	2018	2019	2020	2021	2022	2023	2024	2025	2026
FX (Full-frame)	Flagship					^{8K} Z9 ^{S}				
FX (Full-frame)	Flagship							^{8K} Z8 ^{S}		
FX (Full-frame)	Professional		^{4K} Z7 ^{S}		^{4K} Z7Ⅱ ^{S}					
FX (Full-frame)	Professional		^{4K} Z6 ^{S}		^{4K} Z6Ⅱ ^{S}				^{6K} Z6Ⅲ ^{S}	
FX (Full-frame)	Cinema									^{6K} ZR ^{S}
FX (Full-frame)	Enthusiast							^{4K} Zf ^{S}		
FX (Full-frame)	Enthusiast				^{4K} Z5 ^{S}					^{4K} Z5Ⅱ ^{S}
FX (Full-frame)	Entry-level									^{4K} Z5ⅡC ^{S}
DX (APS-C)	Enthusiast					^{4K} Zfc				
DX (APS-C)	Prosumer			^{4K} Z50					^{4K} Z50Ⅱ	
DX (APS-C)	Entry-level						^{4K} Z30			
Sensor	Class									
Sensor	Class	2018	2019	2020	2021	2022	2023	2024	2025	2026
