= Nikon Z9 =

2021 full-frame mirrorless camera

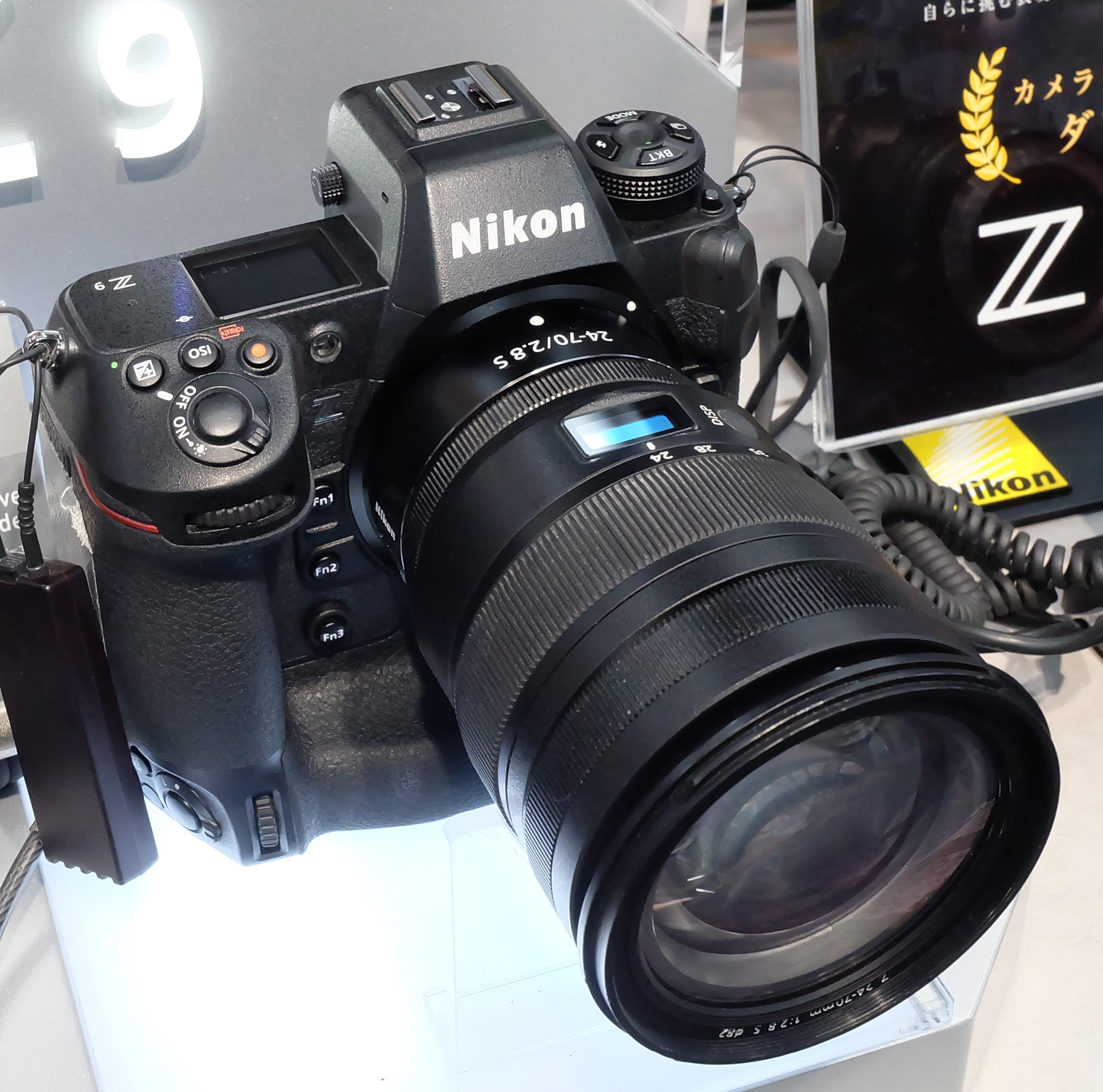
- Nikon Z9 with Nikkor Z 24-70 mm f/2.8 S lens

Overview
- Maker: Nikon
- Type: Full-frame mirrorless interchangeable-lens camera
- Released: 24 December 2021; 4 years ago
- Intro price: JPY 700,000 (body only); USD 5,500

Lens
- Lens mount: Nikon Z-mount

Sensor/medium
- Sensor type: Stacked back-illuminated CMOS sensor
- Sensor size: Full frame (35.9 x 23.9 mm); Nikon FX format
- Sensor maker: Sony
- Maximum resolution: 8,256 × 5,504 (45.7 effective megapixels)
- Film speed: Native range of ISO 64-25,600 (expandable to 32-102,400)
- Recording medium: 2 × CFexpress Type B / XQD

Focusing
- Focus: Single-servo AF (AF-S); Continuous-servo AF (AF-C); Full-time AF (AF-F; only available in video mode); Predictive focus tracking; Manual focus
- Focus modes: Pinpoint AF; Single-point AF^{s}; Dynamic-area AF (S, M, L)^{s}; Wide-area AF (S, L, C1, C2)^{s}; 3D-Tracking^{s} (Note: 3D Tracking is an advanced autofocus mode. When selected, it locks onto a subject by analyzing its shape, contrast, and color. Once locked, this allows the camera to follow it across the frame as either the subject moves or your framing changes.); Auto-area AF^{s}; ^{s} supports Subject Detection
- Focus areas: 493 points (single-point AF) with 90% coverage

Exposure/metering
- Exposure: TTL metering using camera image sensor
- Exposure modes: Programmed Auto [P] with flexible program; Shutter-Priority Auto [S]; Aperture-Priority Auto [A]; Manual [M]
- Exposure metering: TTL metering using camera image sensor Highlight-weighted metering: -3 to +17 EV (ISO 100, f/2.0 lens, 20°C/68°F)
- Metering modes: Matrix metering Center-weighted metering Spot metering Highlight-weighted metering

Flash
- Flash: Built-in: No; Hot shoe
- Flash synchronization: 1/200s (up to 1/8000s using high-speed sync)
- Flash bracketing: 3 or 5 frames up to 3 EV in 1/3 or 1/2 steps

Shutter
- Frame rate: Up to 120 fps in 11 MP continuous (C120), up to 60 fps in 19MP continuous (C60), up to 30 fps at full-resolution with JPEG output (C30), up to 20 fps with RAW output
- Shutter: Electronic shutter
- Shutter speeds: 900s – 1/32000s
- Continuous shooting: 20 fps / 30 fps / 120 fps (expand)

Viewfinder
- Viewfinder: Quad-VGA (1280×960) EVF (3,690,000 dots), 0.8x magnification with 50 mm lens, 3000 nits brightness, 120 Hz refresh rate

Image processing
- Image processor: Expeed 7
- White balance: Auto (3 variants); natural light auto; direct sunlight; cloudy; shade; incandescent; fluorescent (3 variants); flash; manual white point (2500‑10000 K); preset manual (6 variants)
- WB bracketing: 3 or 5 frames up to 3 EV in 1/3 or 1/2 steps

General
- Video recording: 8.3K up to 60 fps in 12-bit N-RAW, 8K up to 30 fps with N-log, 4.1K up to 60 fps in 12-bit ProRes RAW HQ, 4K up to 120 fps, 1080p up to 120 fps
- LCD screen: 3.2-inch vertically and horizontally tilting TFT LCD with 2.1 million dots with touchscreen
- Battery: EN-EL18d; USB-C PD rechargeable (EN-EL18/a/b/c useable with lower battery life)
- Optional accessories: MC-N10 remote grip (fw. 3.00+)
- AV port(s): USB Type-C, HDMI Type-A, 3.5 mm microphone jack, 3.5 mm headphone jack circular 10-pin accessory port
- Data port(s): IEEE 802.11b/g/n/a/ac/Wi-Fi, Bluetooth Low Energy, Gigabit Ethernet
- Body features: In-Body Image Stabilization, GPS receiver
- Dimensions: 149 × 149.5 × 90.5 mm (5.87 × 5.89 × 3.56 in)
- Weight: 1,340 g (47 oz) (with battery, memory card); 1160g (body only)
- Latest firmware: 5.33 / 20 October 2026; 29 days ago
- Made in: Thailand

Chronology
- Predecessor: Nikon D6

The Nikon Z9 is a flagship full-frame mirrorless camera produced by Nikon. The camera was announced on October 28, 2021. It is the eighth Z-mount camera body and the sixth full-frame Z-mount body.

== Image sensor and processor ==
The Z9 has the same 45.7 MP resolution as the Z7 and Z7II cameras, but uses a much faster stacked CMOS sensor which improves autofocus and continuous shooting performance.

The Z9 introduced the EXPEED 7 image processor, which provides an improvement of 10 times over the image processing speed of the EXPEED 6 predecessor, which was used in the previous Nikon full-frame Z6II and Z7II cameras. The continuous shooting capabilities of the Z9 significantly exceed those of Nikon's previous flagship camera, the Nikon D6, while providing more than double the resolution. The Z9 is the first Nikon Z camera to support 8K video, which can be recorded internally at 60 fps in 12-bit N-RAW.

The Z9 is the first flagship full-frame camera without a mechanical shutter.

== Lenses ==
The Z9 uses the Nikon Z-mount, developed by Nikon for its mirrorless digital cameras.

Nikon F-mount lenses can be used, with various degrees of compatibility, via the Nikon FTZ (F-to-Z) and FTZ II mount adapters, although the FTZ II allows for easier vertical shooting.

== Features ==
- "Synchro VR" where both in-body and in-lens image stabilization can stabilize the same axes.
- Advanced autofocus, with subject detection of people, faces, animals, birds, vehicles, and airplanes.
- Burst lengths of over 1000 shots (previous Nikon cameras were limited to at most 200 shots per burst).
- Internal 10-bit video recording in H.264, H.265 and ProRes 422 HQ (also supports HLG and Nikon N-Log).
- Internal 12-bit raw video recording using ProRes RAW HQ (up to 4.1K at 60 fps) and Nikon N-RAW (up to 8.3K at 60 fps) using intoPIX TicoRAW. .
- Video recording length limit extended from 30 minutes to 2 hours and 5 minutes.
- Dedicated "sensor shield" to protect the sensor from dust and dirt when the camera is off or the lens is taken off.
- VR lock to reduce sensor shock during standby.
- 10-pin remote and flash sync connectors.
- Built-in GPS, GLONASS and QZSS receiver for geotagging.
- Allows switching between linear and non-linear focus throw in manual focus with some lenses.
- "Dual-Stream Technology" providing separate paths for capturing images and updating the viewfinder, which eliminates viewfinder blackout and reduces viewfinder lag.
- Supports pre-release capture.

== Z9 generation ==
The Z9 was the first of the so-called "Z9 generation" of Nikon cameras, including the Z8, Zf, Z6III, Z50II, Z5II, and Z5IIC. They all use the Expeed 7 image processor, autofocusing system, a revamped menu structure, button customization options, and video-related features.

== Use in outer space ==
In January 2024, Nikon revealed that NASA launched 13 unmodified Nikon Z9 cameras to the International Space Station (ISS) via the 20th Northrop Grumman commercial resupply services mission. The new Nikon Z9s replaced the aging high-end Nikon D5 and D6 DSLRs on board the ISS.

On February 29, 2024, NASA revealed a signed agreement between them and Nikon to develop the Handheld Universal Lunar Camera (HULC) as the first handheld camera to be used on the Moon, for use beginning with the Artemis III mission. The resulting design consists of a modified Z9 camera with thermal shielding, custom grip with modified buttons, and modified electrical components to minimize issues caused by solar radiation.

On the Artemis II mission, in addition to Nikon D5s, a Z9 was included for testing. As described by Artemis II Commander Reid Wiseman, “That’s the camera that they’ll be using, the crew will be using on Artemis III plus, so we were fighting really hard to get that on the vehicle to test out in a high-radiation environment in deep space.”

Nikon Corporation and NASA share a long history together with Nikon being the camera brand that continuously supplies the agency with modified cameras since the 1970s.

== Gallery ==
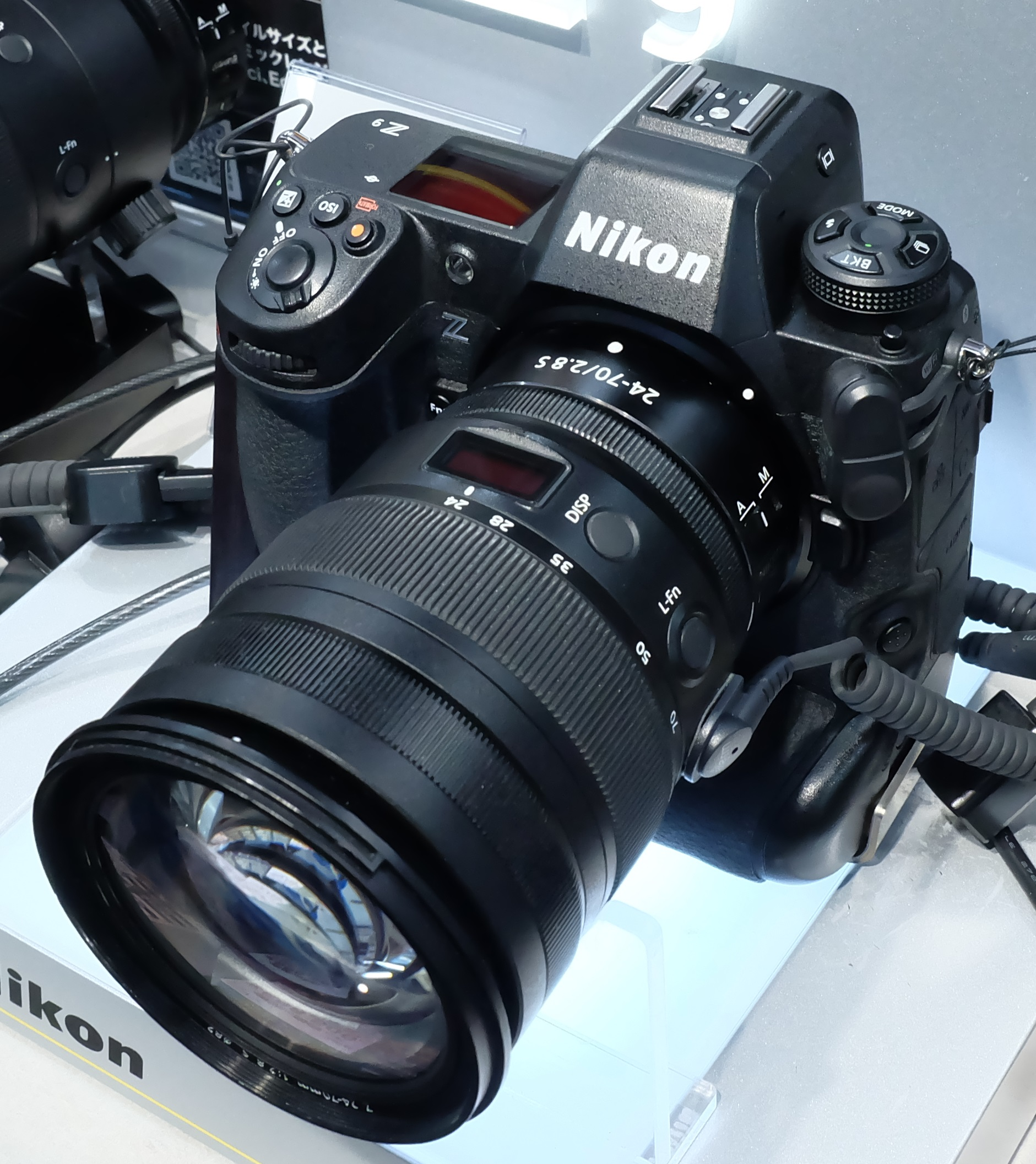
Z9 + Nikkor Z 24-70 mm f/2.8 S

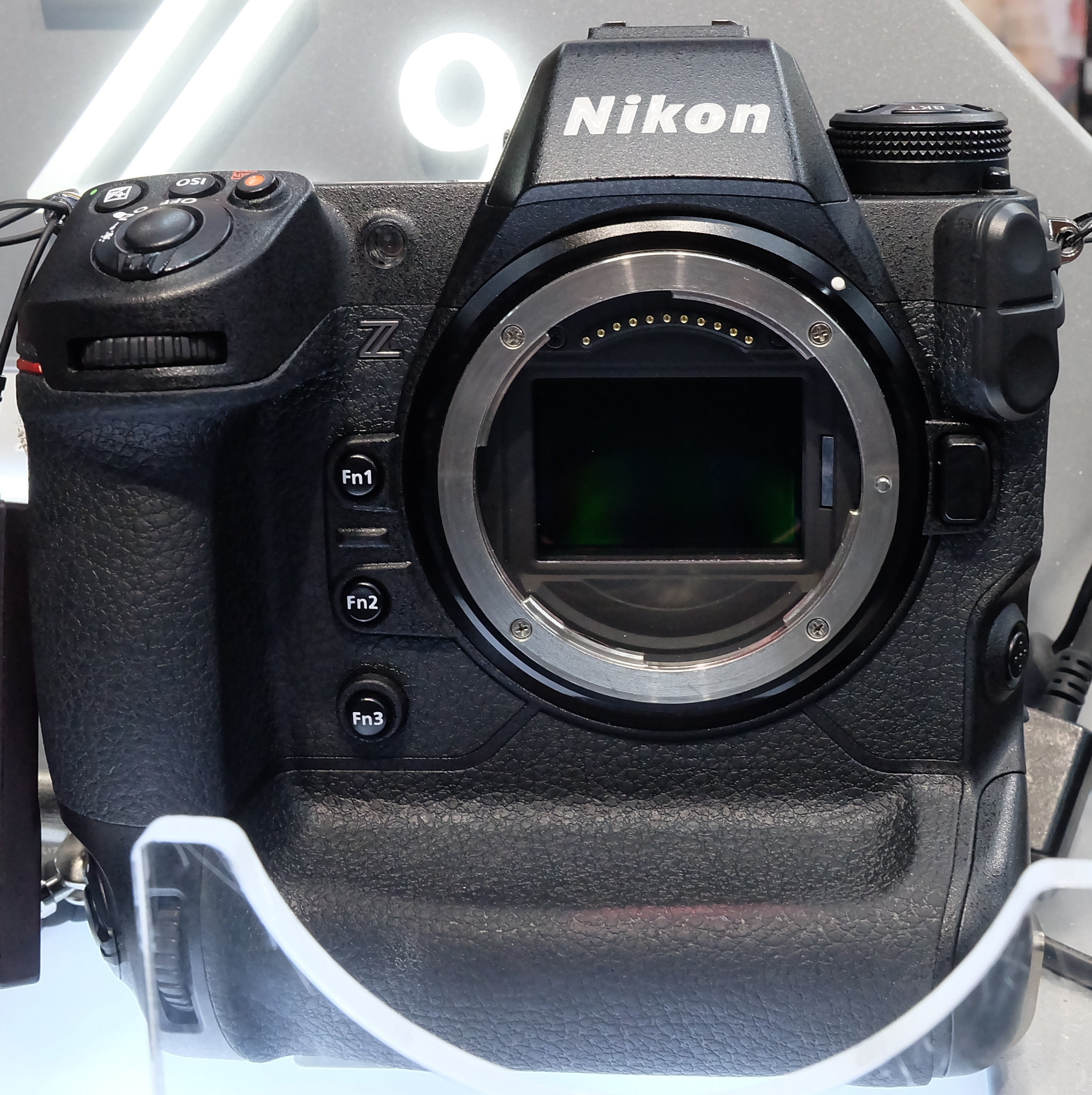
Sensor, with sensor shield not engaged

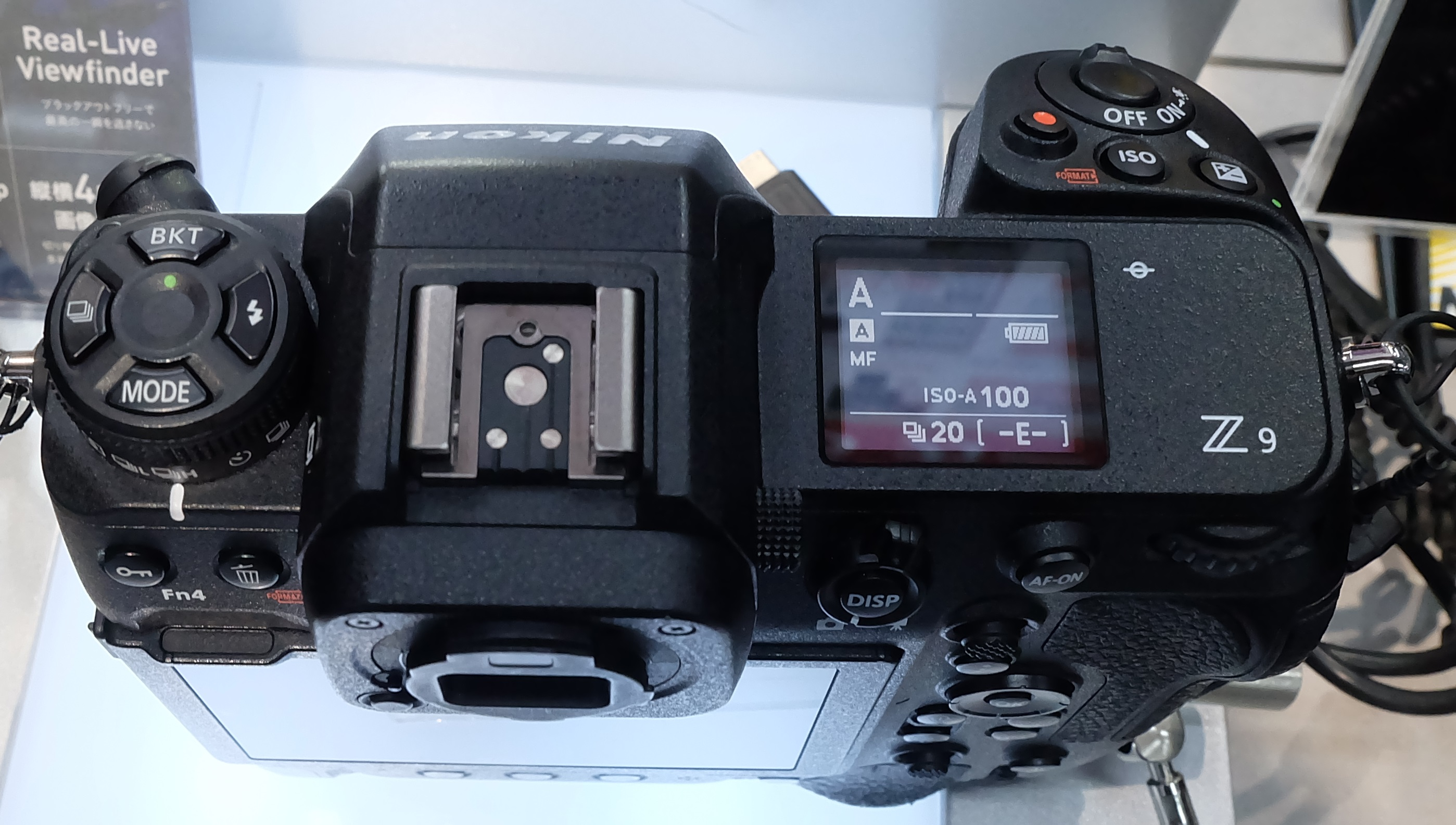
Top controls and top screen

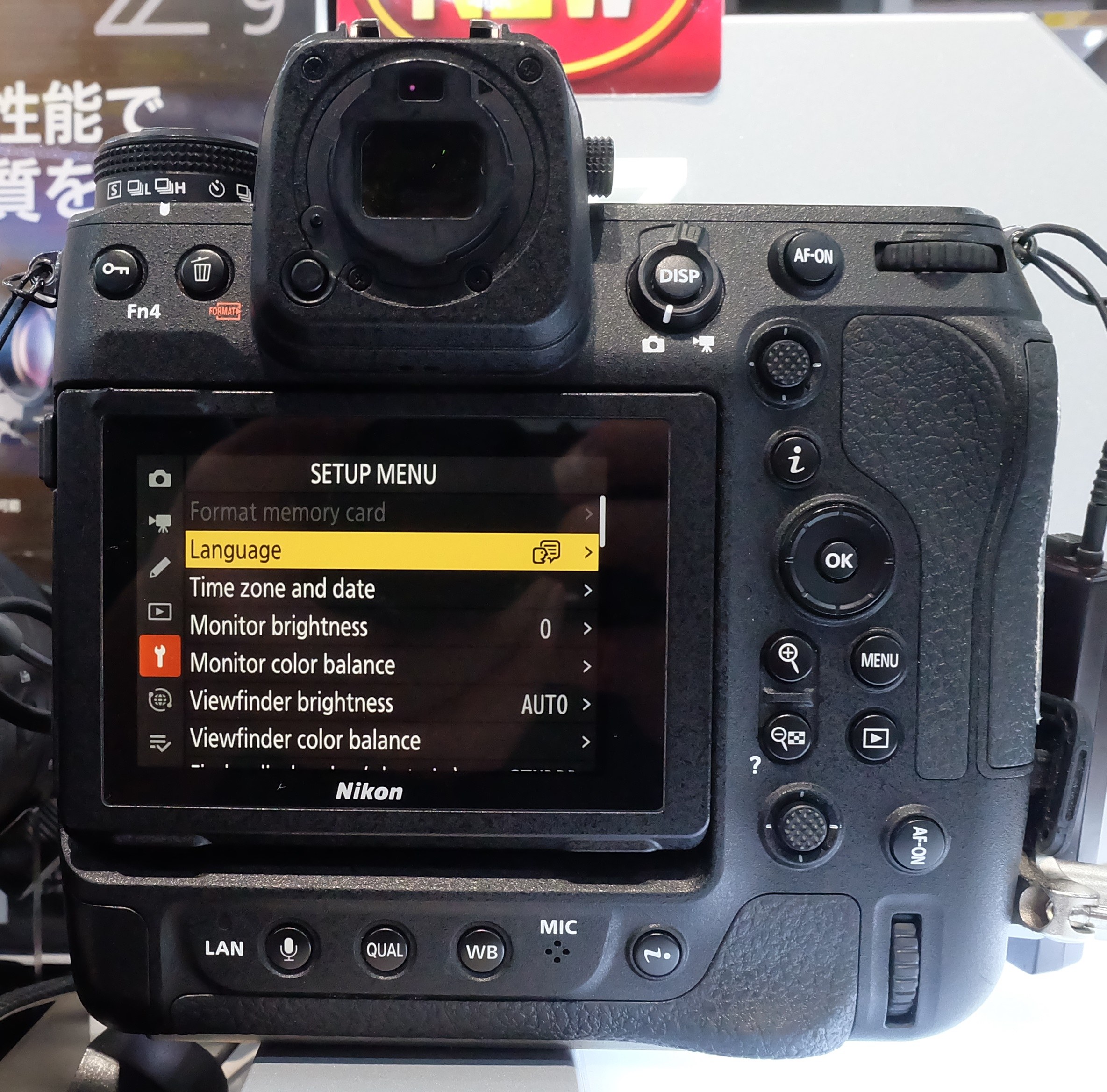

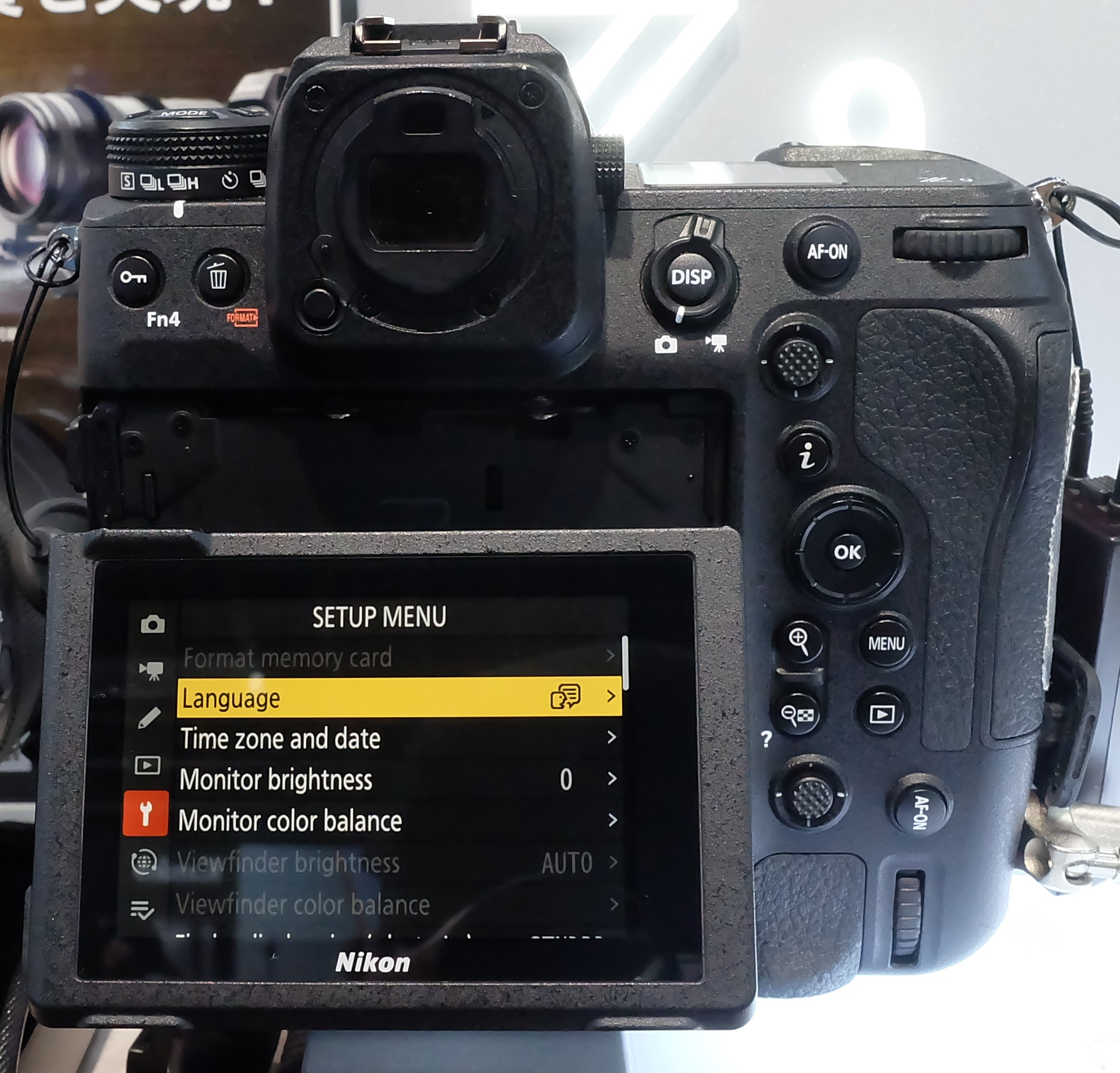
Main display in a tilted orientation

== Awards ==
The Z9 has won numerous awards:

- Camera Grand Prix 2022 Camera of the Year
- Camera Grand Prix 2022 Readers Award.
- Best of the Best: 2022 Red Dot Product Design Award
- Camera of the Year: EISA Awards 2022-2023
- DPReview Awards 2021 Product of the Year
- DPReview Gold Award & Highest Ever Score
- 2022 TIPA World Awards: Best Full-Frame Professional Camera
- RedDot Product Design Awards 2022: Best of the Best
- iF Design Award 2022

== Update history ==
The Z9 has had its functionality augmented many times. For details of the various firmware updates, refer to the official Nikon website.

== Marketing slogans ==
When the Z9 was launched, Nikon used the marketing slogan: “Unstoppable.”

== Notes ==
Sensor	Class	2018	2019	2020	2021	2022	2023	2024	2025	2026
FX (Full-frame)	Flagship					^{8K} Z9 ^{S}				
FX (Full-frame)	Flagship							^{8K} Z8 ^{S}		
FX (Full-frame)	Professional		^{4K} Z7 ^{S}		^{4K} Z7Ⅱ ^{S}					
FX (Full-frame)	Professional		^{4K} Z6 ^{S}		^{4K} Z6Ⅱ ^{S}				^{6K} Z6Ⅲ ^{S}	
FX (Full-frame)	Cinema									^{6K} ZR ^{S}
FX (Full-frame)	Enthusiast							^{4K} Zf ^{S}		
FX (Full-frame)	Enthusiast				^{4K} Z5 ^{S}					^{4K} Z5Ⅱ ^{S}
FX (Full-frame)	Entry-level									^{4K} Z5ⅡC ^{S}
DX (APS-C)	Enthusiast								^{4K} Z50Ⅱ	
DX (APS-C)	Enthusiast					^{4K} Zfc				
DX (APS-C)	Prosumer			^{4K} Z50						
DX (APS-C)	Entry-level						^{4K} Z30			
Sensor	Class									
Sensor	Class	2018	2019	2020	2021	2022	2023	2024	2025	2026
