= Nikon Nikkor Z 24-70 mm f/2.8 S =

Nikkor Z 24-70 mm f/2.8 S
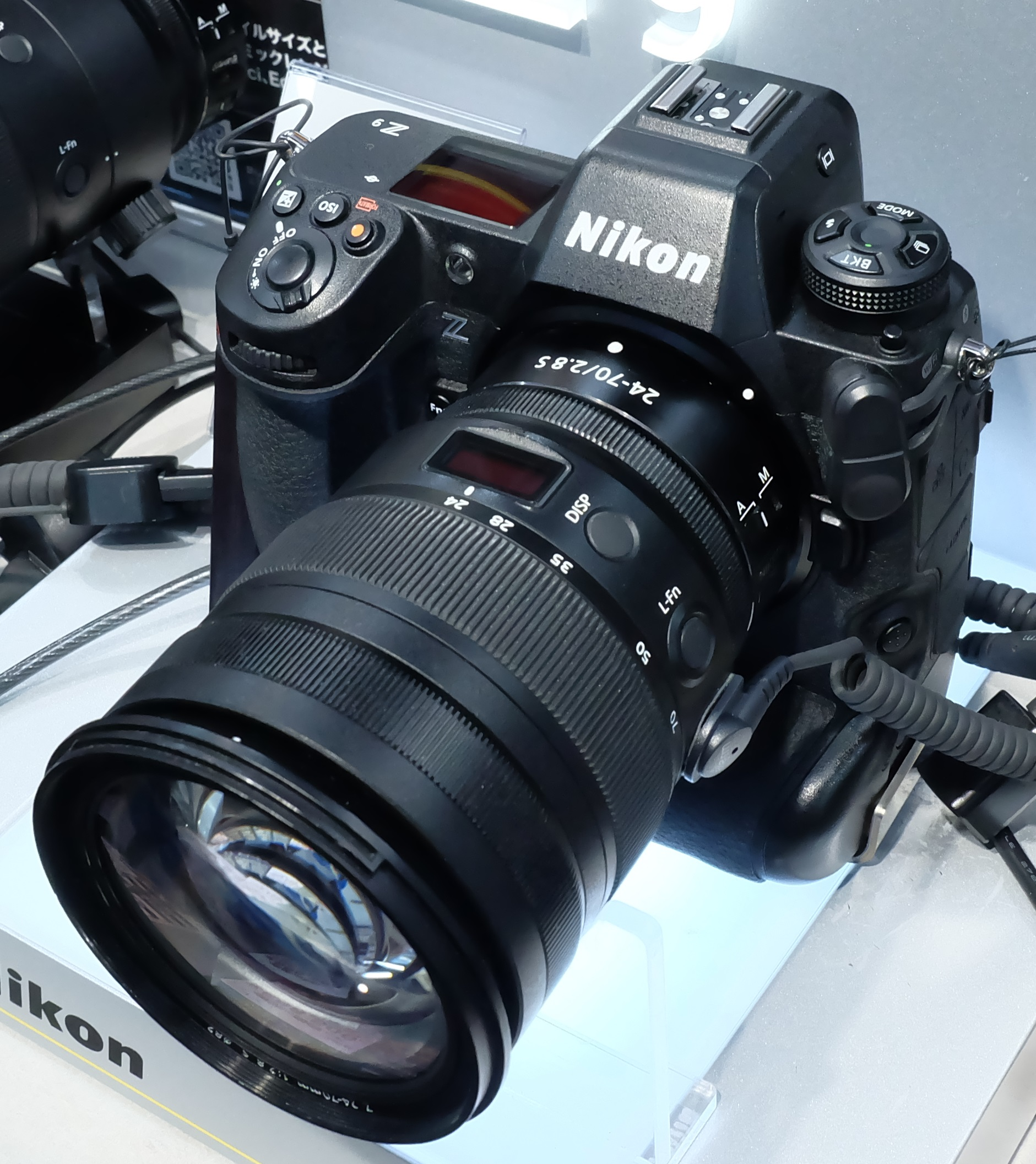
- The lens mounted on a Nikon Z9
- Maker: Nikon
- Lens mount: Z-mount

Technical data
- Type: Zoom
- Focus drive: Stepping motor
- Focal length: 24-70mm
- Image format: FX (full frame)
- Aperture (max/min): f/2.8–22
- Close focus distance: 0.38m
- Max. magnification: 1:4.5
- Diaphragm blades: 9 (rounded)
- Construction: 17 elements in 15 groups

Features
- Lens-based stabilization: No No
- Macro capable: No No
- Unique features: S-Line lens Nano Crystal Coat and ARNEO Coat elements Fluorine Coat; OLED screen
- Application: Standard zoom

Physical
- Max. length: 126 mm
- Diameter: 89 mm
- Weight: 805 g
- Filter diameter: 82 mm

Software
- Latest firmware: 1.20 (as of 20 August 2022)
- User flashable: Yes Yes
- Lens ID: 13

Accessories
- Lens hood: HB-87 (bayonet)
- Case: CL-C2

Angle of view
- Diagonal: 84°–34°20' (FX); 61°–22°50' (DX)

History
- Introduction: February 2019
- Successor: Nikon Nikkor Z 24-70 mm f/2.8 S II

Retail info
- MSRP: 2299 USD (as of 2019)

The Nikon Nikkor Z 24-70 mm f/2.8 S is a full-frame standard zoom lens with a constant aperture of f/2.8, manufactured by Nikon for use on Nikon Z-mount mirrorless cameras.

It was succeeded by the Nikkor Z 24-70 mm f/2.8 S II, announced on August 22, 2025.

== Introduction ==
The lens was introduced on February 14, 2019. The lens comes with a bayonet-type lens hood (HB-87).

The lens achieved a DXOMark score of 36.

== Features ==
- 24-70 mm focal length (approximately equivalent field of view of a 36-105 mm lens when used on a DX format camera)
- S-Line lens
- Autofocus using a stepping motor (STM), dedicated focus-by-wire manual focus ring
- 17 elements in 15 groups (including 2 ED glass, 4 aspherical lens elements, elements with Nano Crystal and ARNEO coats, and a fluorine-coated front lens element)
- 9-blade rounded diaphragm
- Internal focusing (IF lens)
- Multi-function OLED display ("lens information panel"), capable of showing aperture, focus distance and depth of field information
- One customizable control ring at the back (aperture, ISO and exposure compensation functions can be assigned to it)
- One L-Fn customizable function button
- A/M switch for autofocus/manual focus modes
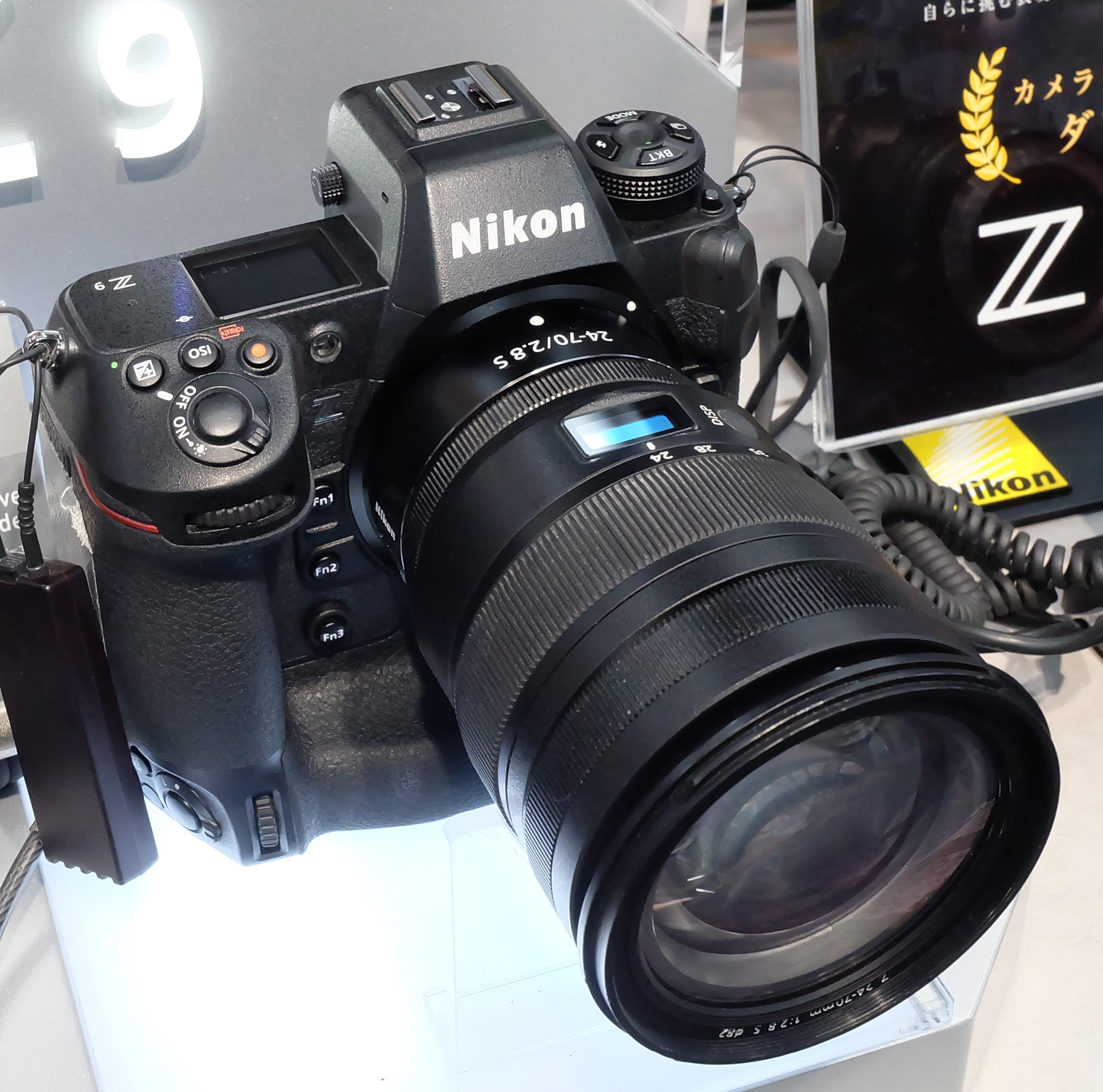
On a Nikon Z9, without lens hood

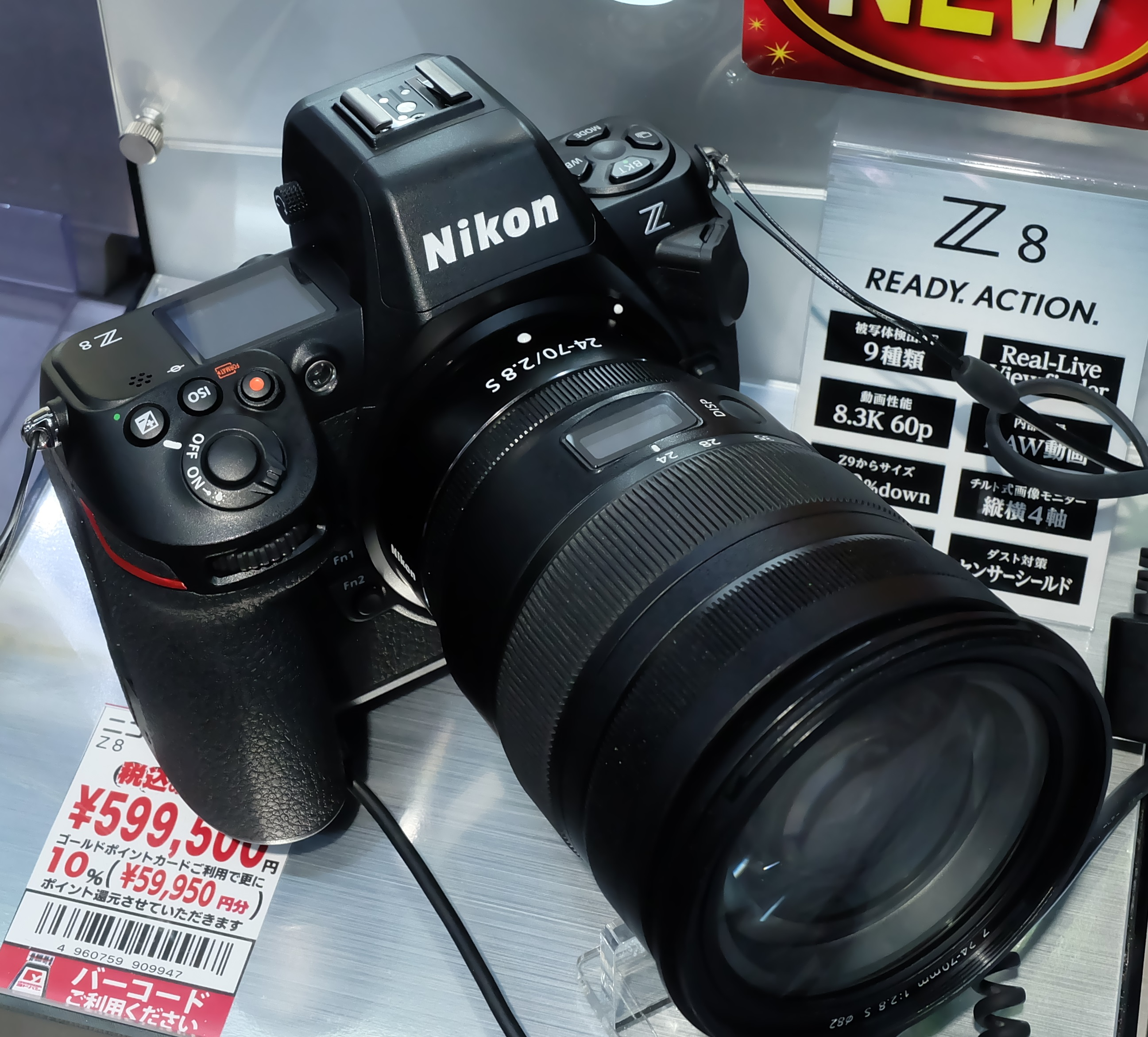
On a Z8, without lens hood

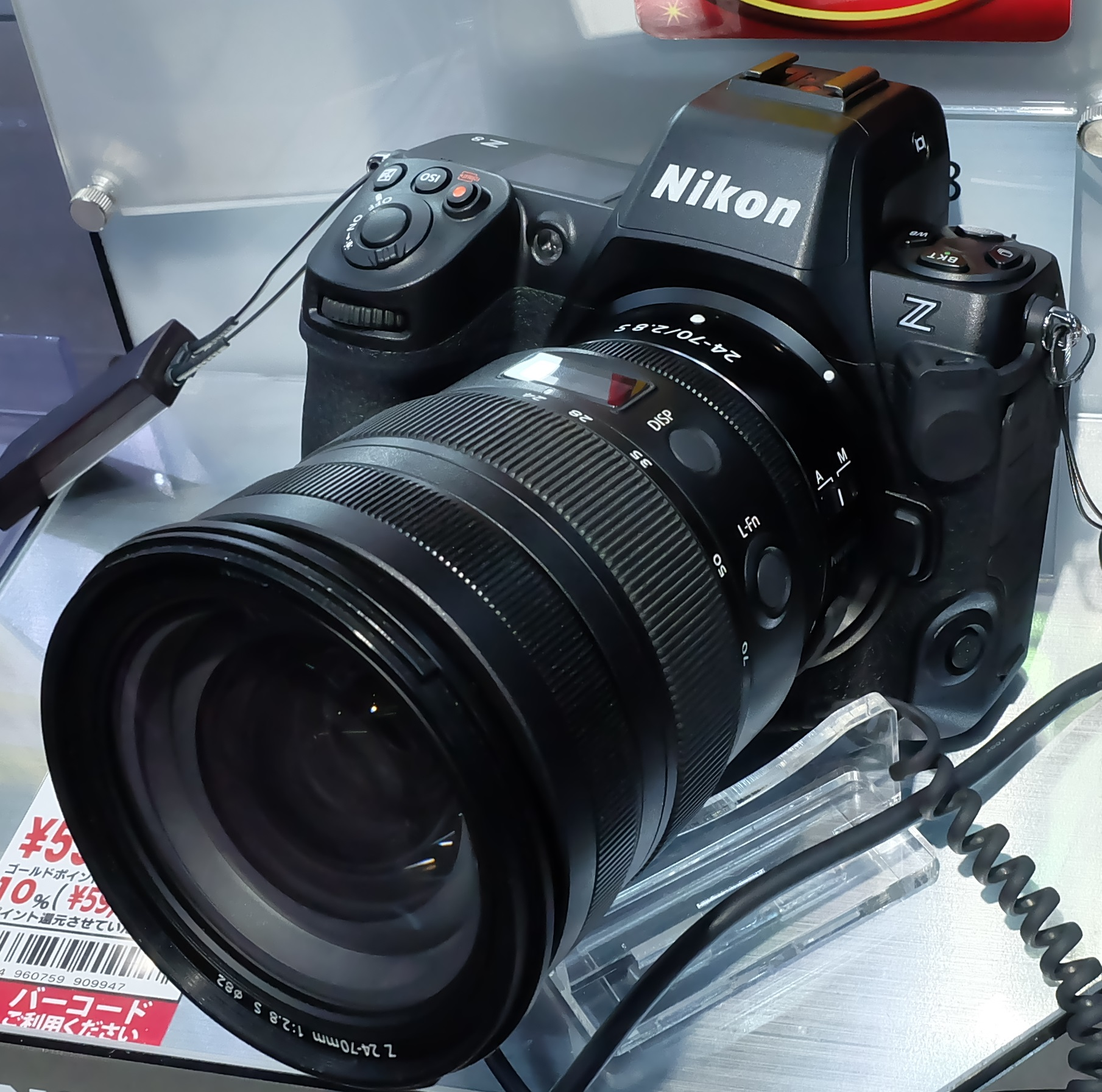

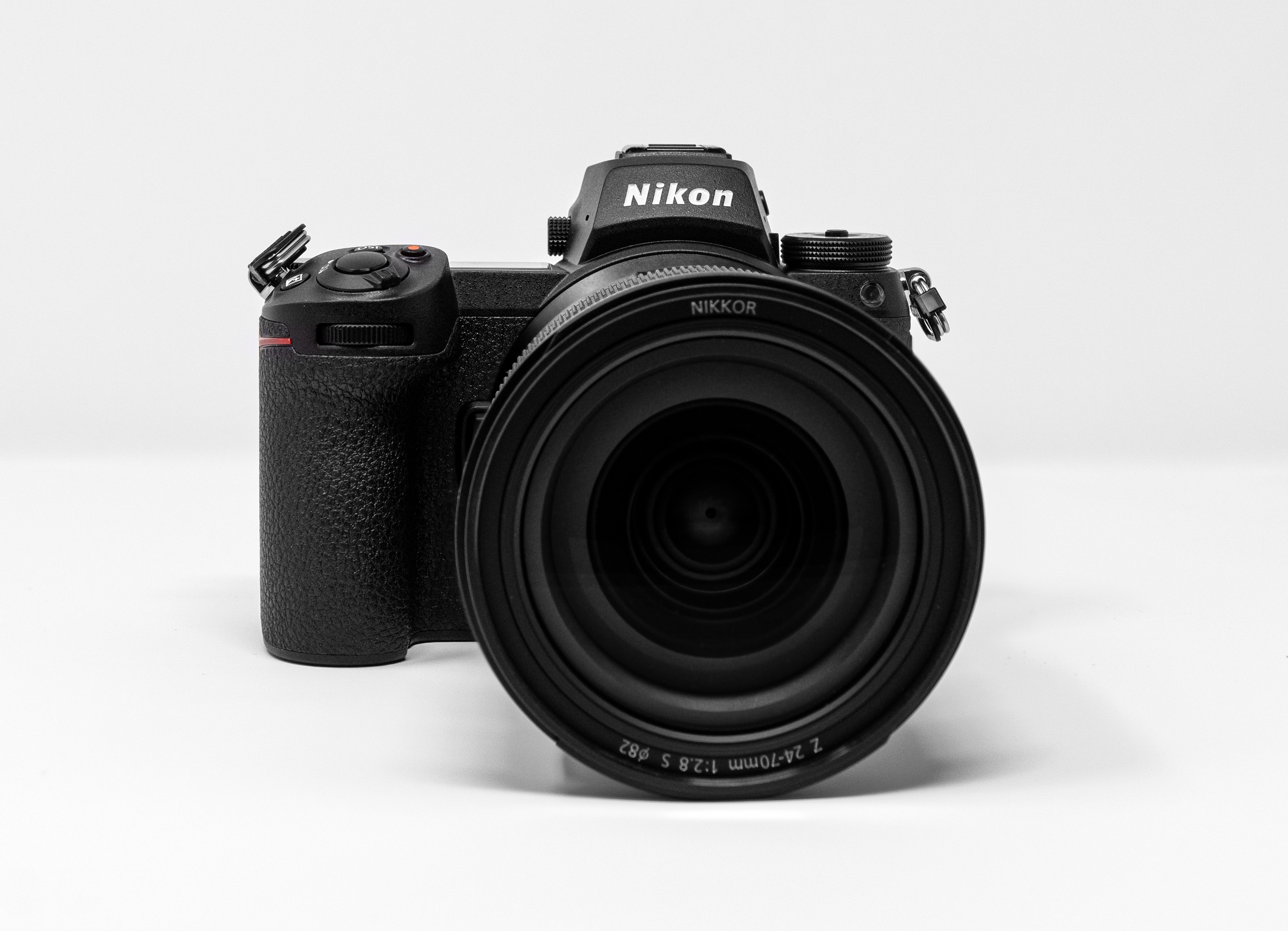
On a Z7II, front element

== Sample images ==
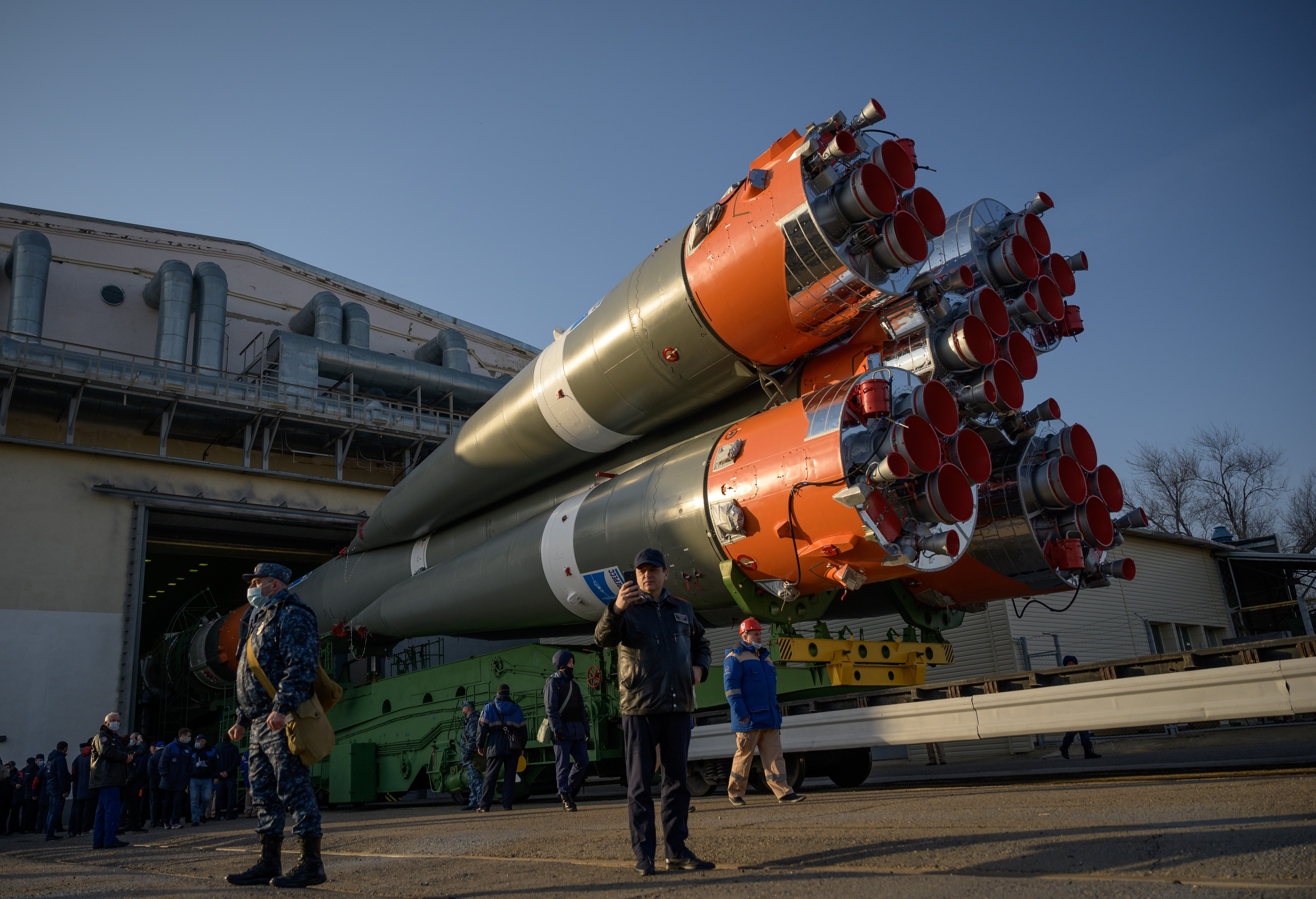
At 24 mm, f/2.8

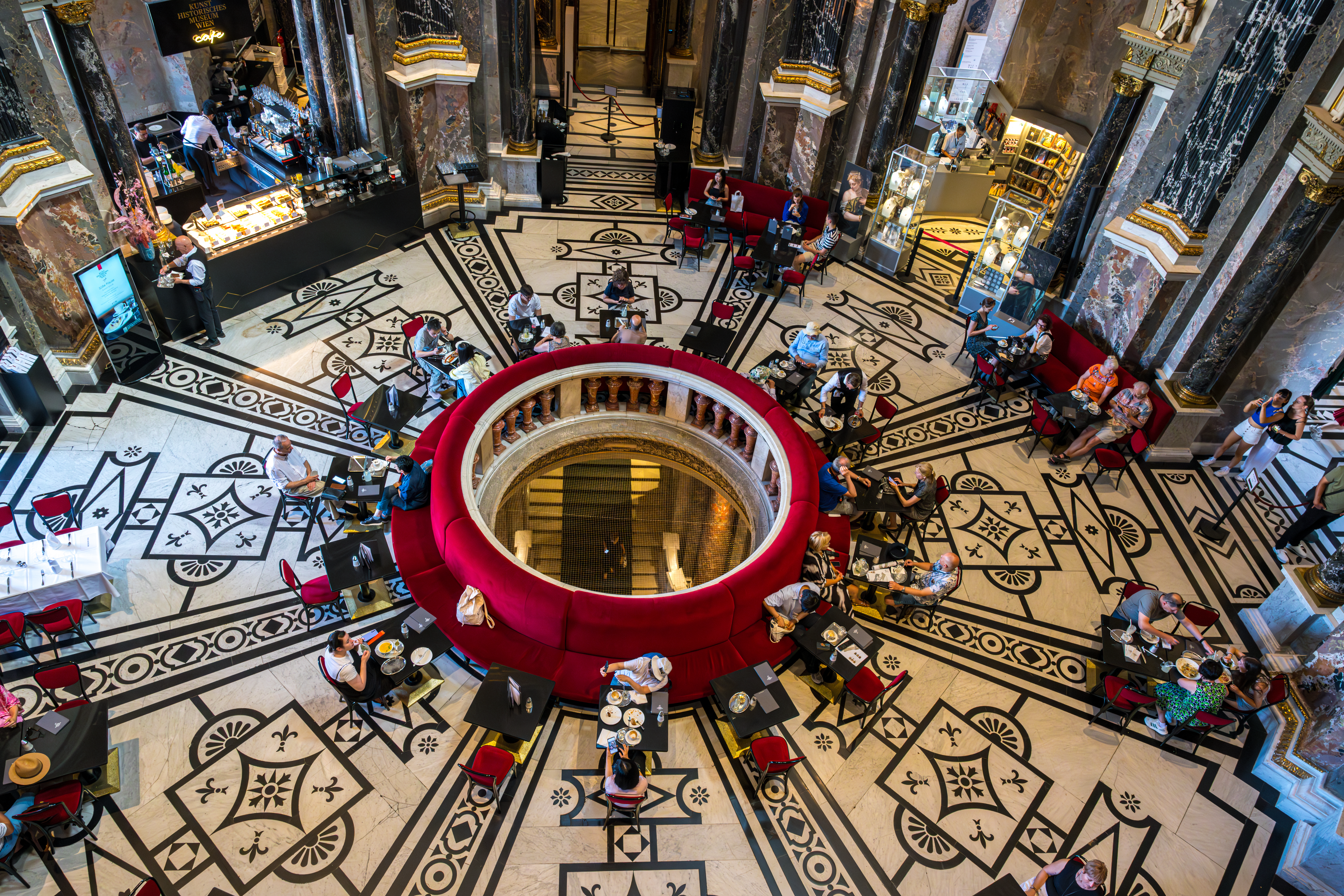
At 24 mm, f/5.6

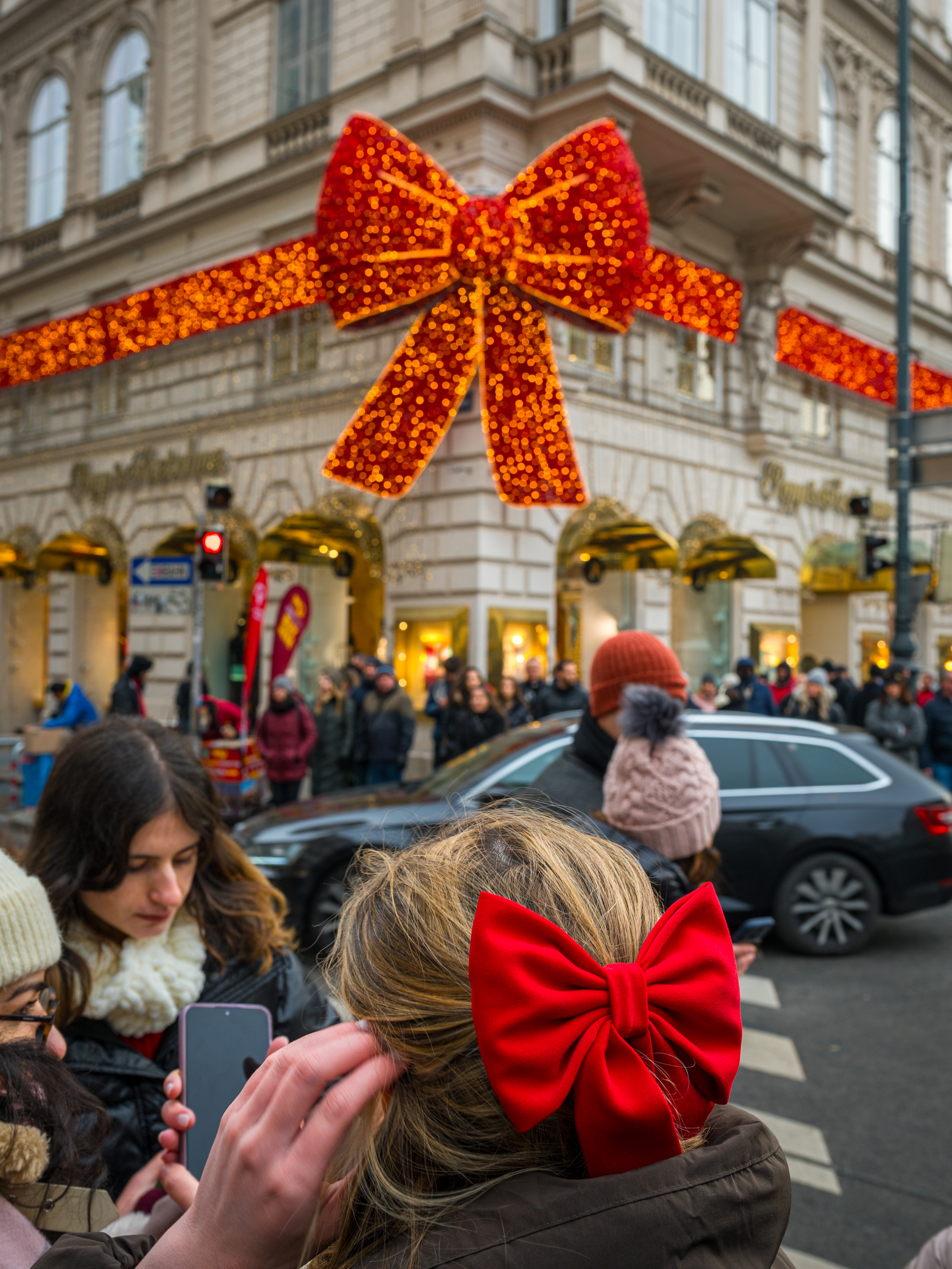
At 24 mm, f/5.6

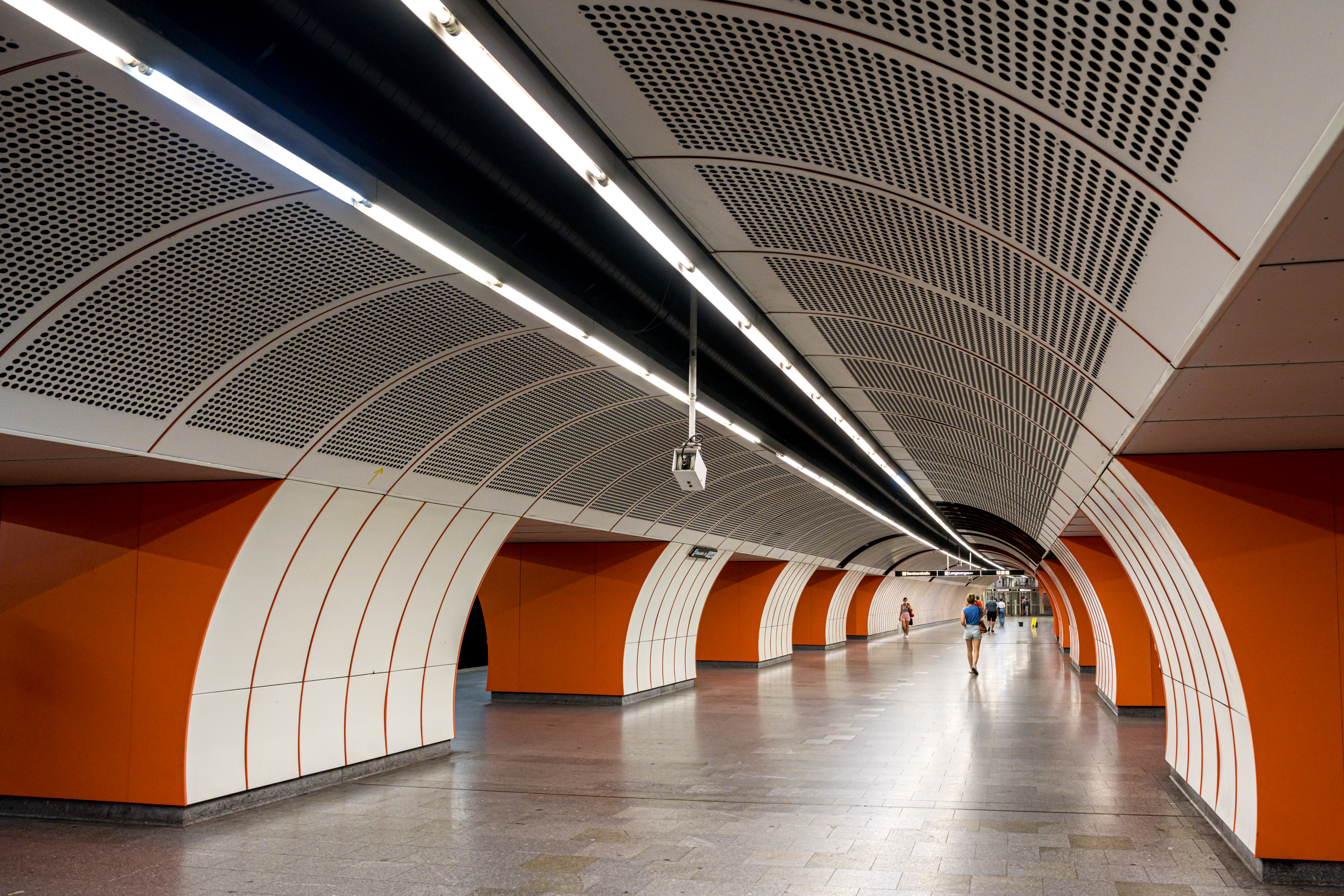
At 24 mm, f/6.3

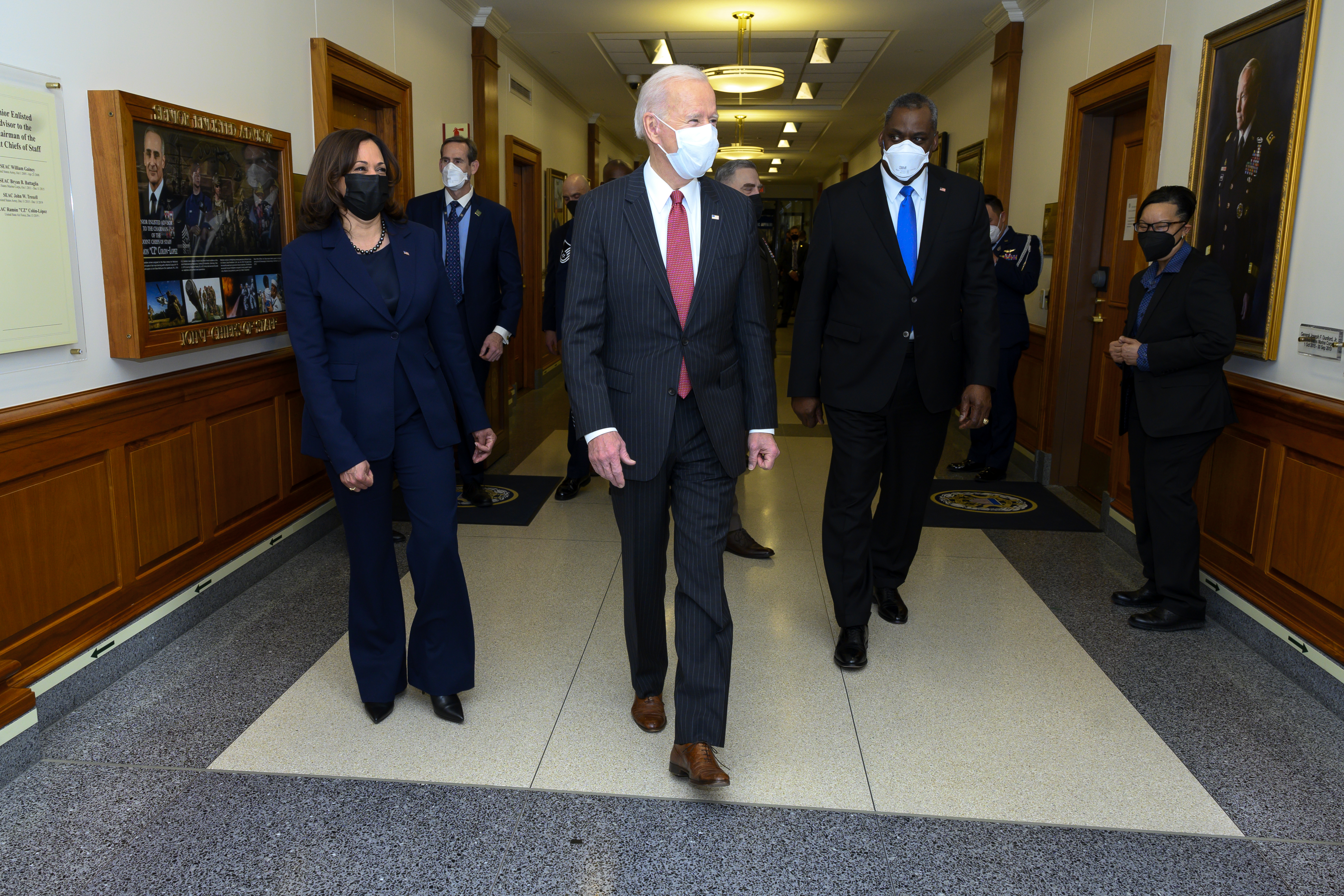
At 24 mm, f/6.3

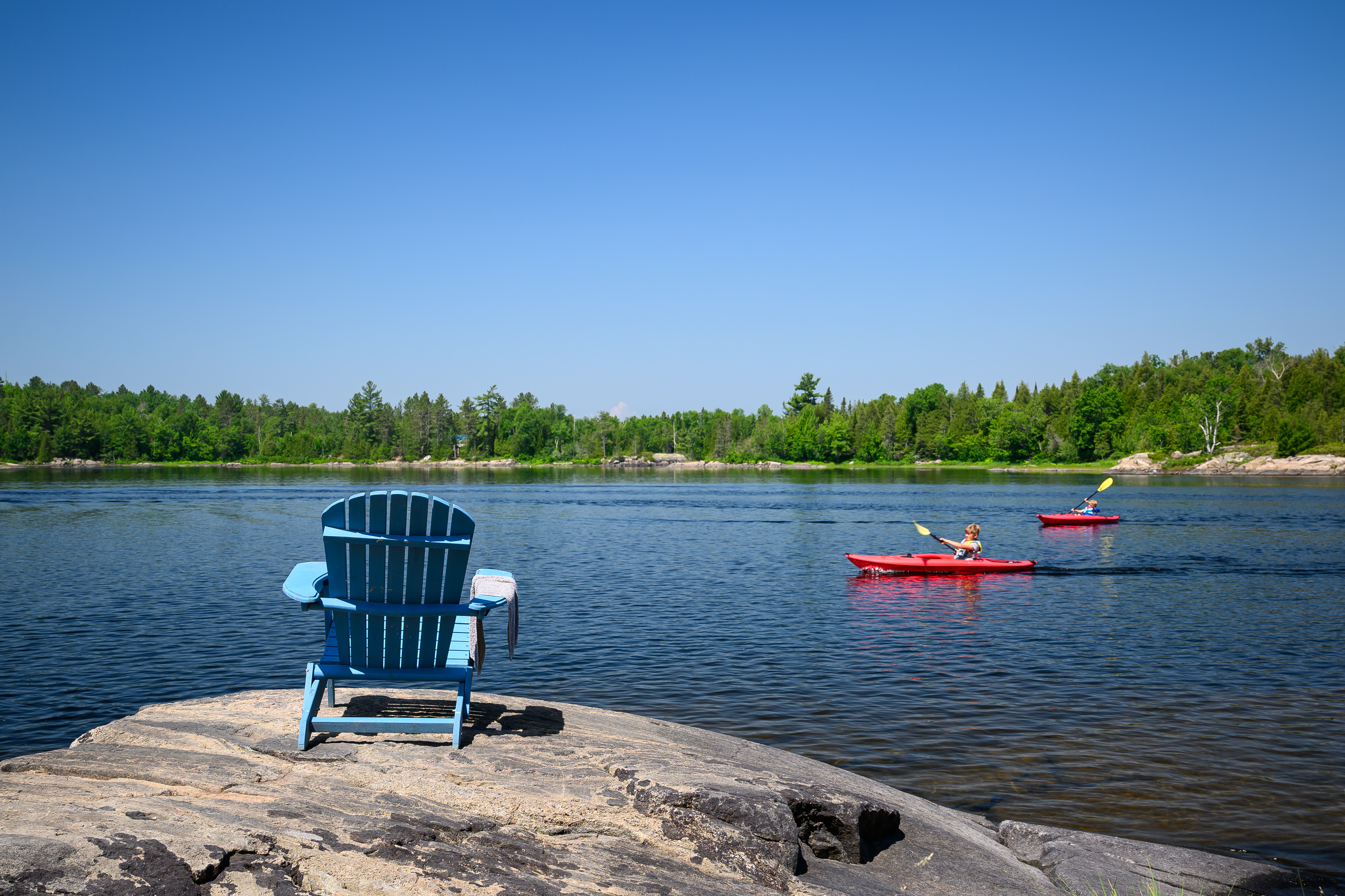
At 24 mm, f/6.3

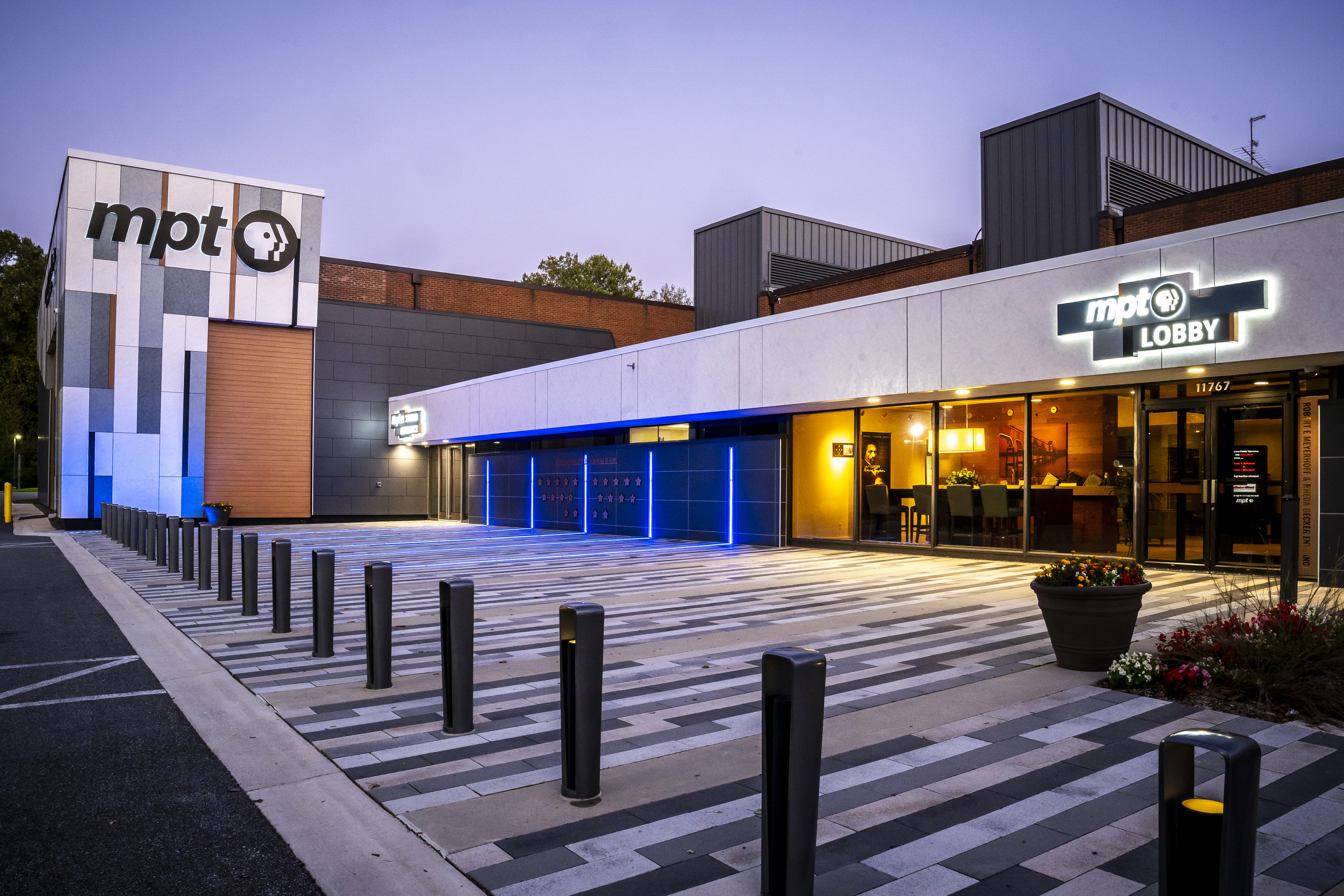
At 24 mm, f/13

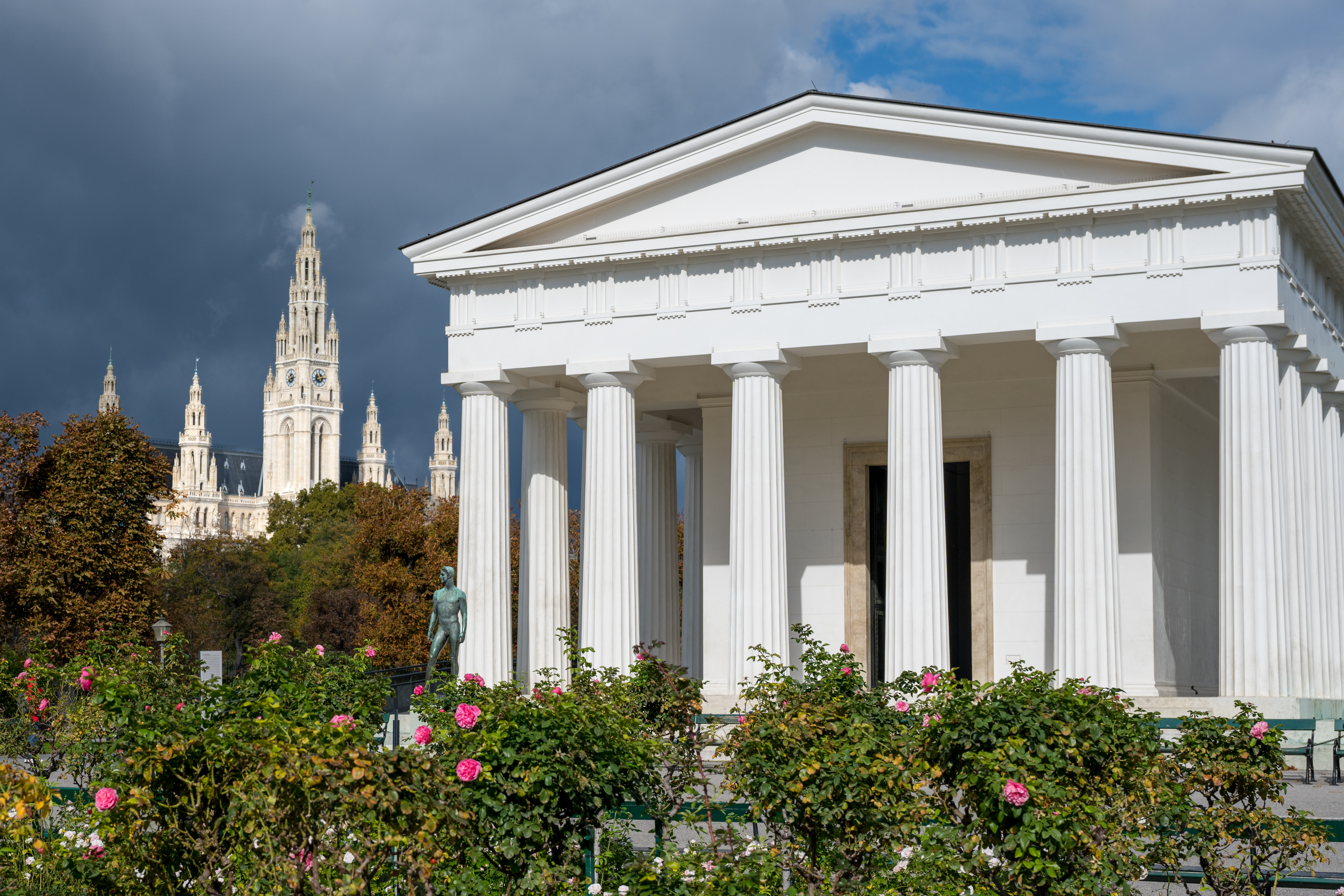
At 38 mm, f/5.6

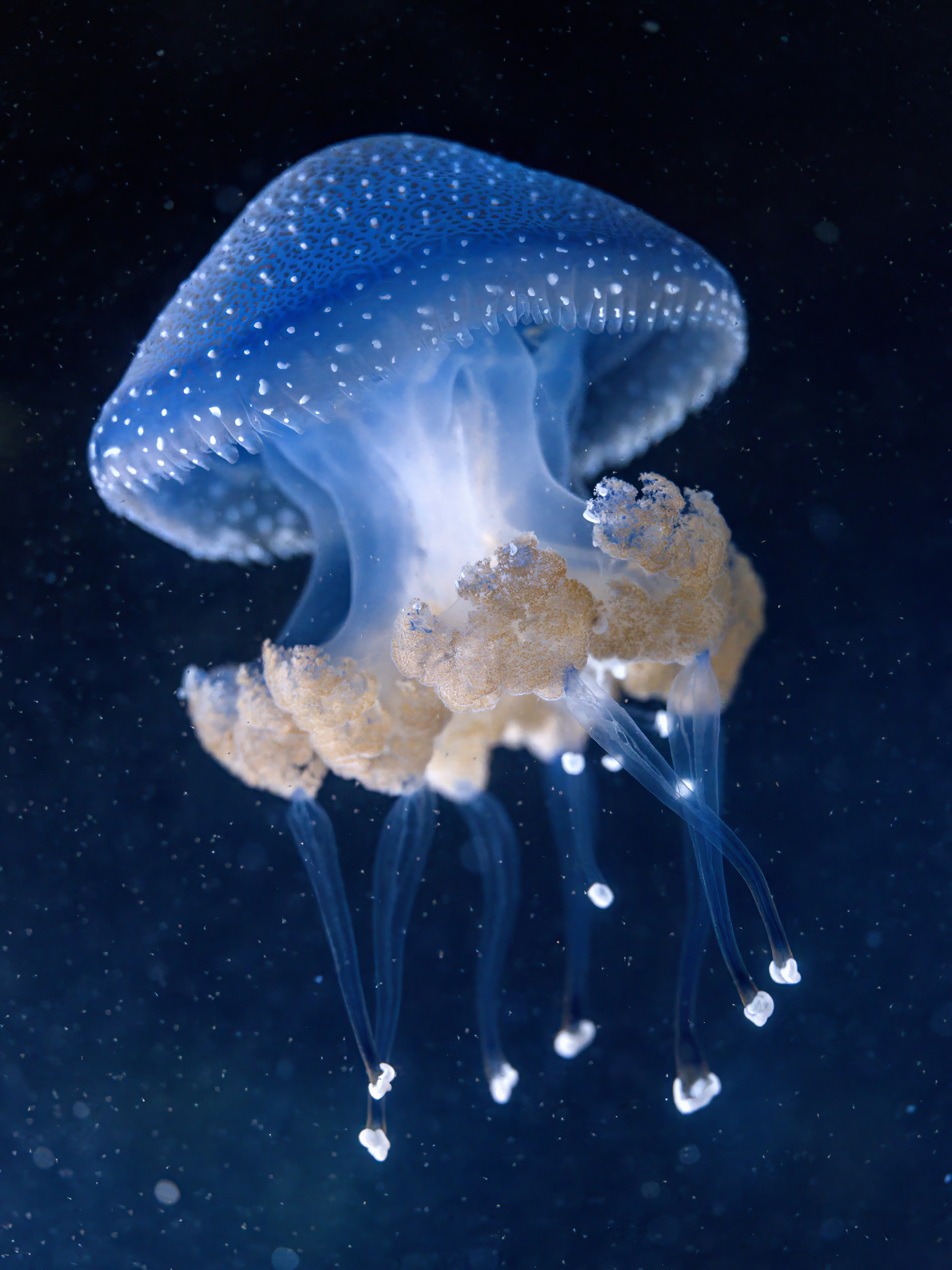
At 49 mm, f/3.5

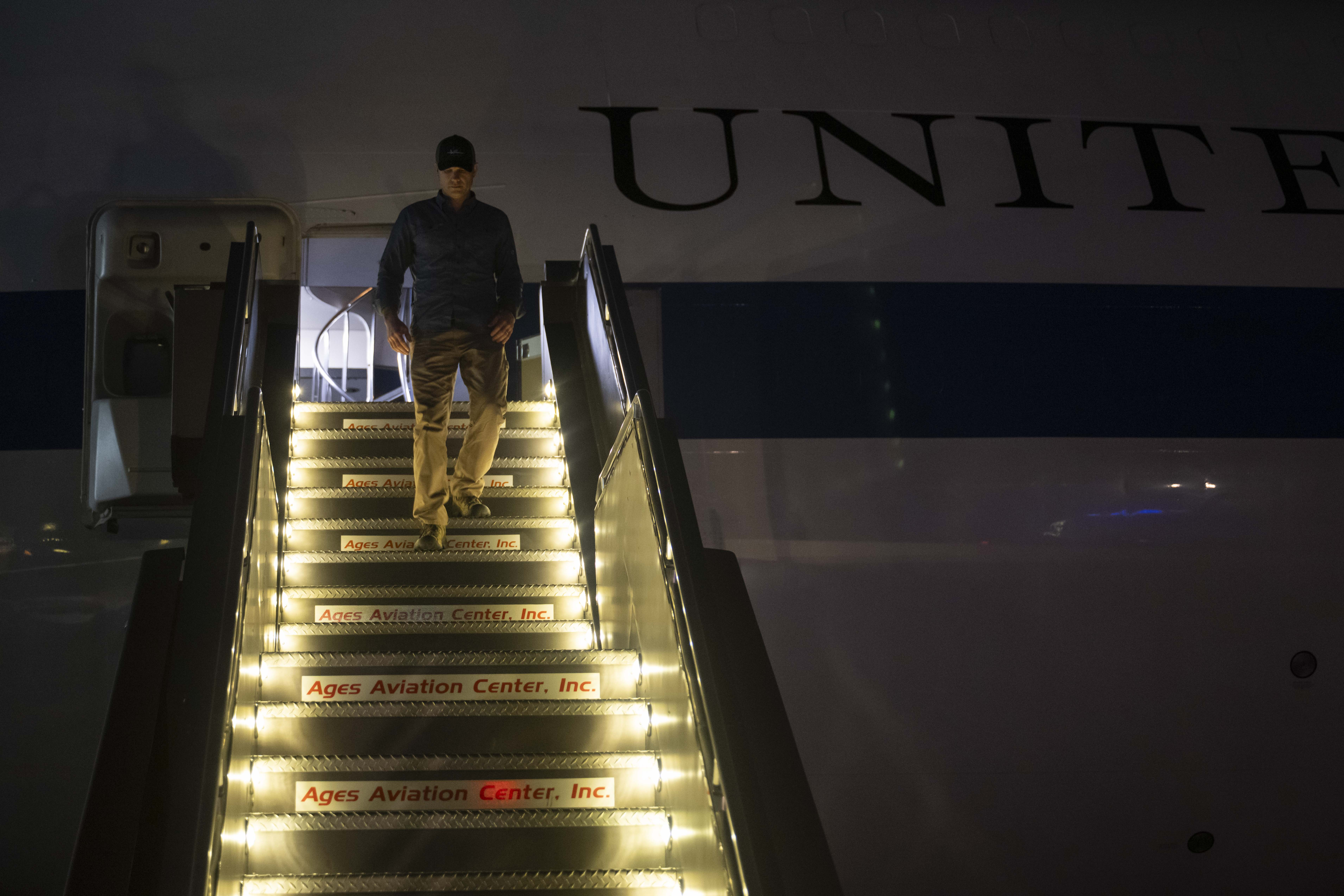
At 58 mm, f/2.8

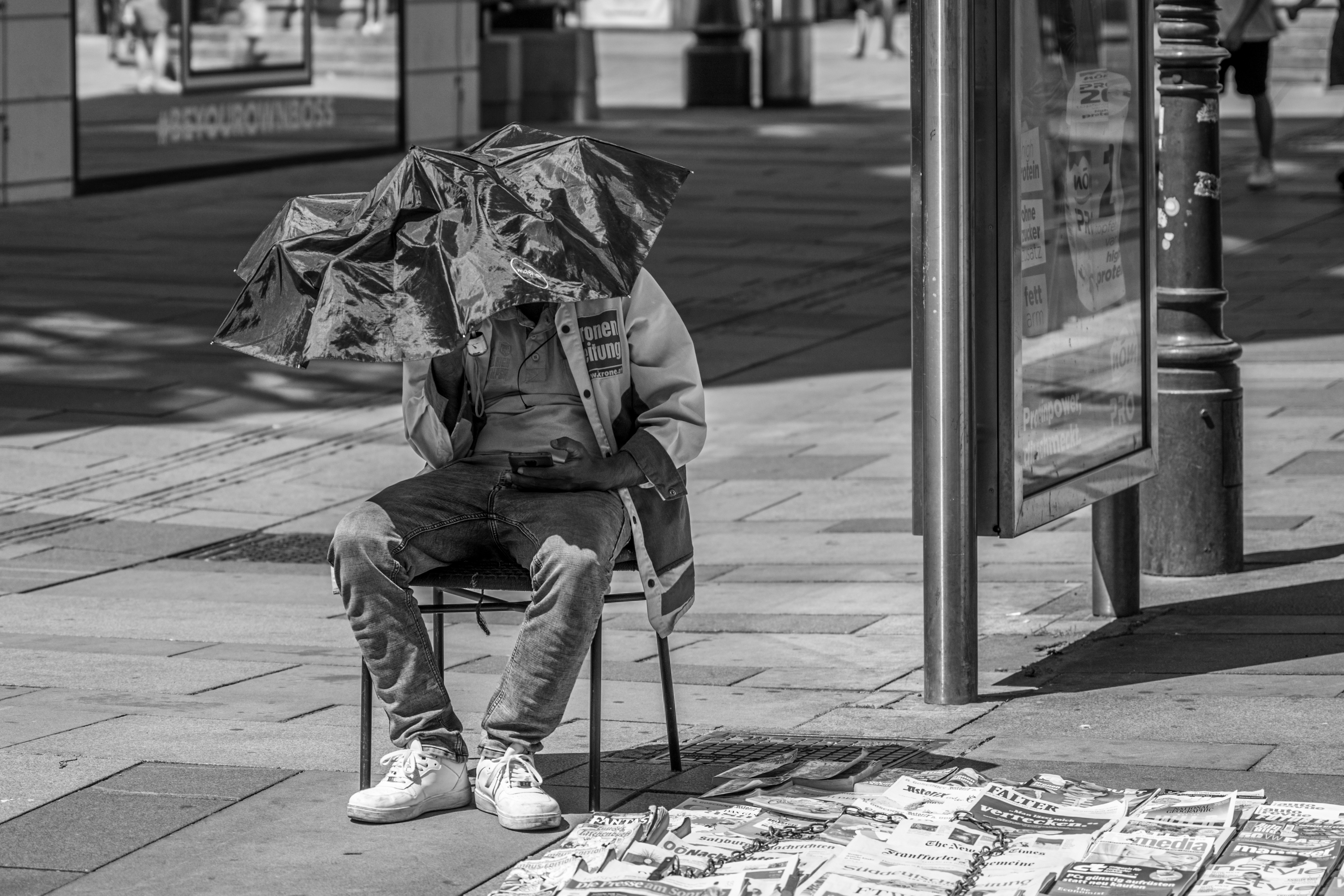
At 70 mm, f/2.8

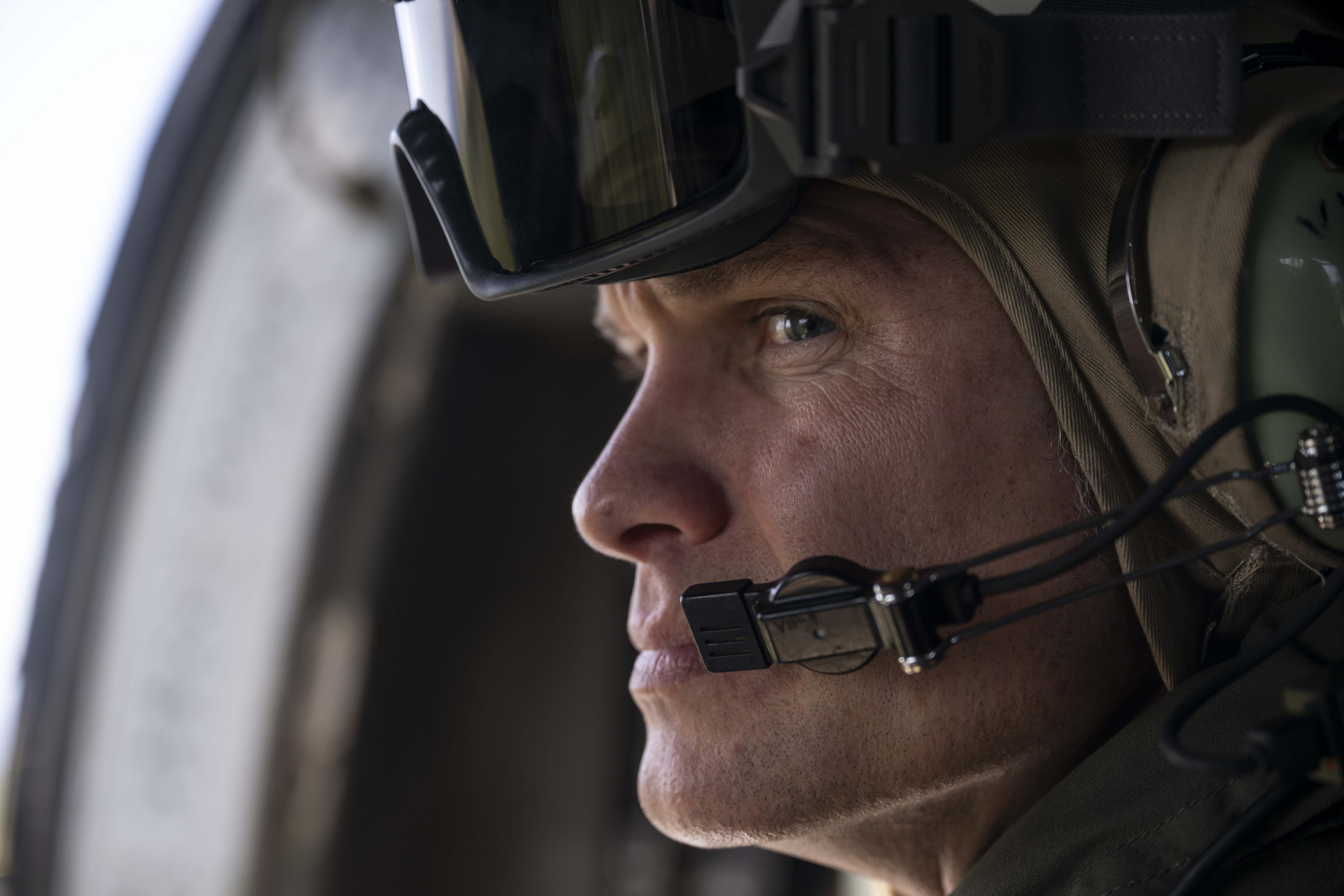
At 70 mm, f/3.5

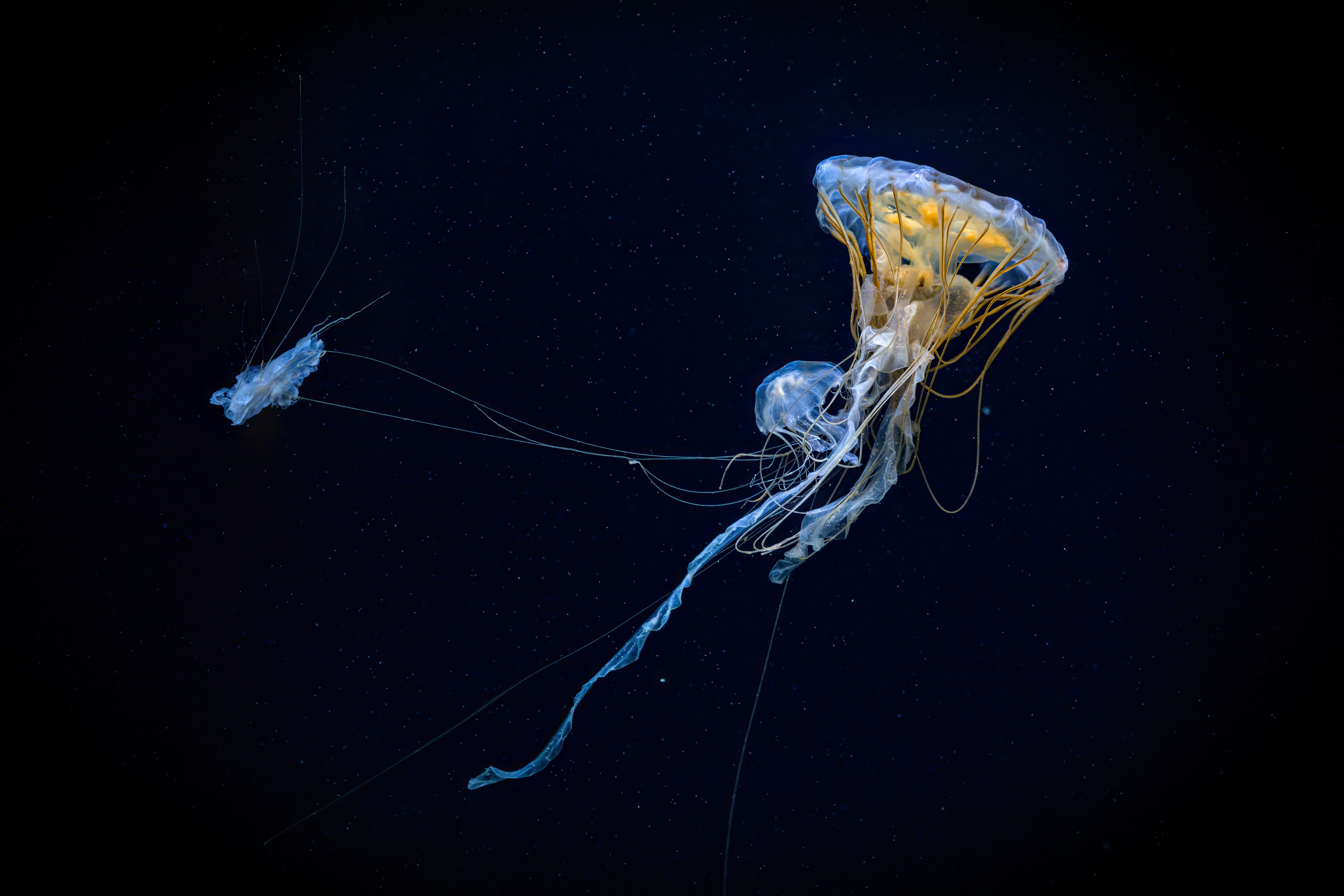
At 70 mm, f/4.5

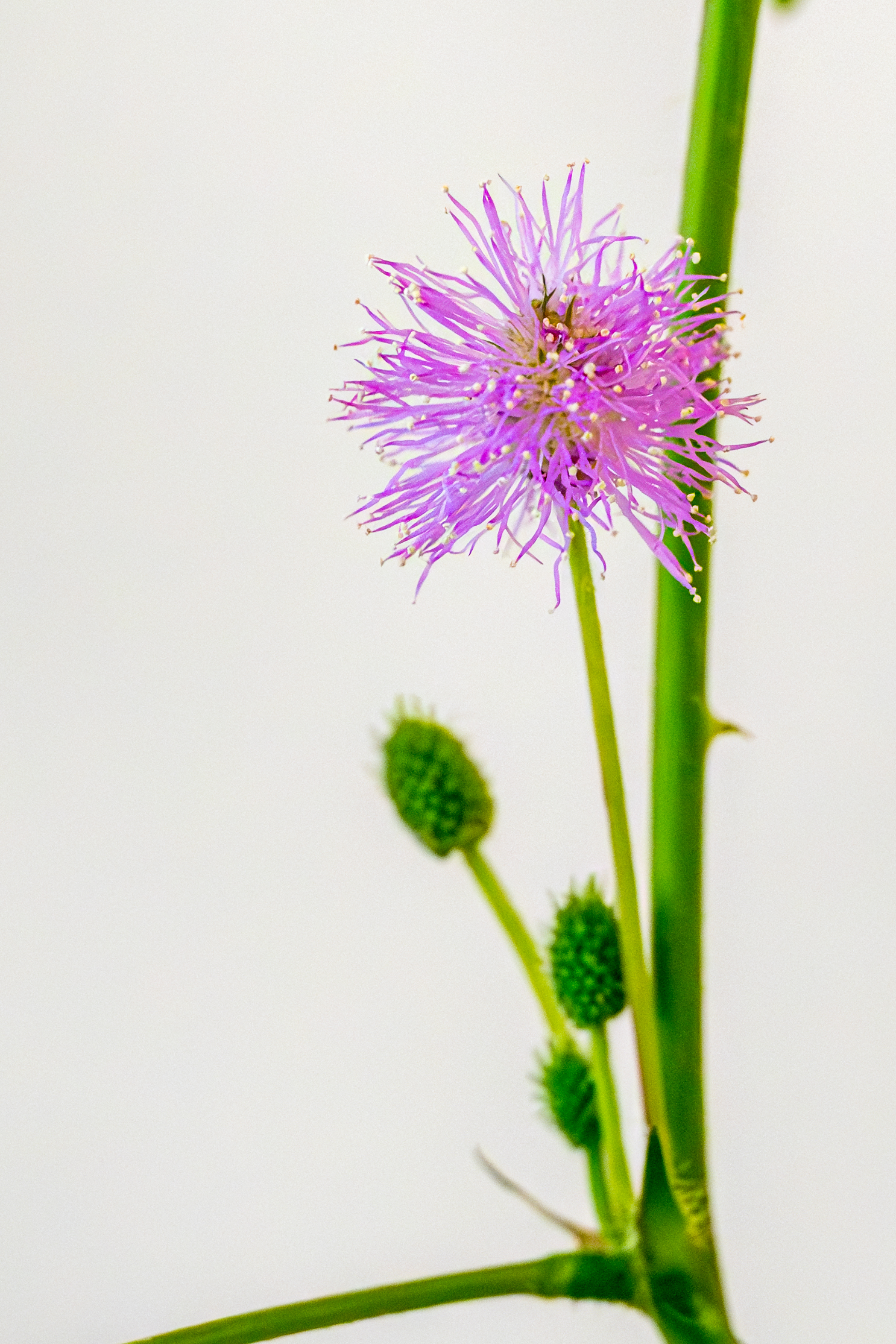
At 70 mm, f/5.6

== See also ==
- Nikon Z-mount
