= Nikon Z7II =

Full-frame mirrorless interchangeable-lens camera

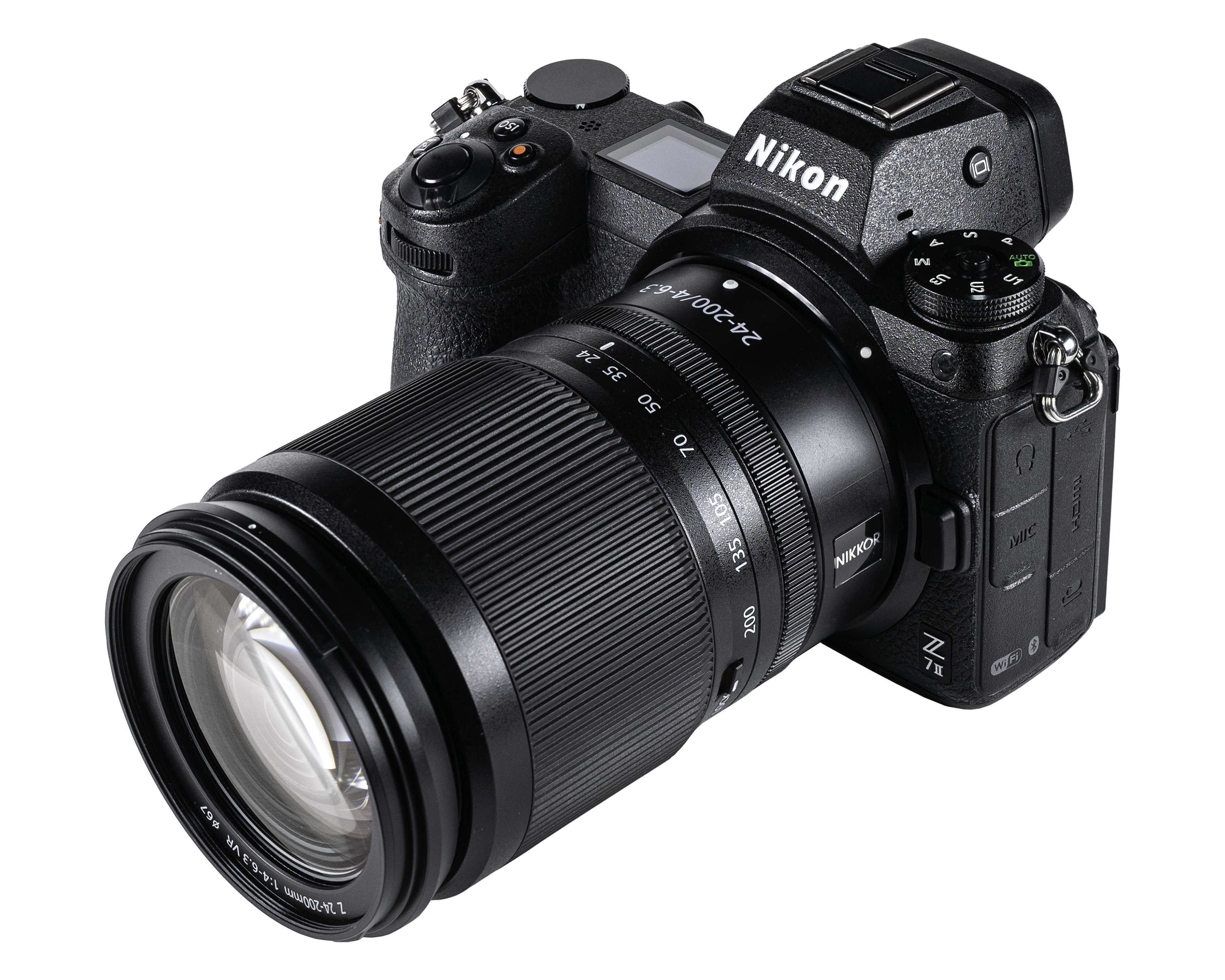
- Nikon Z7II paired with the Nikkor Z 24-200 mm f/4-6.3 VR lens

Overview
- Maker: Nikon
- Type: Full-frame mirrorless interchangeable-lens camera
- Released: 14 October 2020; 5 years ago
- Intro price: $2,999.95

Lens
- Lens mount: Nikon Z-mount

Sensor/medium
- Sensor type: Back-illuminated CMOS sensor
- Sensor size: Full frame (35.9 × 23.9 mm)
- Sensor maker: Sony
- Maximum resolution: 8,256 × 5,504 (45.7 effective megapixels)
- Film speed: Native range of ISO 64–25,600 (expandable to 32–102,400)
- Recording medium: 1× CFexpress Type B / XQD, 1× SD (UHS-II)

Focusing
- Focus: Single-servo AF (AF-S); Continuous-servo AF (AF-C); Full-time AF (AF-F; only available in video mode); Predictive focus tracking; Manual focus (electronic rangefinder can be used)
- Focus modes: Pinpoint; Single-point; Dynamic-area AF; Wide-area AF (small; large; Large, people; large, animals); Auto-area AF (default; people; animals)
- Focus areas: 493 points (single-point AF) with 90% coverage

Exposure/metering
- Exposure: TTL metering using camera image sensor
- Exposure modes: Programmed Auto [P] with flexible program; Shutter-Priority Auto [S]; Aperture-Priority Auto [A]; Manual [M]
- Exposure metering: TTL metering using camera image sensor; Highlight-weighted metering: -4 to +17 EV (ISO 100, f/2.0 lens, 20°C/68°F)
- Metering modes: Matrix metering; Center-weighted metering; Spot metering

Flash
- Flash: Built-in: No; Hot shoe

Shutter
- Frame rate: Up to 10 fps in extended high-speed continuous
- Shutter: Electronically controlled vertical-travel focal-plane mechanical shutter; electronic front-curtain shutter
- Shutter speeds: 30s – 1/8000s

Viewfinder
- Viewfinder: Quad-VGA (1280 × 960) EVF (3690000 dots)

Image processing
- Image processor: Dual Expeed 6
- White balance: Auto (3 types); Custom; Cloudy; Direct sunlight; Flash; Fluorescent (7 types); Incandescent; Natural light auto; Preset manual (up to 6 values can be stored, all with fine-tuning); Shade

General
- Video recording: 1080p video at up to 120 fps, and 4K video at up to 60 fps
- LCD screen: 3.2-inch tilting TFT LCD with 2.1 million dots with touchscreen
- Battery: EN-EL15c (backwards compatible with EN-EL15b batteries with slightly faster drain)
- Optional accessories: MB-N14 battery grip; MB-N11 battery grip; MB-N10 battery grip (no controls); MC-N10 remote grip (FW 1.50+)
- AV ports: USB Type-C; HDMI Type-C
- Data port(s): IEEE 802.11b/g/n/a/ac/Wi-Fi, Bluetooth Low Energy
- Body features: In-Body Image Stabilization
- Dimensions: 134×100.5×69.5 mm (5.28×3.96×2.74 in)
- Weight: 615 g (body only)
- Latest firmware: 1.70 / 3 June 2025; 15 months ago
- Made in: Thailand

Chronology
- Replaced: Nikon Z7

The Nikon Z7II is a high-end full-frame mirrorless interchangeable-lens camera (MILC) produced by Nikon, and is the successor to the Nikon Z7. The camera was officially announced on October 14, 2020, alongside the Nikon Z6II, and became available for purchase on November 5. It uses Nikon's Z-mount system.

== Features ==
- The most notable upgrade over the Nikon Z7 is the inclusion of a second memory card slot. The Z7II added an SD card (UHS-II) slot alongside the CFexpress/XQD card slot.
- The camera features dual Expeed 6 image processing engines, a first for Nikon cameras. This improves autofocus performance and enables 4K video recording at 60 fps.
- Low light sensitivity has been improved to -3 to +17 EV.
- The frame rate for photos is increased from 9 fps in extended high-speed continuous to 10 fps with a larger buffer as well (increased from 23 12-bit lossless RAW files to 77).
- The electronic viewfinder refresh rate and blackout time is improved from the original Z7.
- The autofocus system has improved with a new Wide-Area AF option with eye autofocus for both people and animals.
- Battery life has been increased from ~330 to ~360 CIPA-rated shots (or from 85 min to 105 min of video recording).
- In video recording, the camera can now record 4K "Ultra HD" footage at 60p with a 1.08x crop.
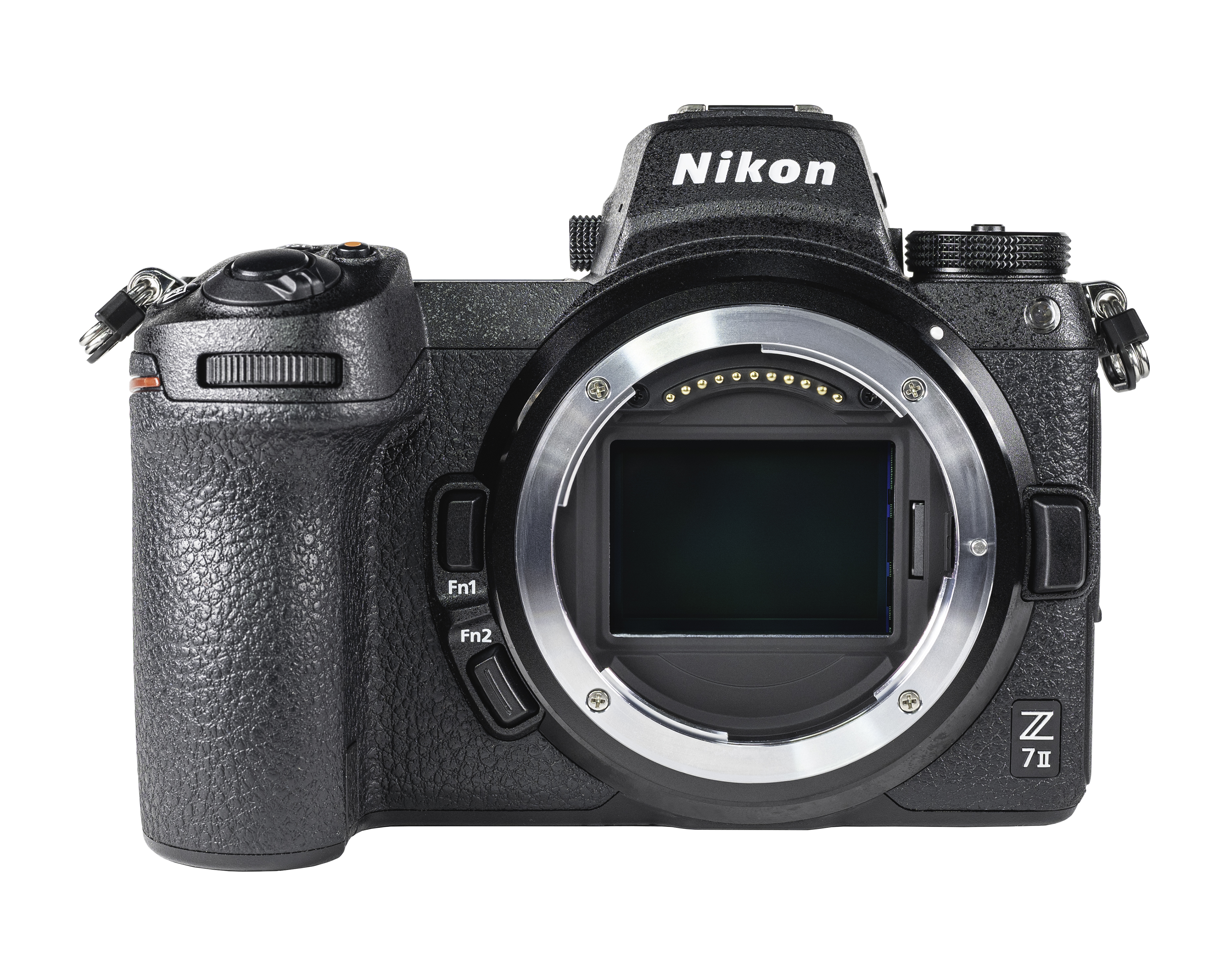
Z7II's uncovered sensor

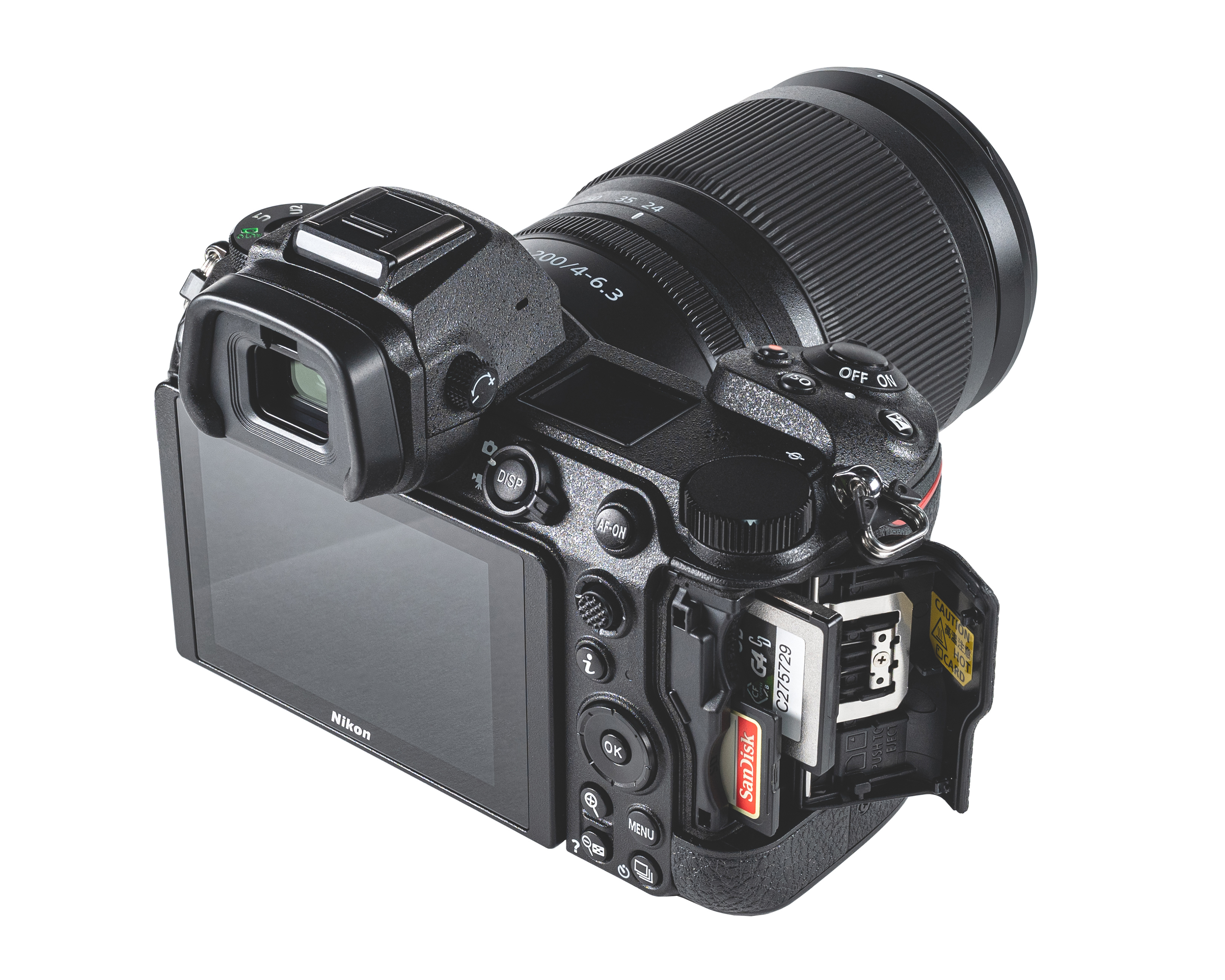

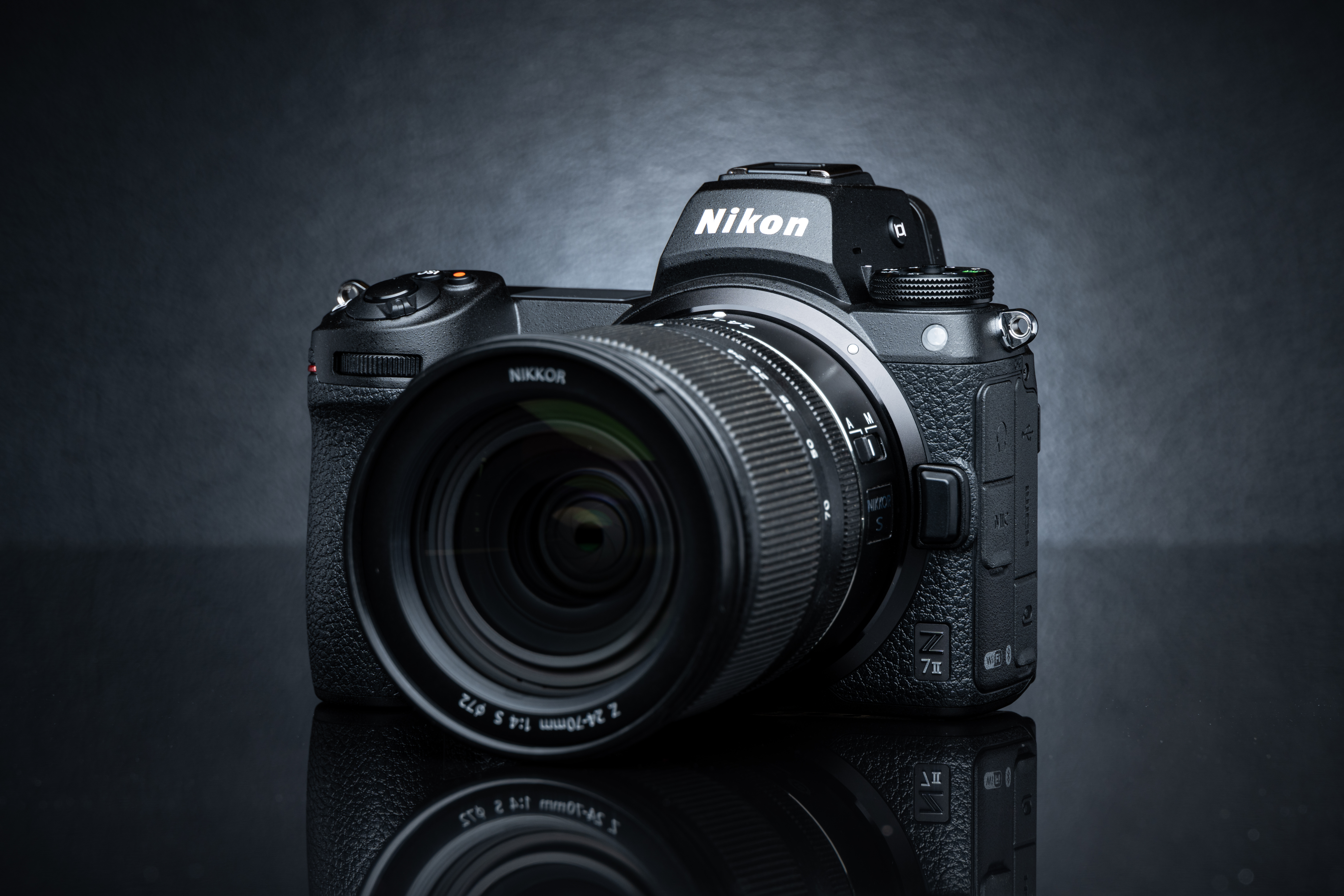
Z7II + Nikkor Z 24-70 mm f/4 S

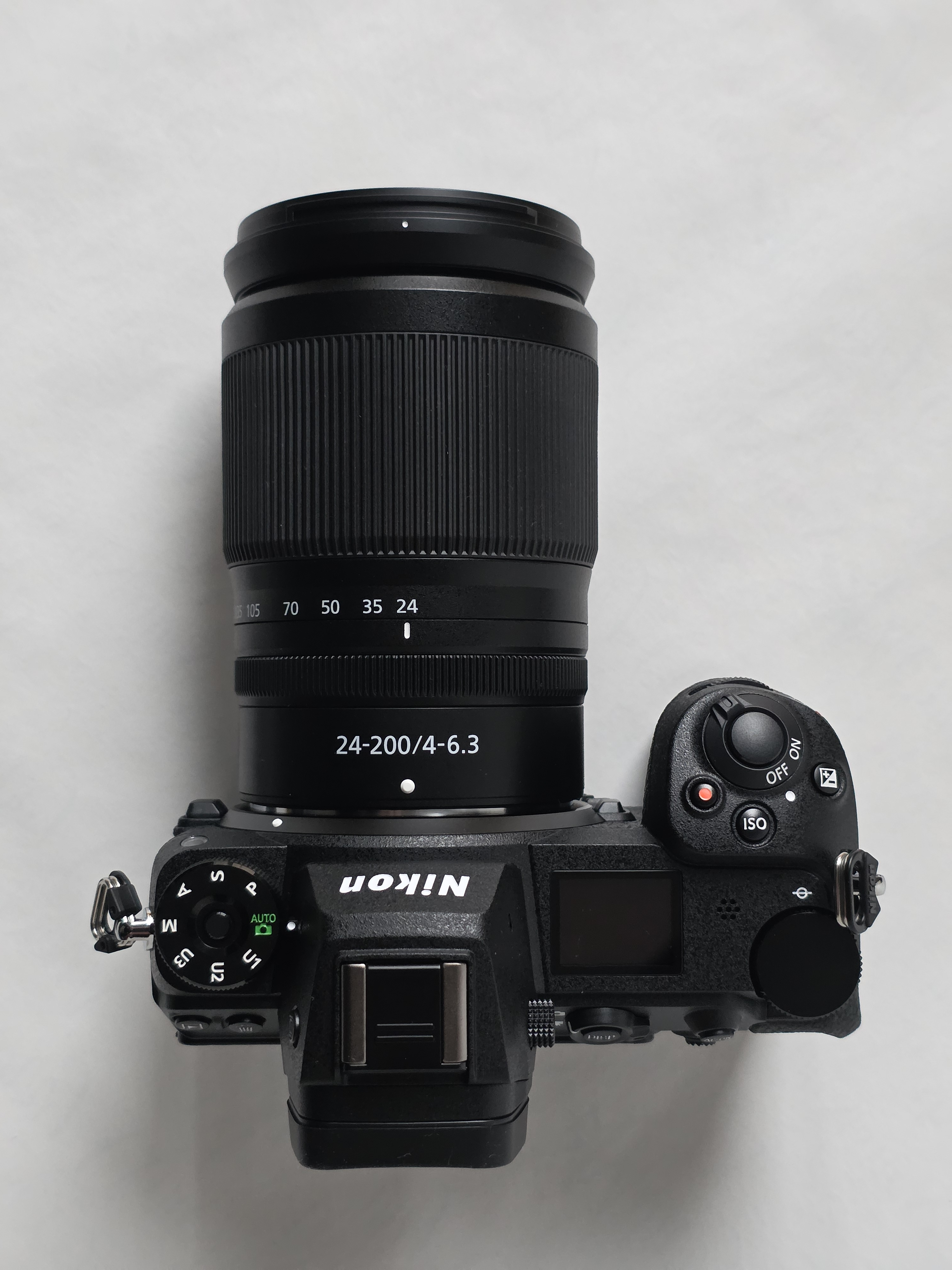
Z7II + Nikkor Z 24-200 mm f/4-6.3 VR

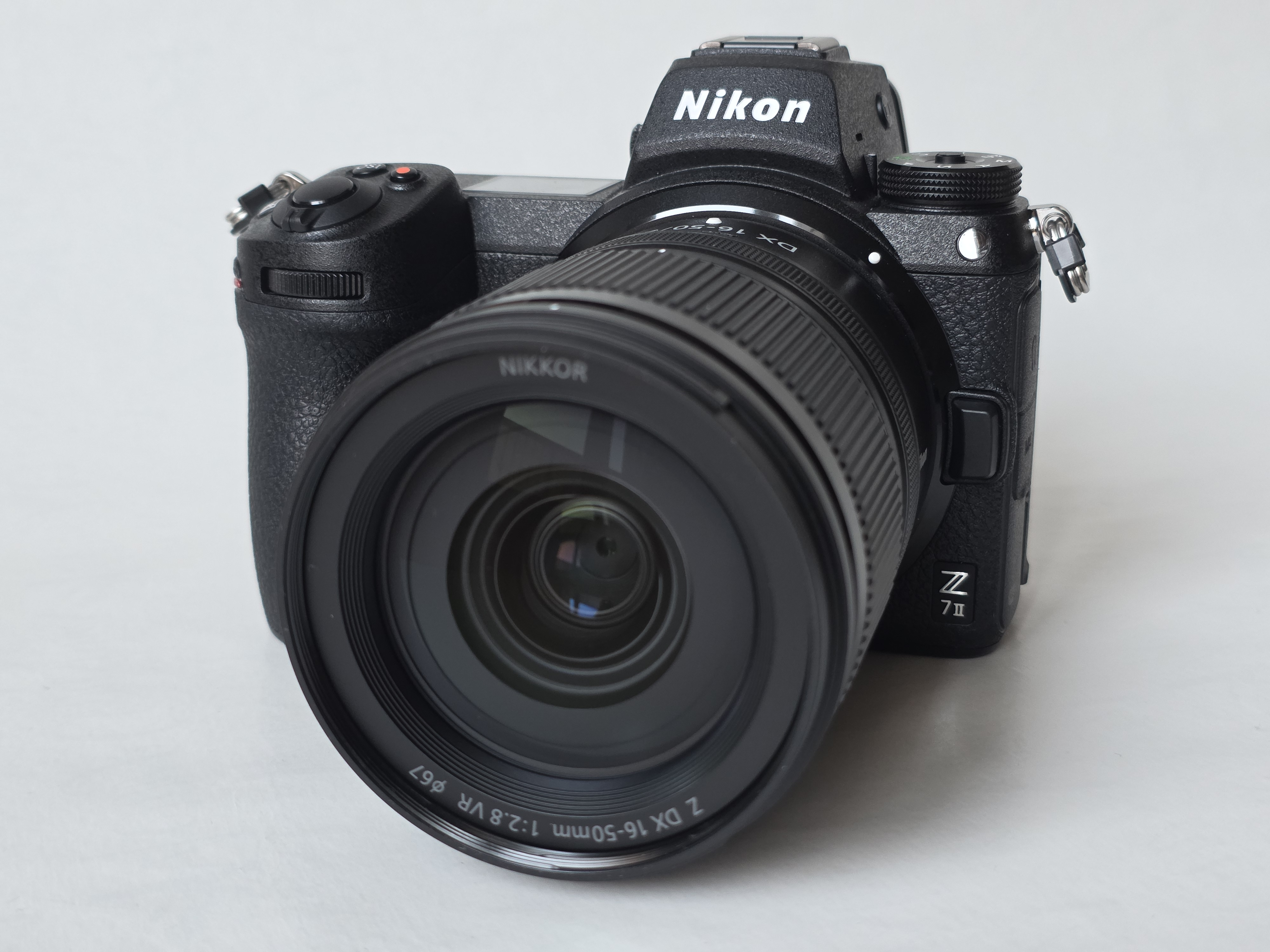
Z7II + Nikkor Z DX 16-50 mm f/2.8

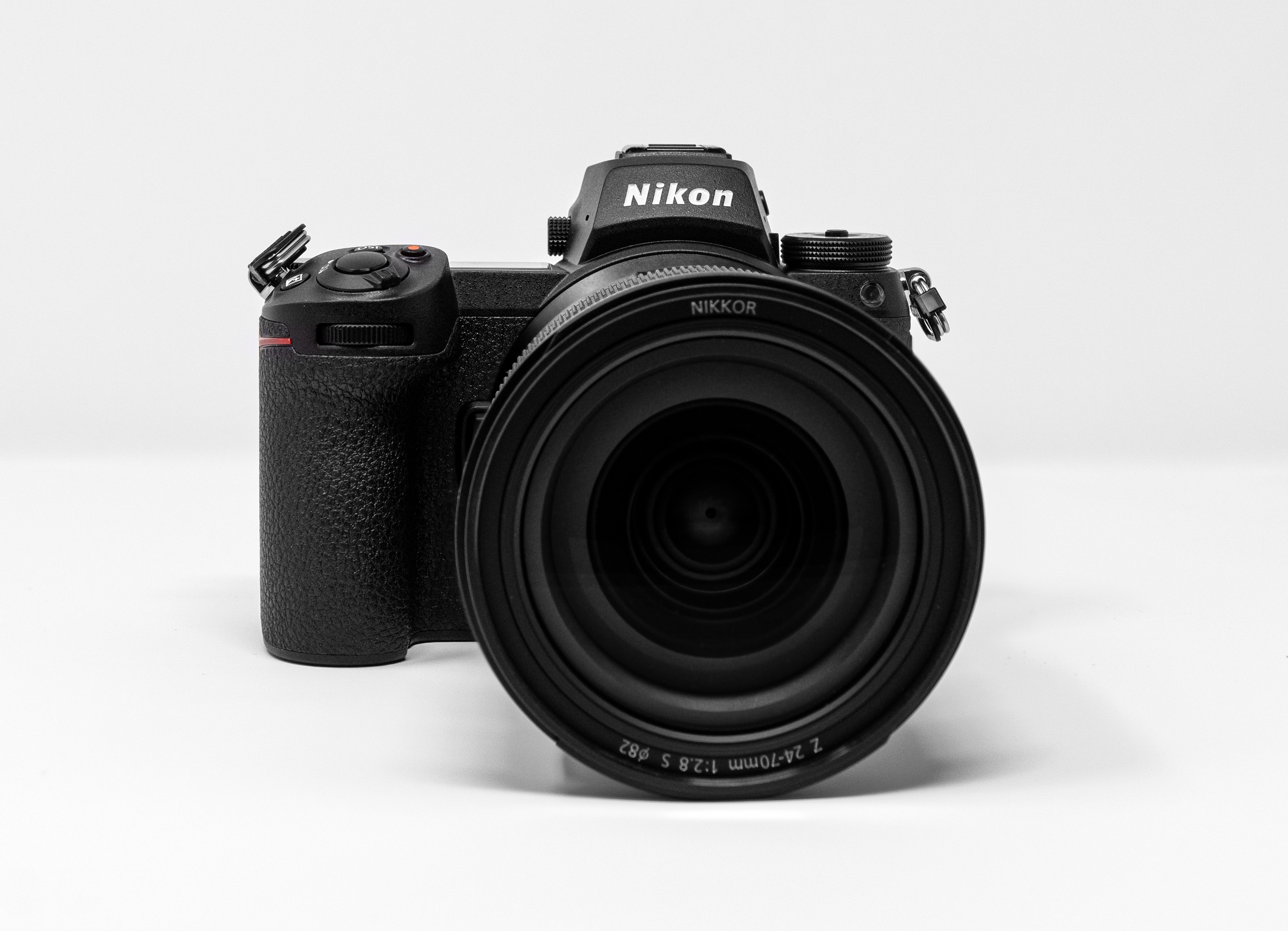
Z7II + Nikkor Z 24-70 mm f/2.8 S

Sensor	Class	2018	2019	2020	2021	2022	2023	2024	2025	2026
FX (Full-frame)	Flagship					^{8K} Z9 ^{S}				
FX (Full-frame)	Flagship							^{8K} Z8 ^{S}		
FX (Full-frame)	Professional		^{4K} Z7 ^{S}		^{4K} Z7Ⅱ ^{S}					
FX (Full-frame)	Professional		^{4K} Z6 ^{S}		^{4K} Z6Ⅱ ^{S}				^{6K} Z6Ⅲ ^{S}	
FX (Full-frame)	Cinema									^{6K} ZR ^{S}
FX (Full-frame)	Enthusiast							^{4K} Zf ^{S}		
FX (Full-frame)	Enthusiast				^{4K} Z5 ^{S}					^{4K} Z5Ⅱ ^{S}
DX (APS-C)	Enthusiast					^{4K} Zfc				
DX (APS-C)	Prosumer			^{4K} Z50					^{4K} Z50Ⅱ	
DX (APS-C)	Entry-level						^{4K} Z30			
Sensor	Class									
Sensor	Class	2018	2019	2020	2021	2022	2023	2024	2025	2026
