= Nikon Z7 =

2018 full-frame mirrorless camera

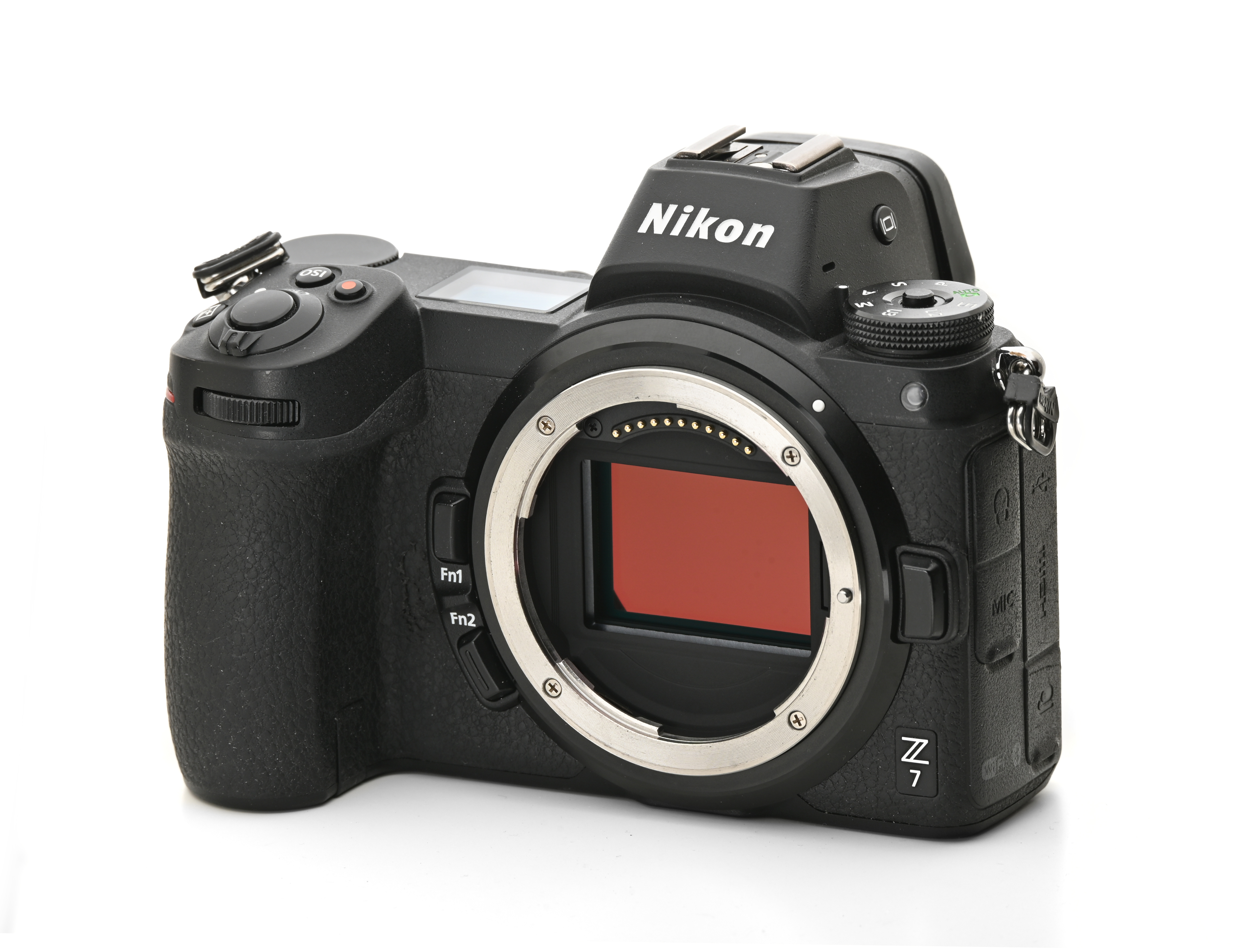
- Z7 camera body without lens

Overview
- Maker: Nikon
- Type: Full-frame mirrorless interchangeable-lens camera
- Production: 2018-9-27 through 2022-8-10 (3 years 11 months)

Lens
- Lens mount: Nikon Z-mount

Sensor/medium
- Sensor type: Back-illuminated CMOS sensor (Nikon FX format)
- Sensor size: 35.9 mm × 23.9 mm Full-frame
- Sensor maker: Sony
- Maximum resolution: 8256 × 5504 (45.75 effective megapixels)
- Film speed: ISO 64–25600 (standard); ISO 32-102400 (expandable)
- Recording medium: 1 × CFexpress Type B / XQD

Focusing
- Focus: AI AF
- Focus areas: 493 points

Exposure/metering
- Exposure: TTL exposure metering
- Exposure modes: Programmed Auto [P] with flexible program; Shutter-Priority Auto [S]; Aperture-Priority Auto [A]; Manual [M]
- Exposure metering: TTL exposure metering

Flash
- Flash: Built-in: No; Hot shoe

Shutter
- Shutter: Electronically controlled vertical-travel focal-plane mechanical shutter, Electronic front-curtain shutter
- Shutter speeds: 30s - 1/8000s
- Continuous shooting: 5.5fps / 9fps (expand)

Viewfinder
- Viewfinder: Quad-VGA EVF (1280x960 pixels, 3690000 'dots')

Image processing
- Image processor: Expeed 6

General
- Video recording: 4K UHD at 30p/25p/24p, Full HD
- LCD screen: 3.2-inch tilting TFT LCD with touchscreen, 1024x682 pixel resolution (2.10 million 'dots')
- Battery: EN-EL15b
- Optional accessories: MB-N10 battery grip (no controls); MC-N10 remote grip (fw. 3.60+)
- AV port(s): USB Type-C, HDMI Type-C, Thunderbolt 4
- Data port(s): IEEE 802.11b/g/n/a/ac/Wi-Fi, Bluetooth Low Energy
- Body features: In-Body Image Stabilization (IBIS)
- Dimensions: 134×100.5×67.5 mm (5.28×3.96×2.66 in)
- Weight: 585 g (21 oz) (body only)
- Latest firmware: 3.80 / 13 May 2025; 16 months ago
- Made in: Japan

Chronology
- Successor: Nikon Z7II

The Nikon Z7 is a 45.7 megapixel full-frame mirrorless interchangeable-lens camera produced by Nikon. The camera was officially announced on August 23, 2018, for release in September 2018. It was the first camera to use Nikon's new Z-mount system; the second model, released in November 2018, was the 24.5 megapixel Nikon Z6.

Three Z-mount lenses were available by December 2018, the Nikkor Z 24-70 mm f/4 S, the 35 mm f/1.8 S and the 50 mm f/1.8 S, all three covering a full-frame (FX) image size. Nikon F-mount lenses can be used, with various degrees of compatibility, via the Nikon FTZ (F-to-Z) (and the later FTZ II) mount adapters. In late 2018, Nikon also published a "roadmap" of lenses to be released between 2019 and 2021. A total of nine products were included in that list.

The Nikon Z7 was succeeded by the Nikon Z7II in October 2020, and was discontinued on August 10, 2022.

== Features ==
- 45.7 megapixel Back-illuminated sensor (BSI) CMOS sensor.
- Native ISO range of 64–25,600.
- Expeed 6 image processor.
- Nikon Z mount featuring a 55 mm throat diameter for a less divergent optical path between lens exit pupil and image sensor.
- 16 mm flange distance.
- Nikon F-mount lenses can be used through the Nikon FTZ lens adapter.
- 493-point autofocus system that can automatically switch between phase detect auto-focus and contrast detect auto-focus. The focus points cover 90% of the viewfinder area.
- 5-stop in-body image stabilization.
- Up to 9 fps continuous shooting that is also compatible with F-mount lenses when mounted with the FTZ lens adapter.
- An electronic viewfinder (EVF) with a 3.7 million dot display with a 0.8x magnification and a 37° viewing angle.
- The rear display is a 3.2" tiltable touchscreen with 2.1 million dots.
- It can record 1080p video at up to 120 fps, and 4K video at up to 30 fps. Video can be output over an HDMI connection in 10-bit N-Log for advanced external recording devices.
- The camera comes with an EN-EL15b battery, and is compatible with EN-EL15a batteries and EN-EL15 batteries.

== Gallery ==
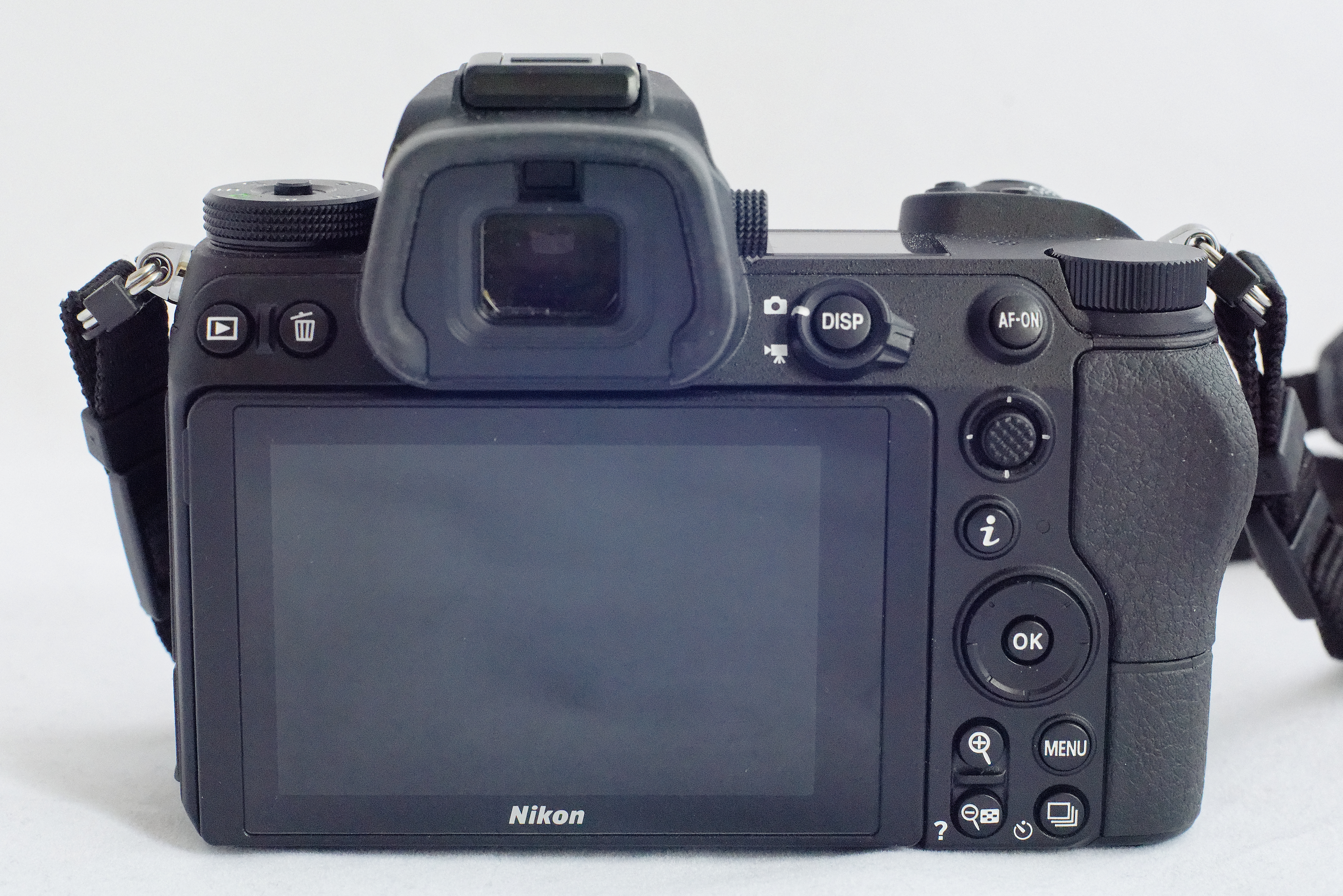

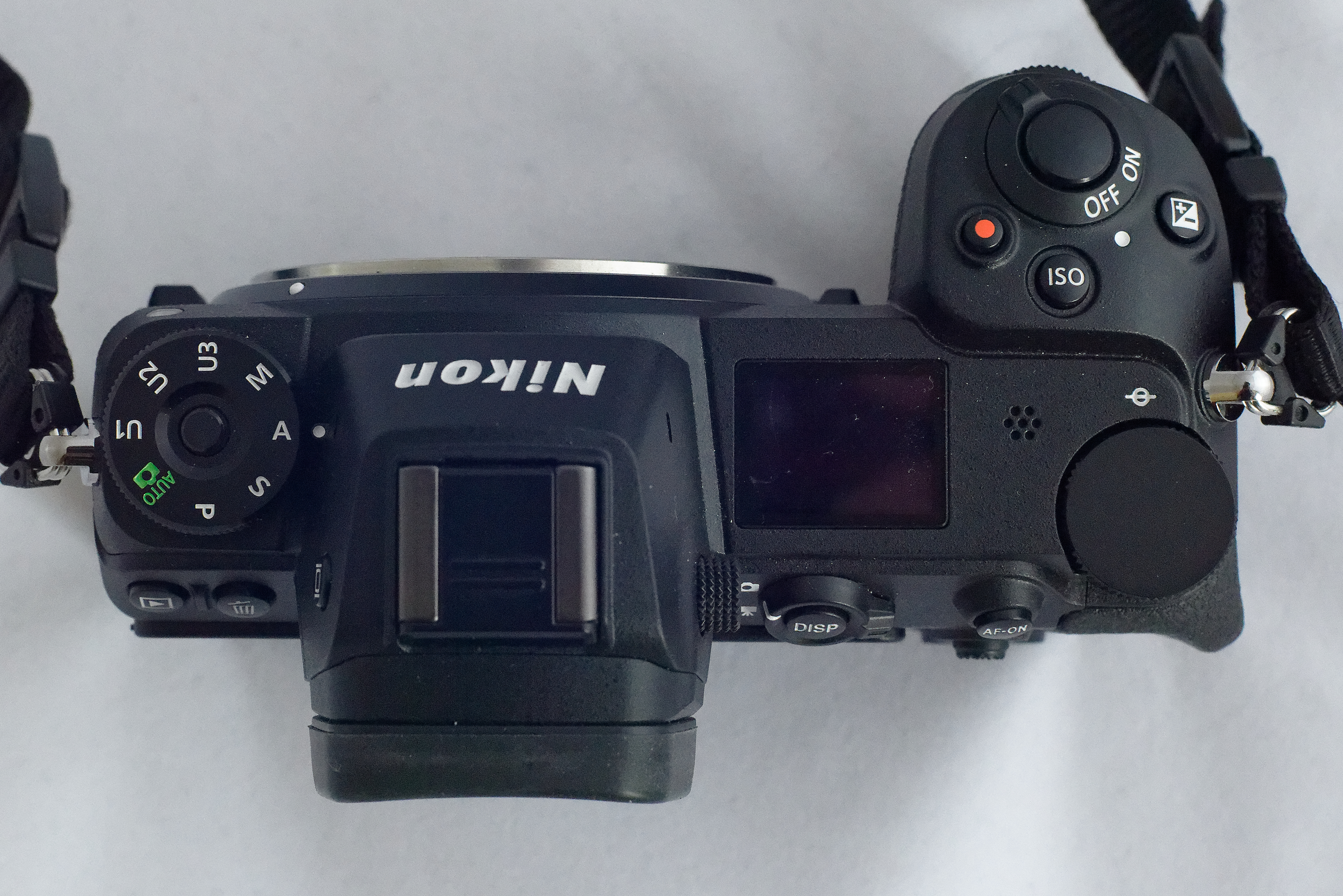

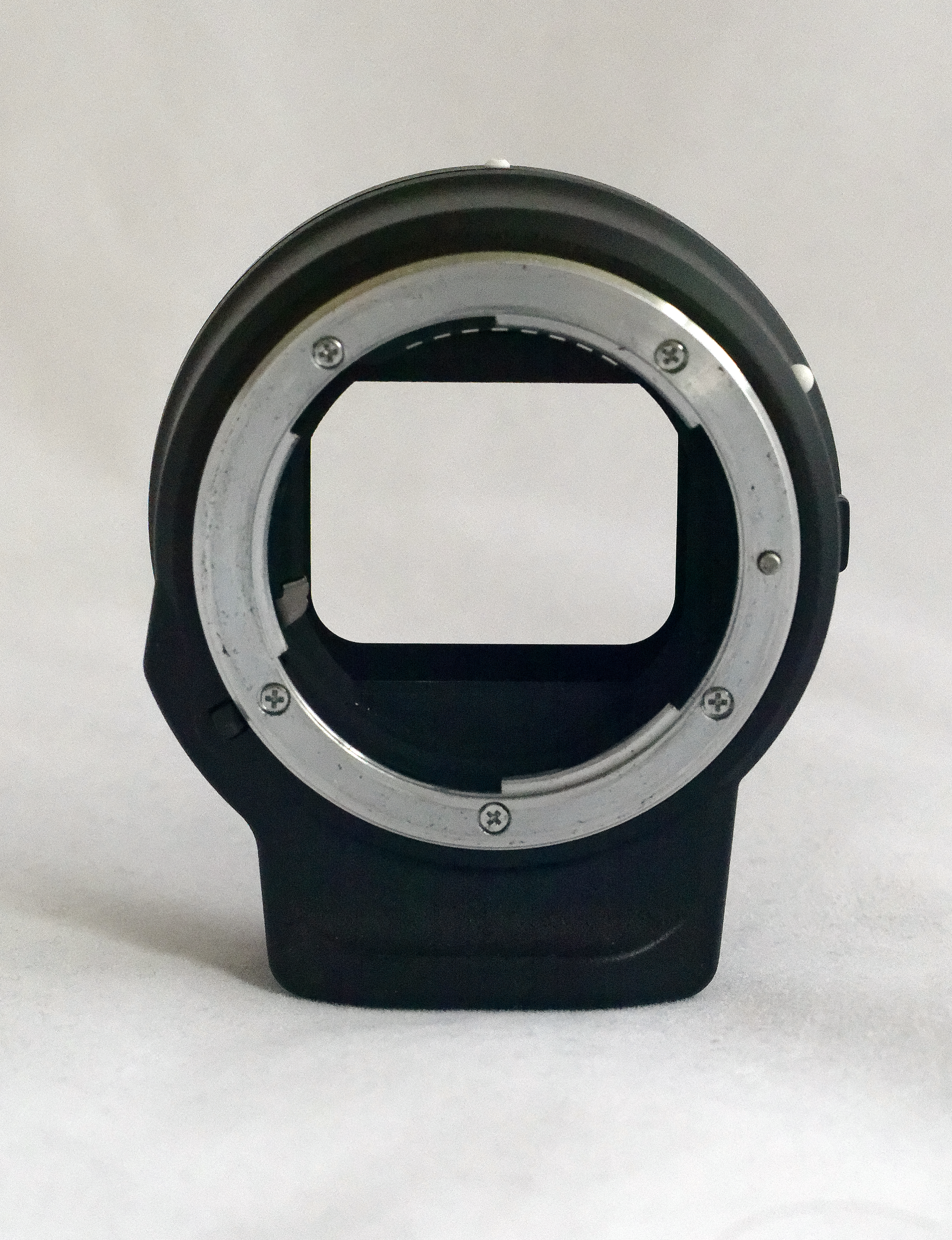

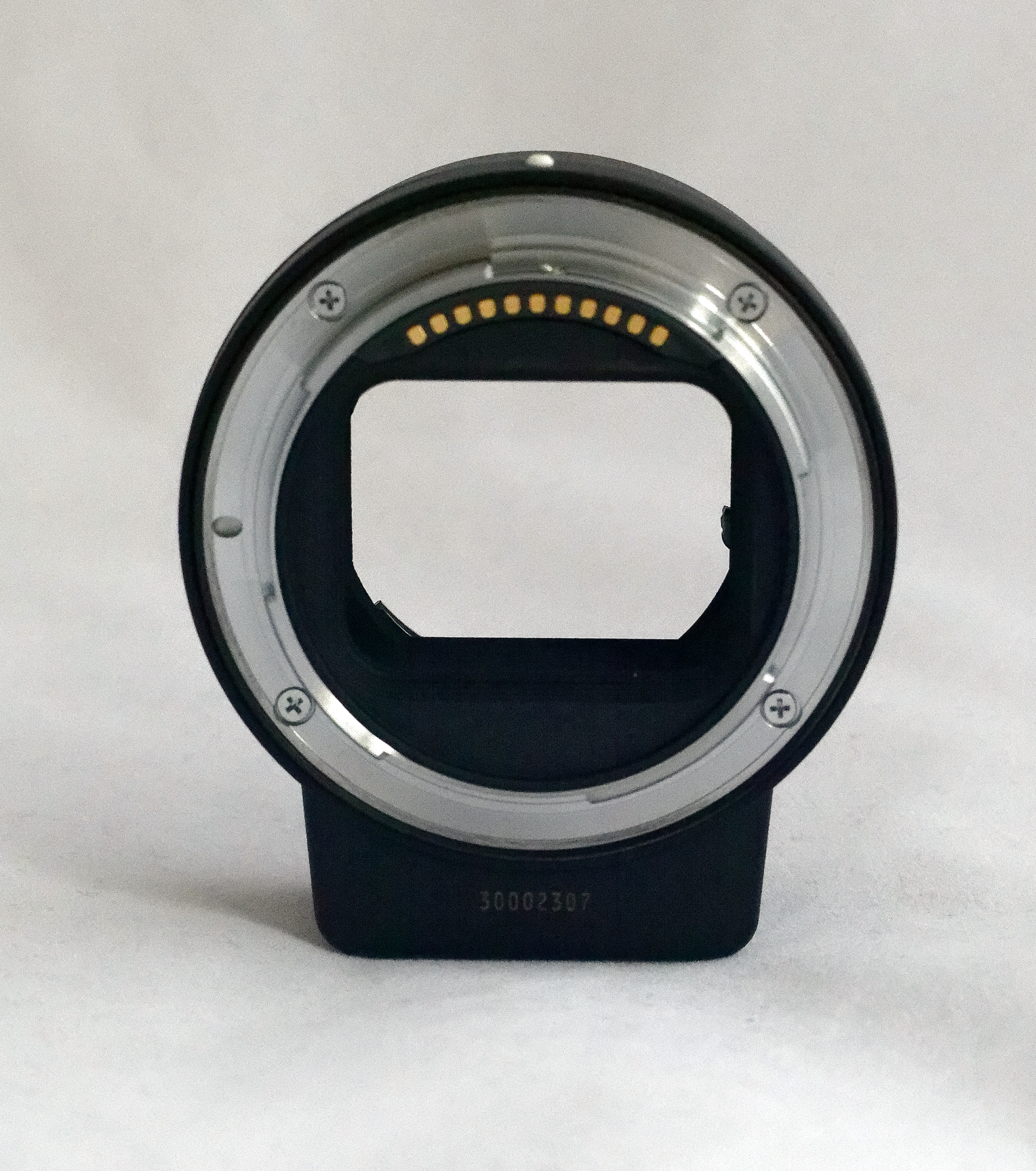

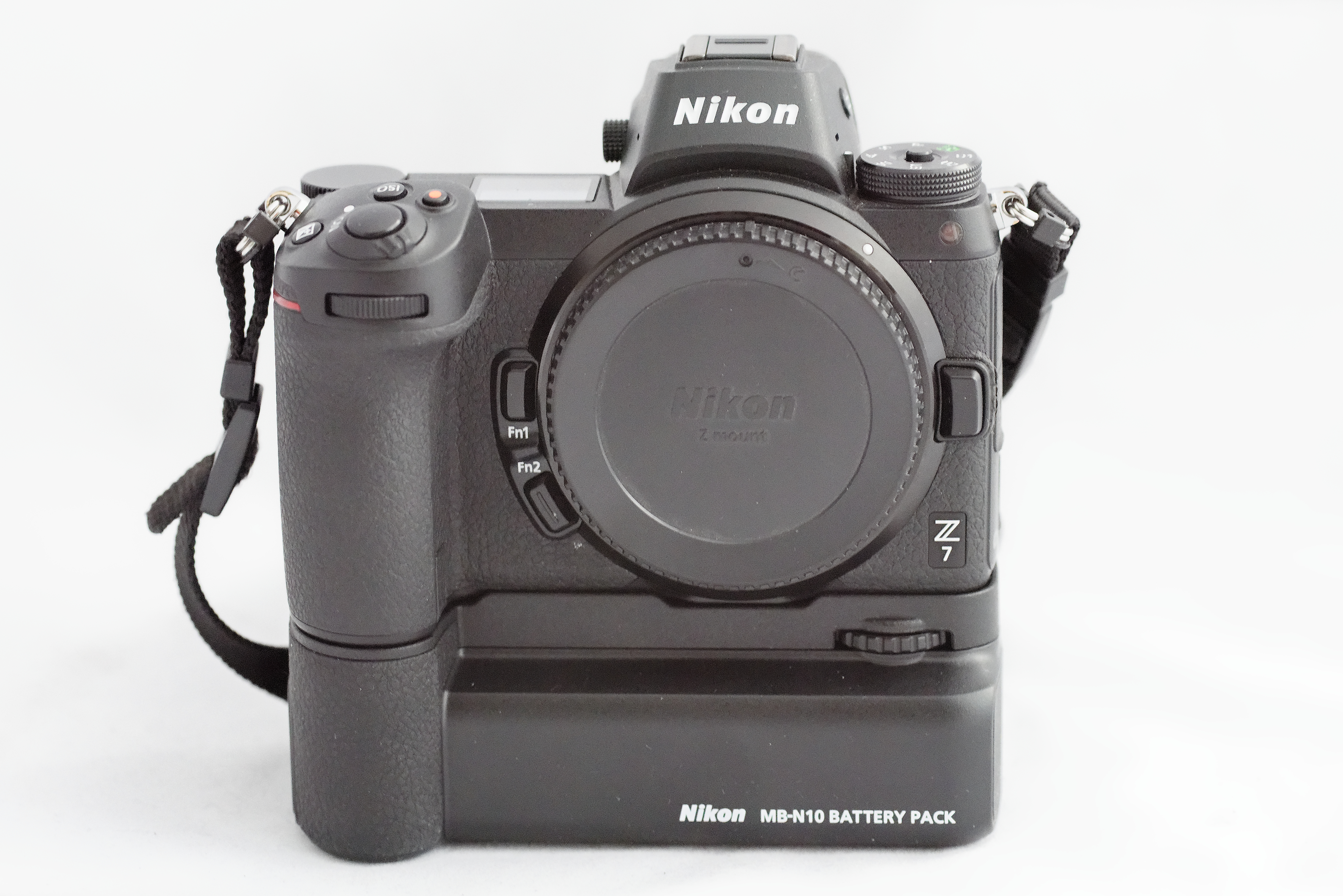
Battery grip MB-N10

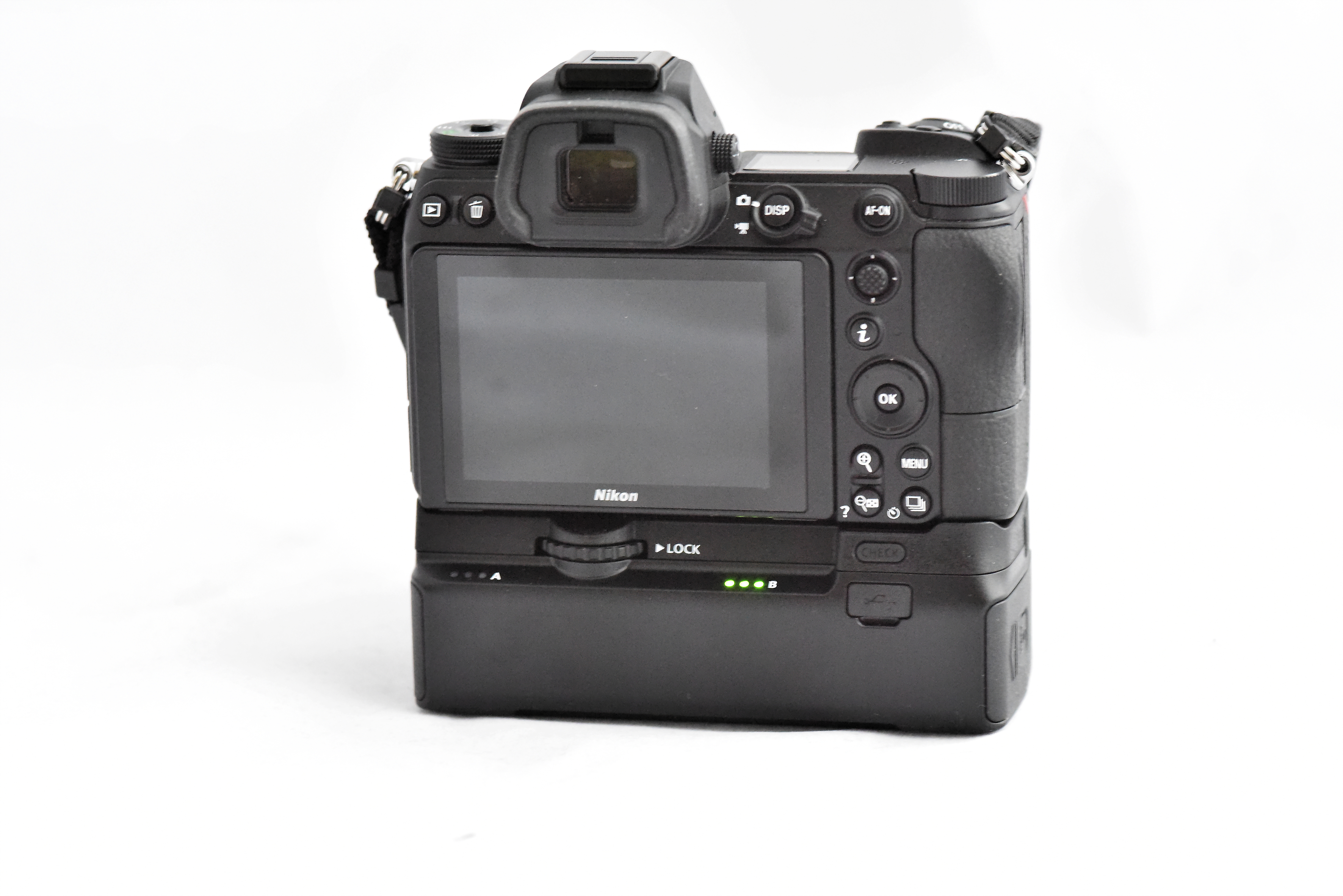
Battery grip MB-N10

== Update history ==
The Z6 and Z7 share firmware updates with only minor differences due to the different sensors.

== Reception ==
After completing their test of the new camera, the Digital Photography Review web site provided this conclusion: "The Nikon Z7 ... is also its most well-rounded camera for stills and video, and an exciting indicator for what's to come from the 101 year-old company. But first generation products are rarely perfect, and the Nikon Z7 is no exception". The overall score was 89%.

The positive specifics were briefly stated: "the camera feels, handles, and operates like a smaller, lighter full-frame Nikon DSLR - from button placement to menu layout, to the robustness of the build quality and the comfort of the grip. But there are some small differences, namely in the way the AF system operates. It is also the first Nikon full-framer with a truly useful silent shutter and mechanical in-body stabilization. On the cinema side it offers a wide variety of 4K video capture options that should satisfy both home-movie-makers and advanced videographers alike, but possibly not established professionals".

The site provided this summary of the less positive aspects: "the Z7 technically offers the same calculated Raw dynamic range as the D850, on sensor AF points lead to banding/striping which limits usable DR [dynamic range]. Autofocus, while reliable in good light, hunts more than we'd like as light levels drop. And AF tracking as a whole lags behind the competition, as well as Nikon's own full-frame DSLRs, both in terms of reliability and usability". (All of these issues were dealt with in subsequent firmware updates. The autofocus became far more reliable and the banding issue was dealt with. It might be important to mention that all digital cameras suffer to some degree from this phenomenon caused by amplification of the signal. If the data isn't decoded correctly, the amplification artifacts can and do happen.)

In 2018, when the Z7 was released, there were some real issues in the photographic community regarding incorrect information or outright defamation. The Z7 was certainly a victim of this trend. Though a touch behind the overall market on level of technological advancement the Z7 was a strong contender and an excellent first build of a mirrorless camera by Nikon. Most of the initial issues with the camera were dealt with either entirely or almost entirely with consequential firmware updates.

This camera helped Nikon enter the mirrorless camera market and began its mirrorless journey culminating in the current era Z8 and Z9 cameras which were among the highest performing mirrorless cameras being sold in 2024.

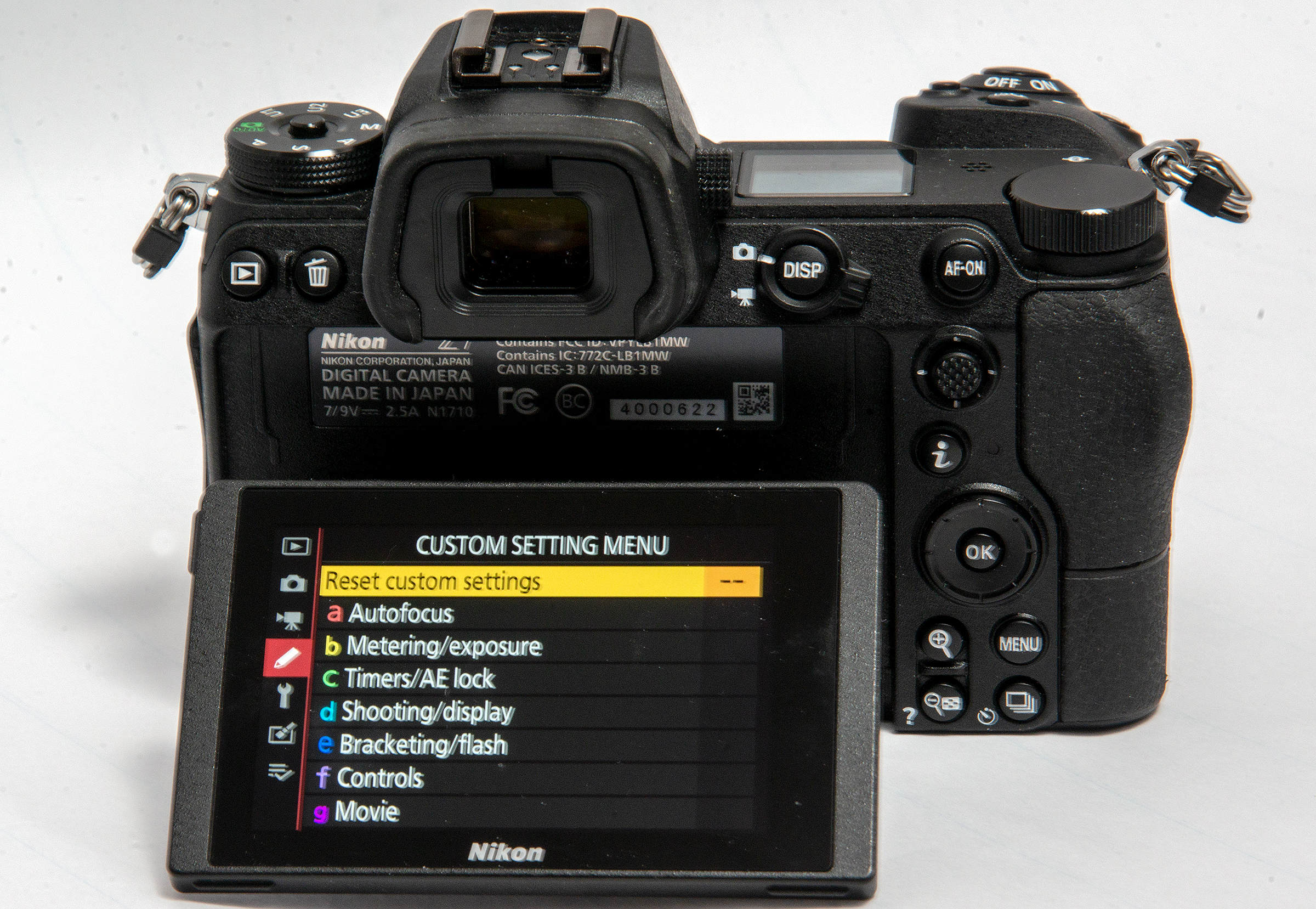

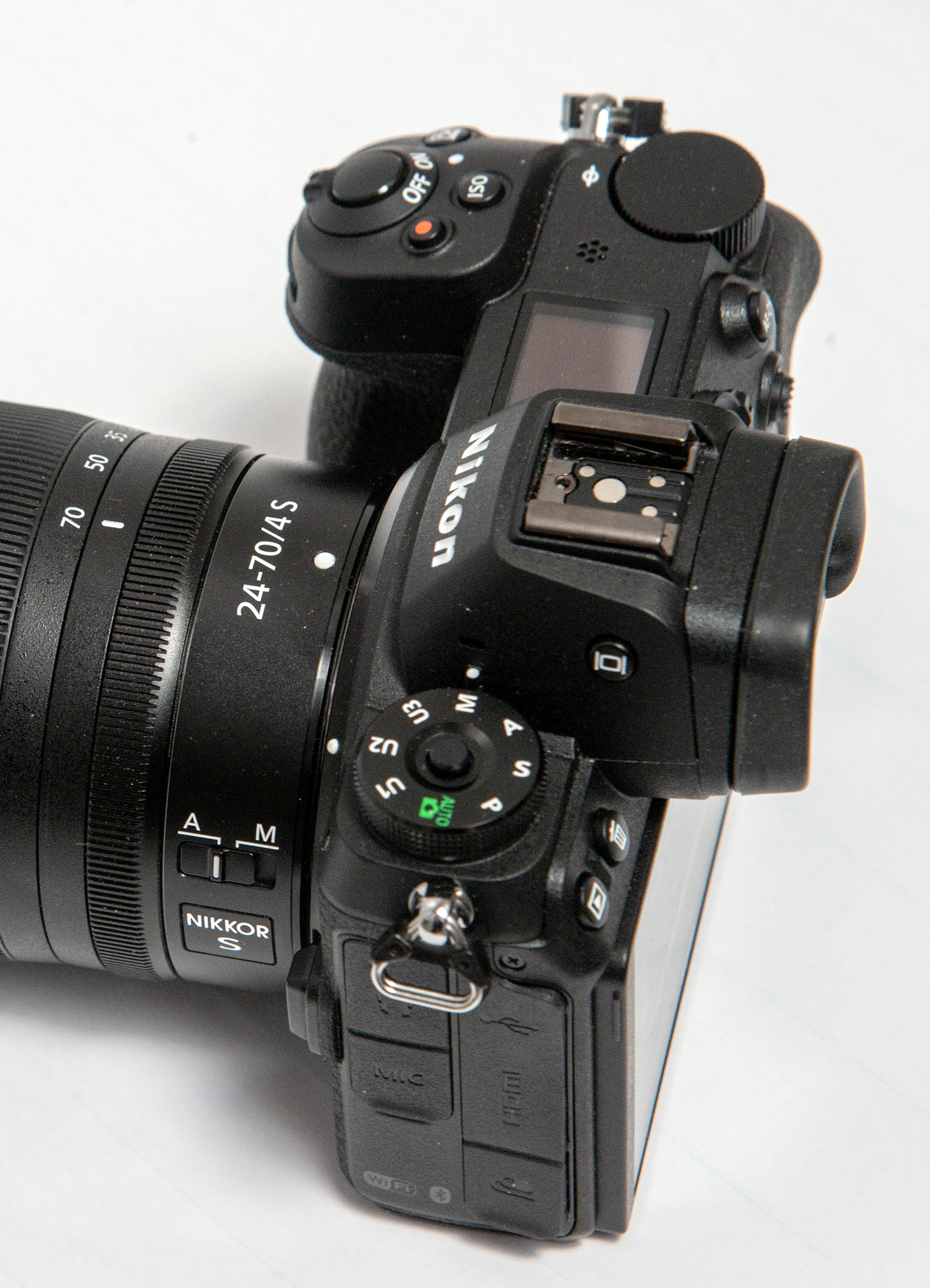

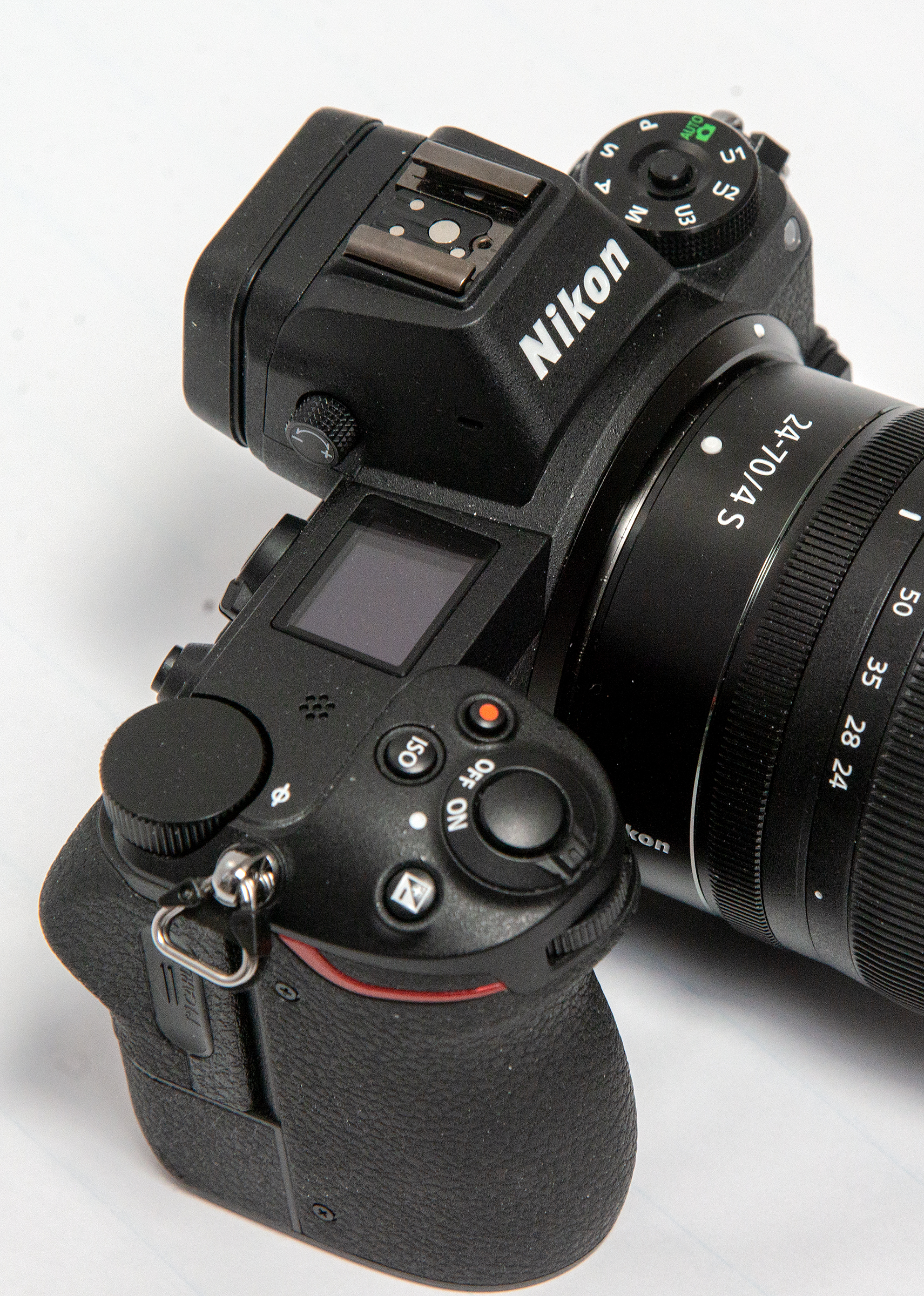

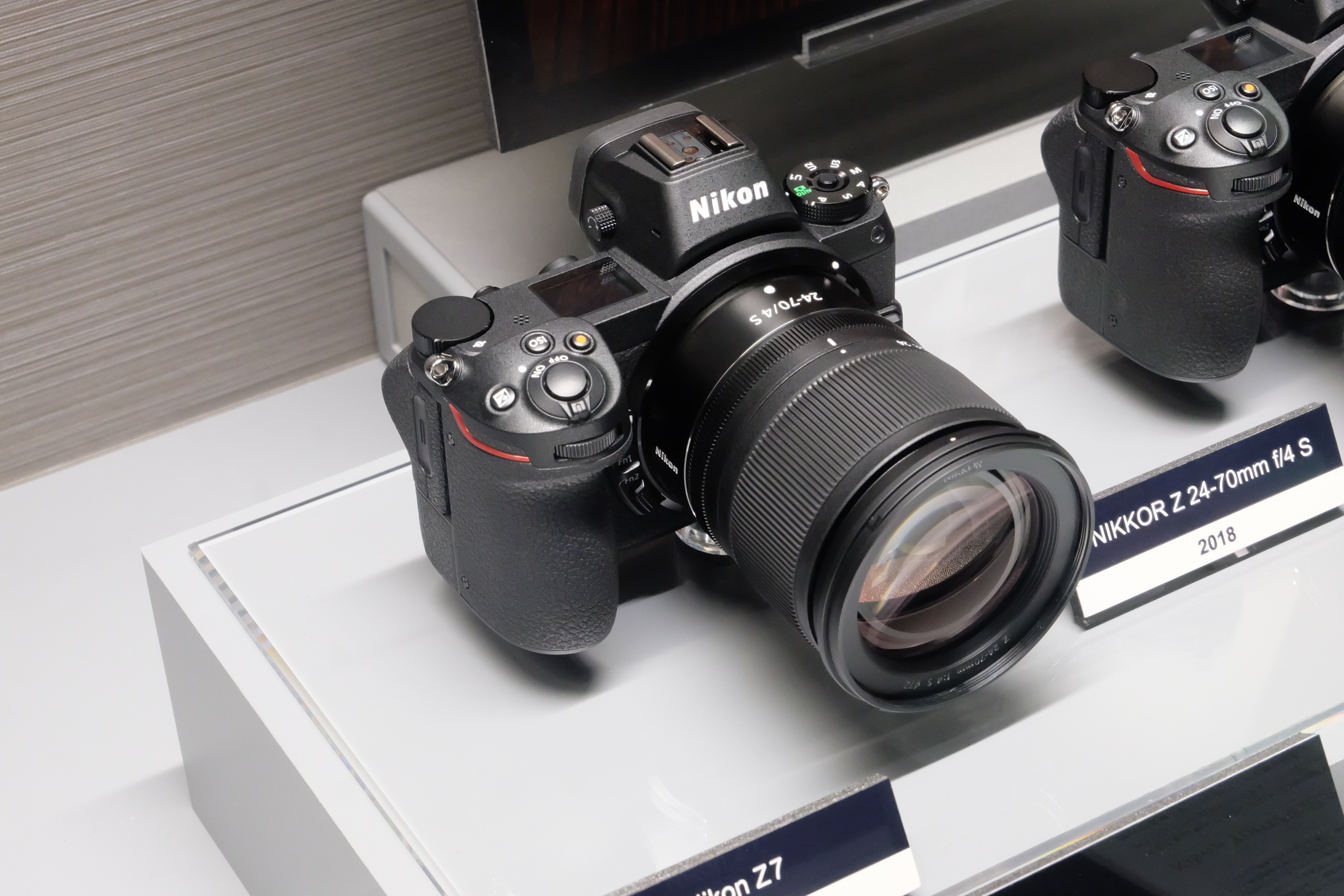

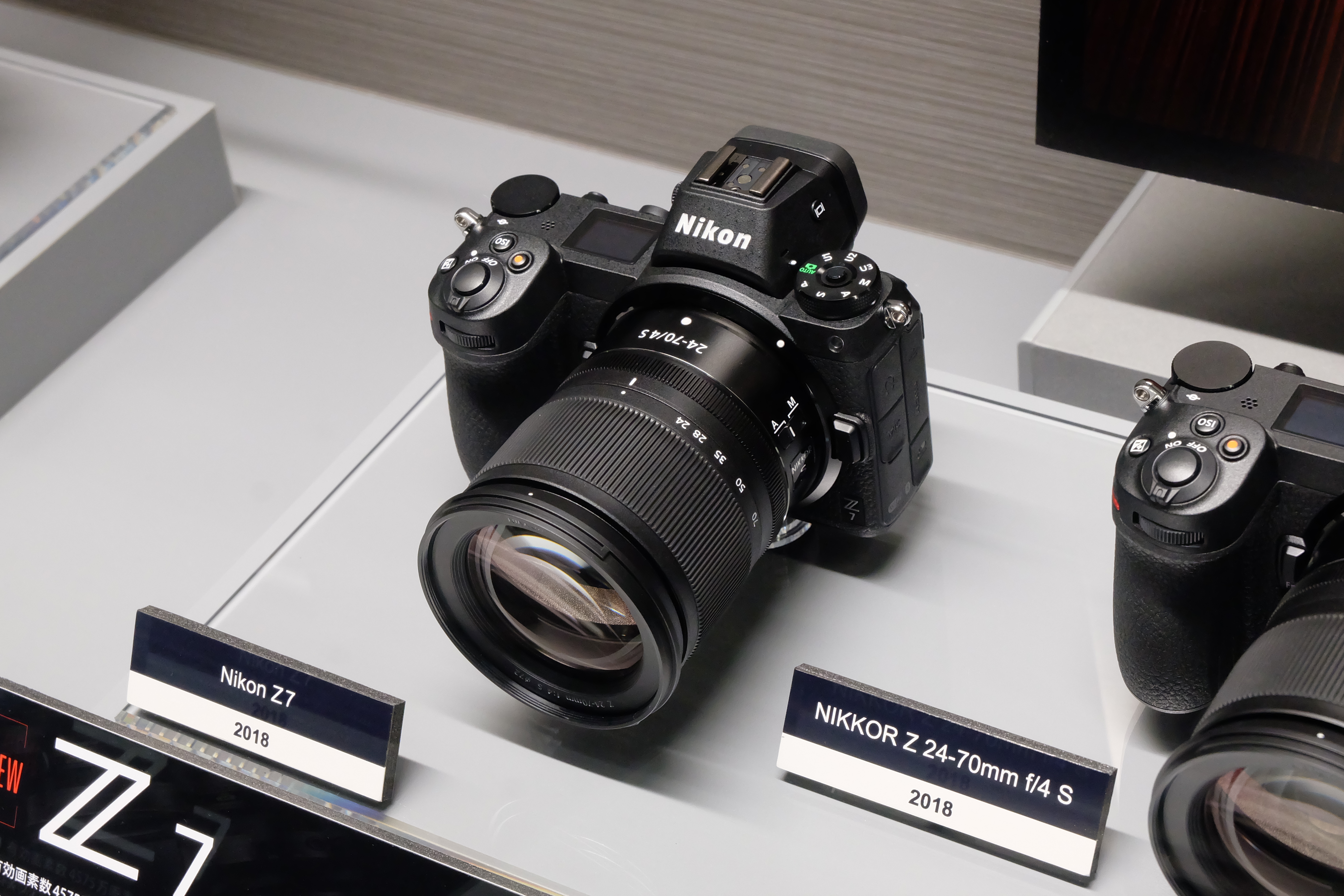

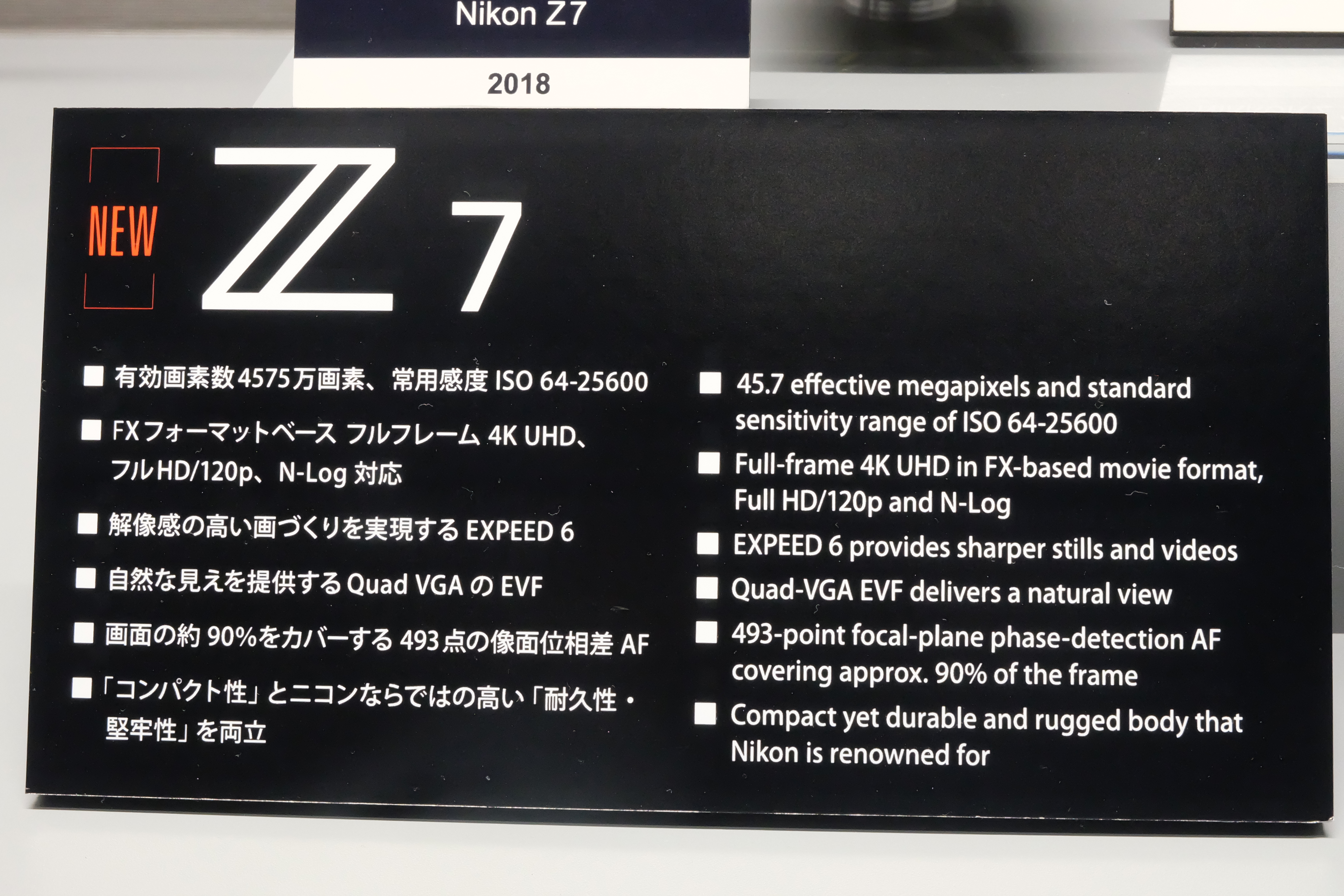

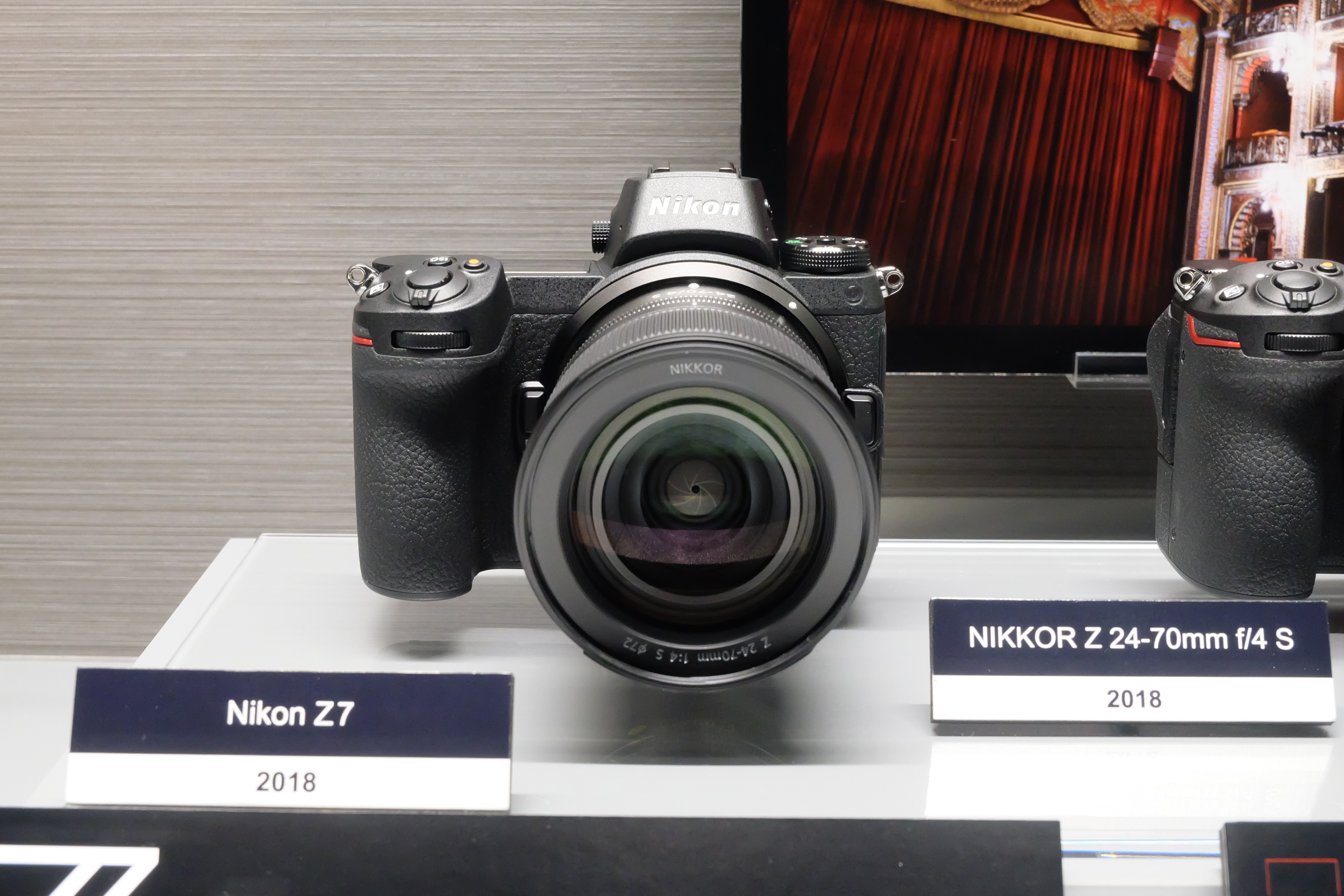

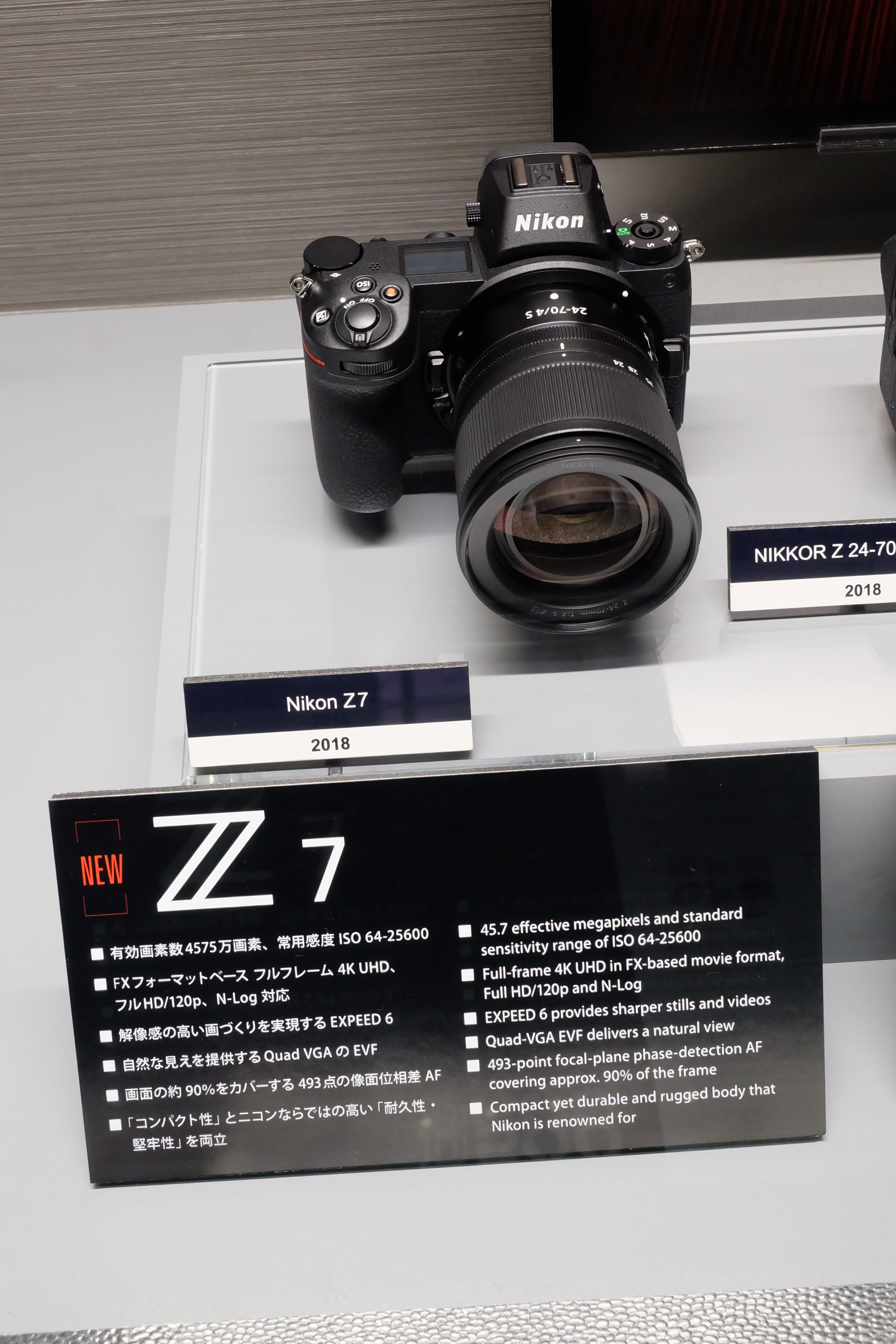

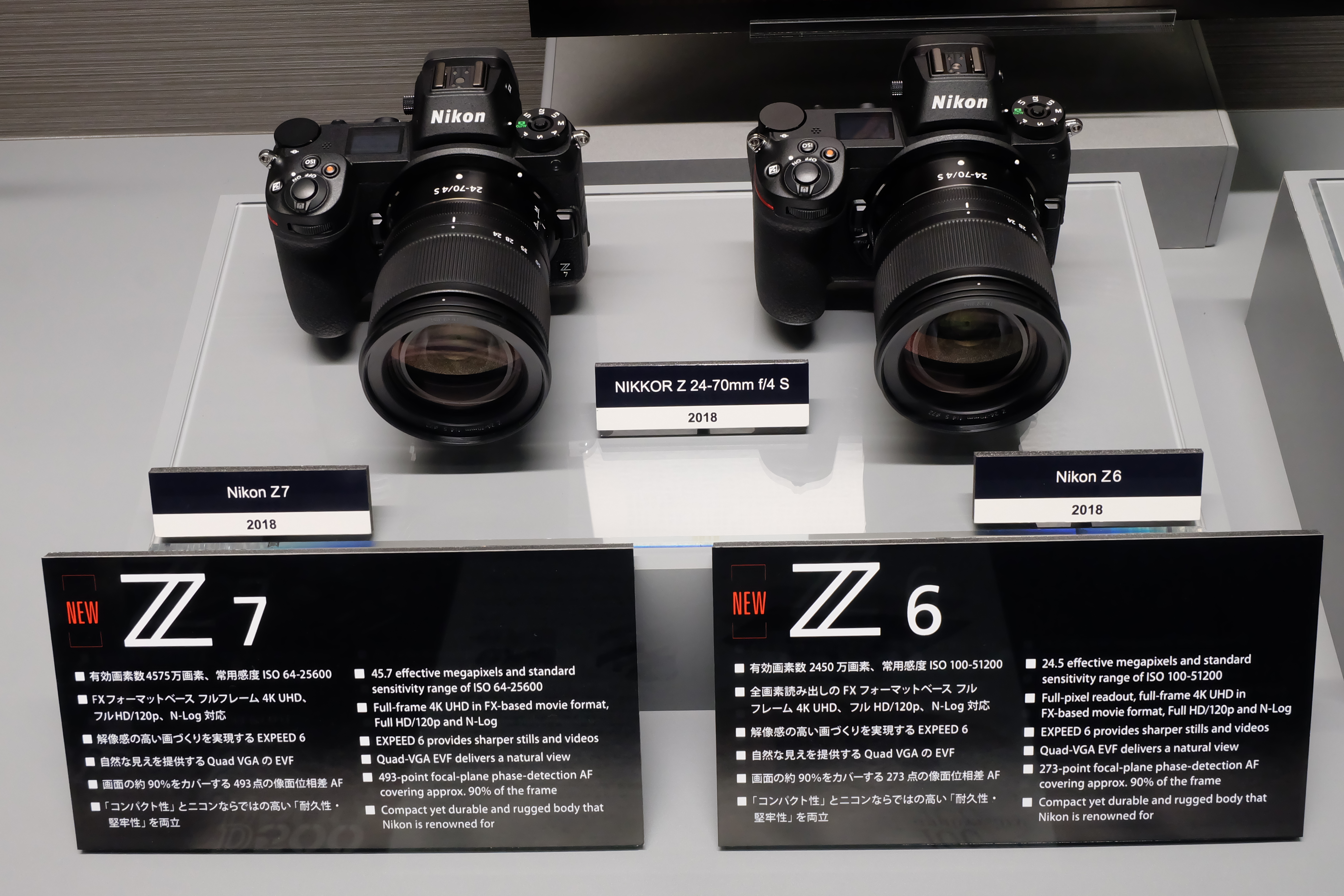

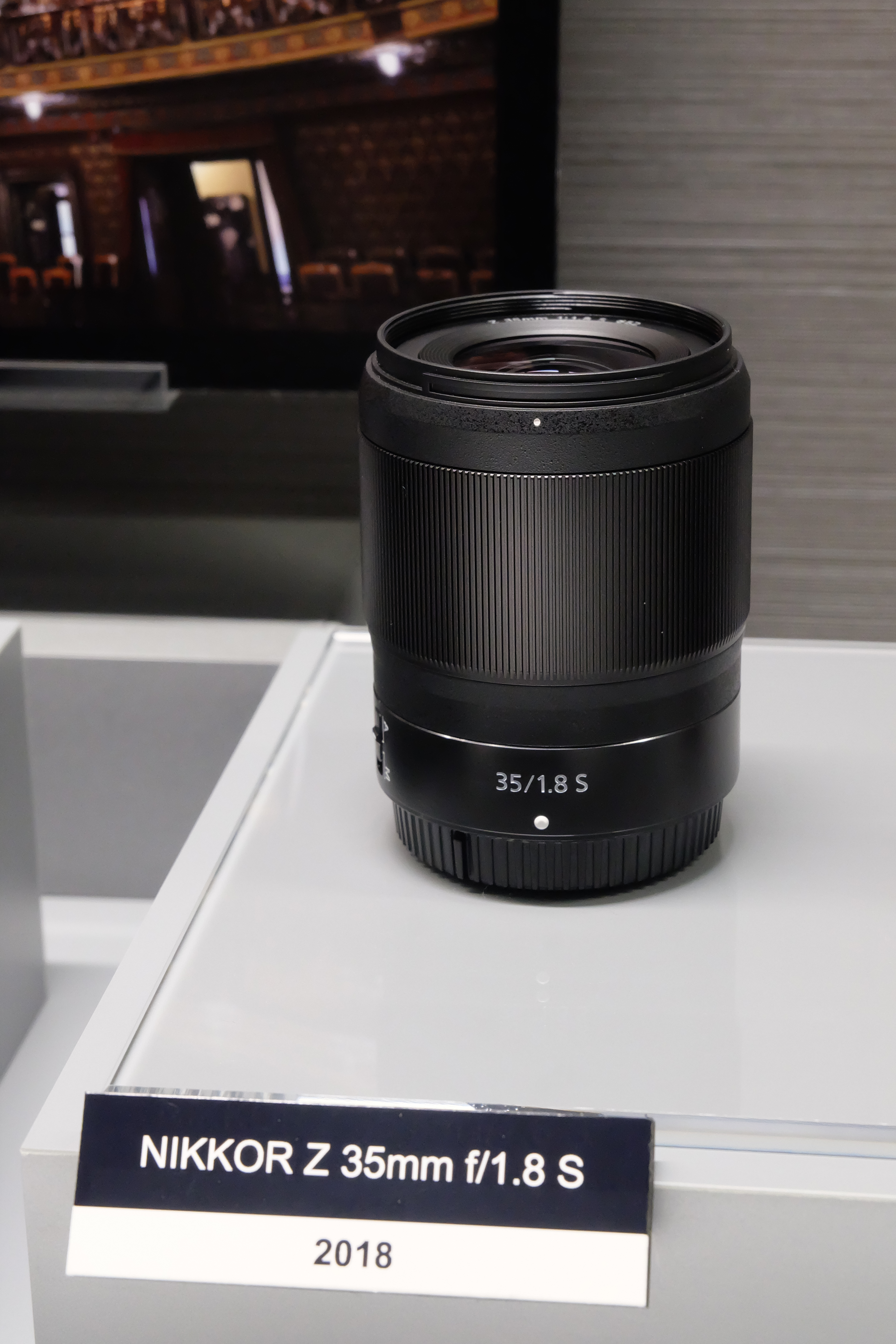
NIKKOR Z 35mm f1.8 S

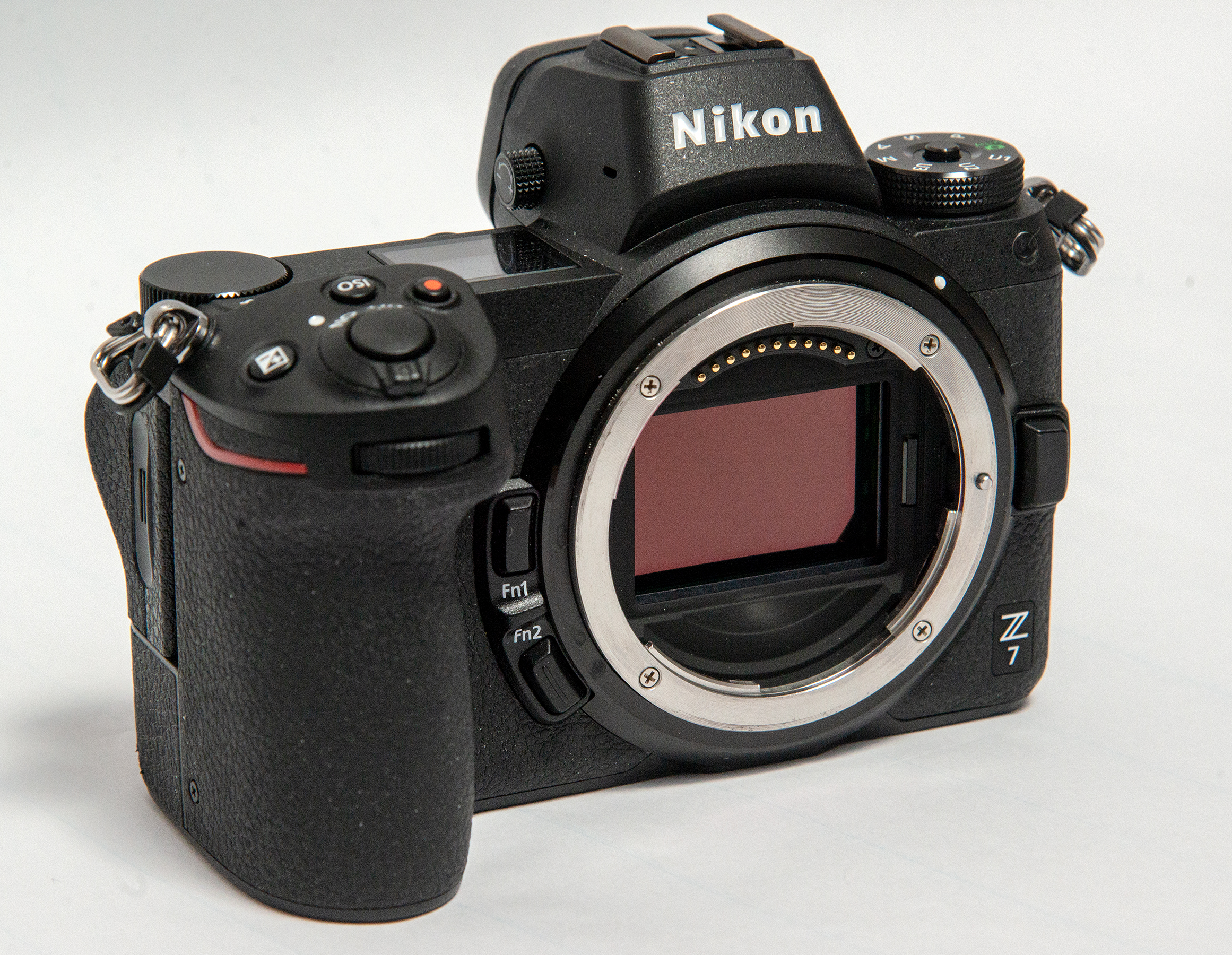
Z7 wide diameter lens mount and large sensor

== See also ==
- Nikon Z5
- Nikon Z6
- Nikon Z50

Sensor	Class	2018	2019	2020	2021	2022	2023	2024	2025	2026
FX (Full-frame)	Flagship					^{8K} Z9 ^{S}				
FX (Full-frame)	Flagship							^{8K} Z8 ^{S}		
FX (Full-frame)	Professional		^{4K} Z7 ^{S}		^{4K} Z7Ⅱ ^{S}					
FX (Full-frame)	Professional		^{4K} Z6 ^{S}		^{4K} Z6Ⅱ ^{S}				^{6K} Z6Ⅲ ^{S}	
FX (Full-frame)	Cinema									^{6K} ZR ^{S}
FX (Full-frame)	Enthusiast							^{4K} Zf ^{S}		
FX (Full-frame)	Enthusiast				^{4K} Z5 ^{S}					^{4K} Z5Ⅱ ^{S}
FX (Full-frame)	Entry-level									^{4K} Z5ⅡC ^{S}
DX (APS-C)	Enthusiast					^{4K} Zfc				
DX (APS-C)	Prosumer			^{4K} Z50					^{4K} Z50Ⅱ	
DX (APS-C)	Entry-level						^{4K} Z30			
Sensor	Class									
Sensor	Class	2018	2019	2020	2021	2022	2023	2024	2025	2026
