= Nikon Nikkor Z 35 mm f/1.8 S =

Nikkor Z 35 mm f/1.8 S
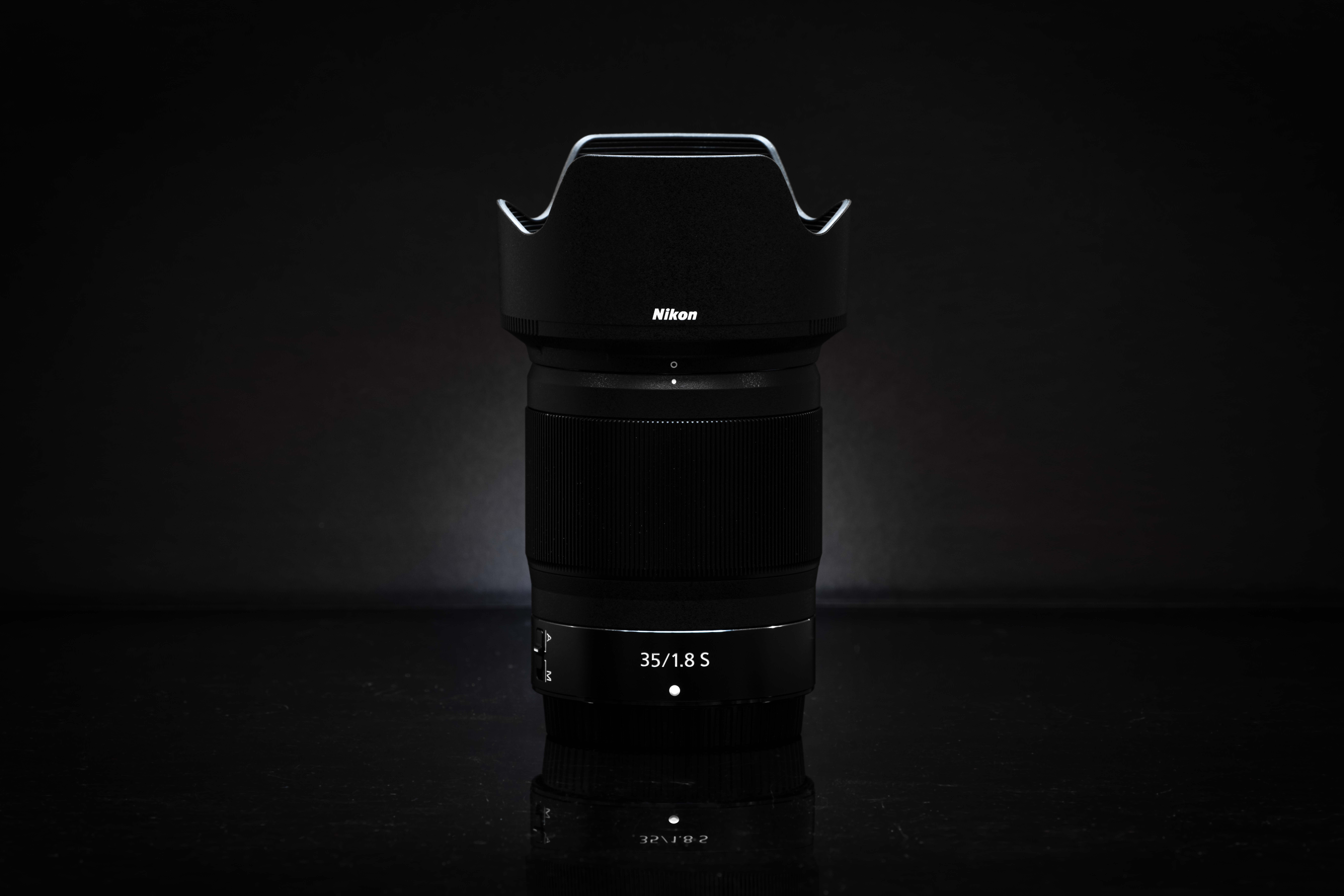
- Maker: Nikon
- Lens mount: Z-mount

Technical data
- Type: Prime
- Focus drive: Stepping motor
- Focal length: 35mm
- Image format: FX (full frame)
- Aperture (max/min): f/1.8–16
- Close focus distance: 0.25m
- Max. magnification: 1:5.3
- Diaphragm blades: 9 (rounded)
- Construction: 11 elements in 9 groups

Features
- Lens-based stabilization: No No
- Macro capable: No No
- Unique features: S-Line lens Nano Crystal Coat elements
- Application: Normal lens

Physical
- Max. length: 86 mm
- Diameter: 73 mm
- Weight: 370 g
- Filter diameter: 62 mm

Software
- Latest firmware: 1.10 (as of 20 December 2022)
- User flashable: Yes Yes
- Lens ID: 4

Accessories
- Lens hood: HB-89 (bayonet)
- Case: CL-C1

Angle of view
- Diagonal: 63° (FX); 44° (DX)

History
- Introduction: August 2018

Retail info
- MSRP: 849.95 USD (as of 2018)

The Nikon Nikkor Z 35 mm f/1.8 S is a full-frame prime lens manufactured by Nikon for use on Nikon Z-mount mirrorless cameras. It is one of the first three lenses announced for the Z-mount, introduced in 2018.

== Introduction ==
On August 23, 2018, Nikon announced the first three lenses for the Z-mount, one of which was the Nikkor Z 35 mm f/1.8 S (along with the Nikkor Z 24-70 mm f/4 S and Nikkor Z 50 mm f/1.8 S). The lens comes with a bayonet-type lens hood (HB-89).

The lens achieved a DXOMark score of 38.

== Features ==
- 35 mm focal length (approximately equivalent field of view of a 52.5 mm lens when used on a DX format camera)
- S-Line lens
- Autofocus using a stepping motor (STM), focus-by-wire manual focus ring
- 11 elements in 9 groups (including 2 ED glass and 3 aspherical lens elements and Nano Crystal Coat elements)
- 9-blade rounded diaphragm
- One customizable control ring (manual focusing by default, aperture, ISO and exposure compensation functions can be assigned to it)
- A/M switch for autofocus/manual focus modes
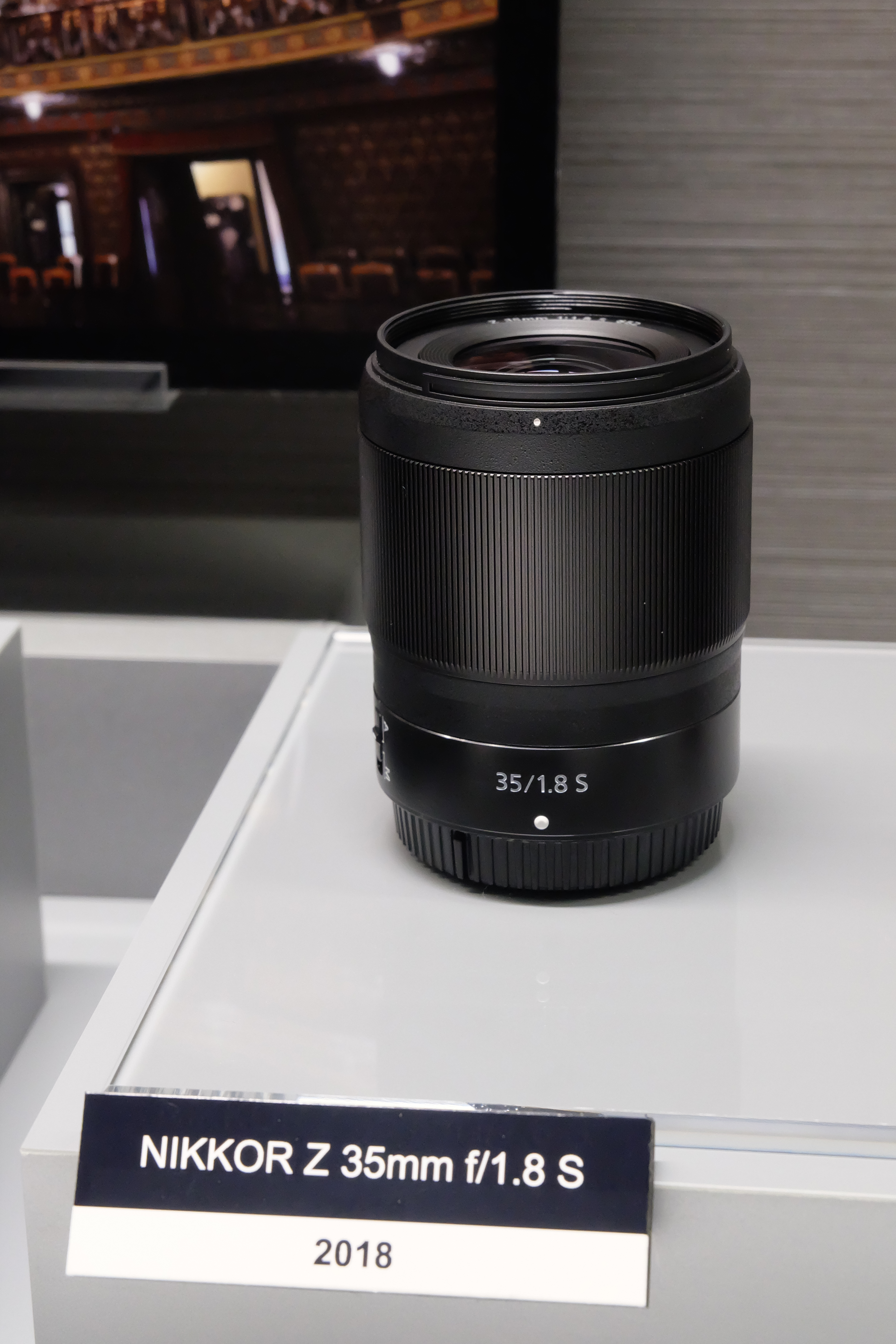
The lens on display

== Sample images ==
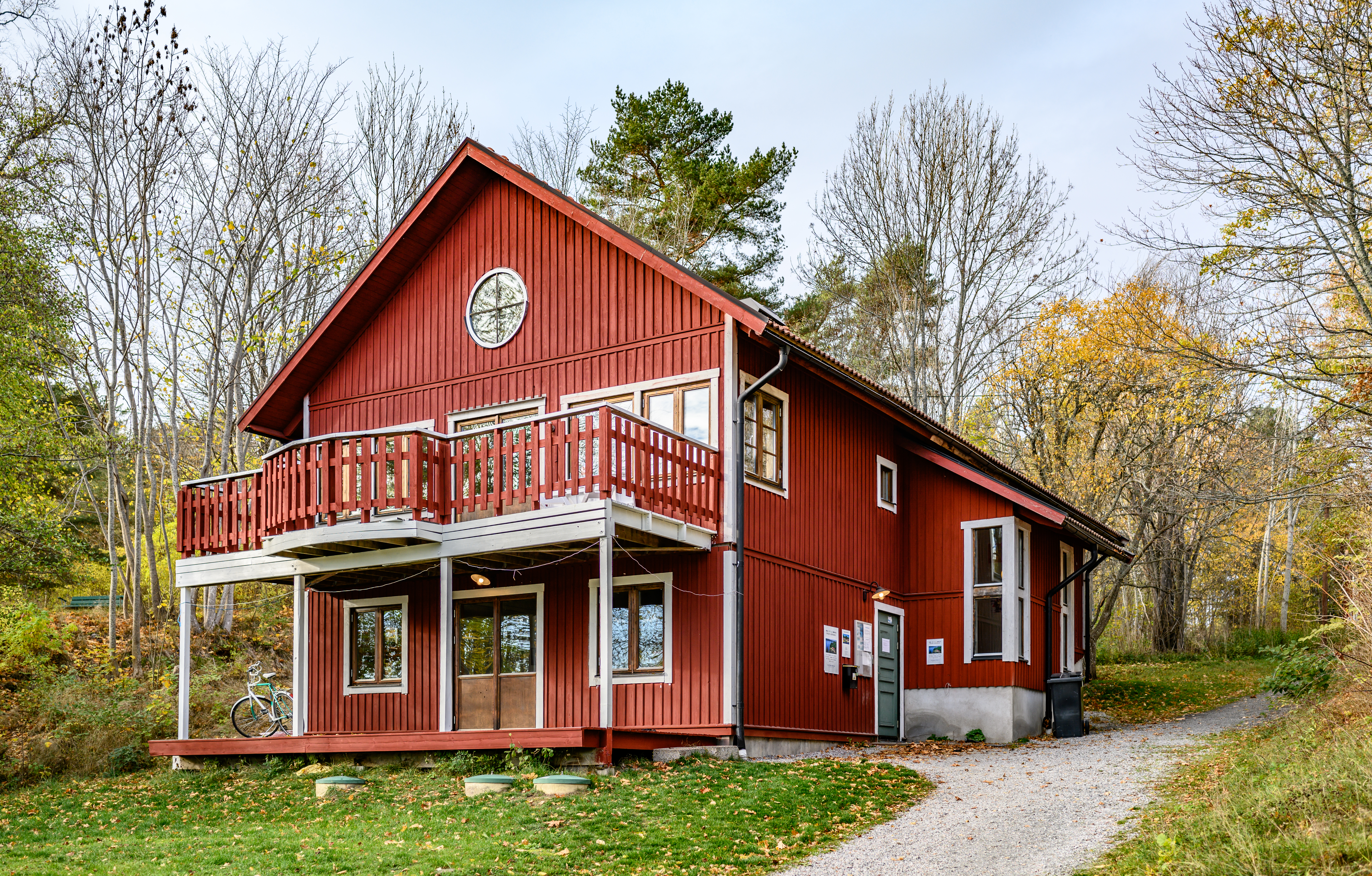
At f/2.8

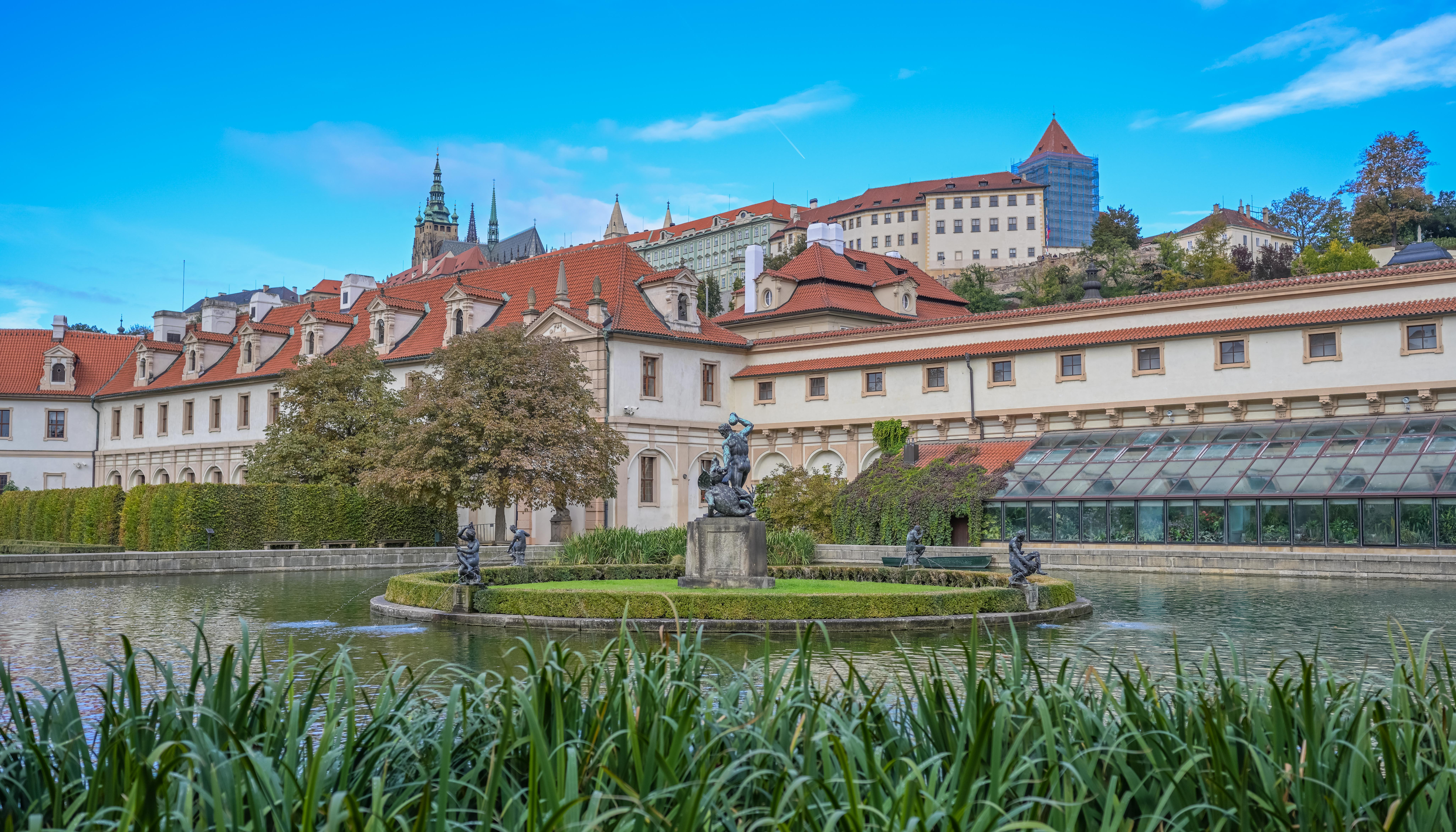
At f/2.8

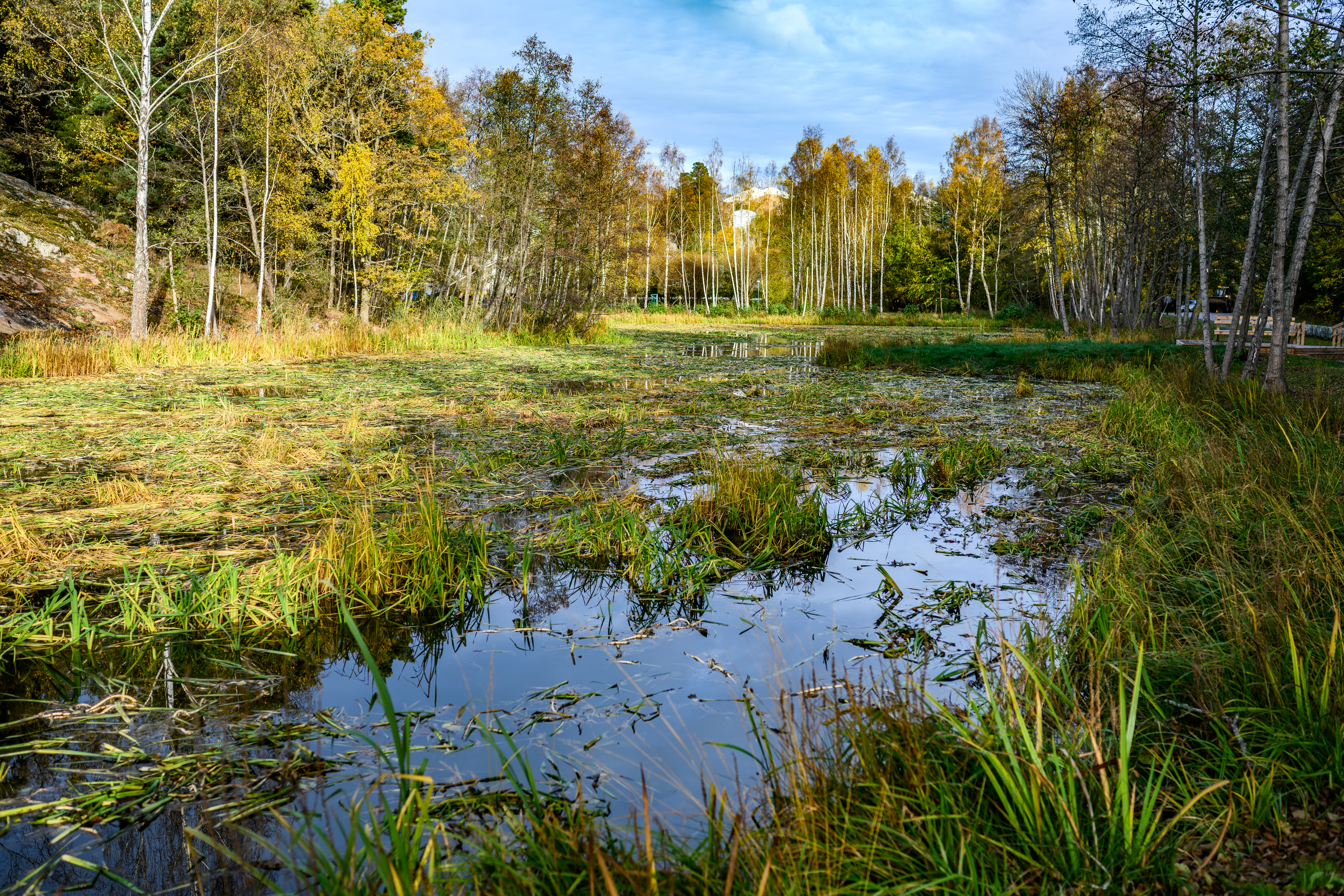
At f/2.8

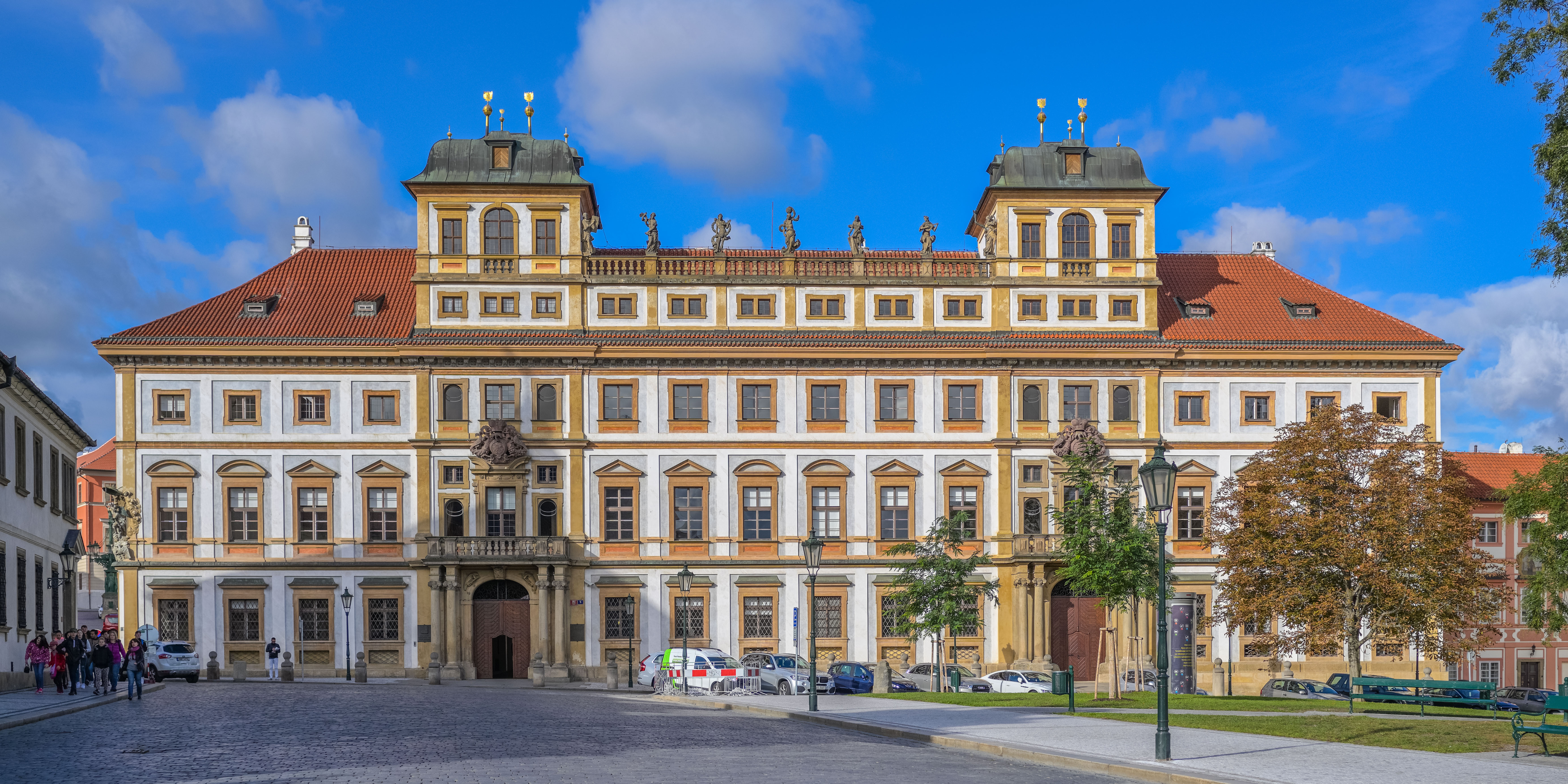
At f/2.8

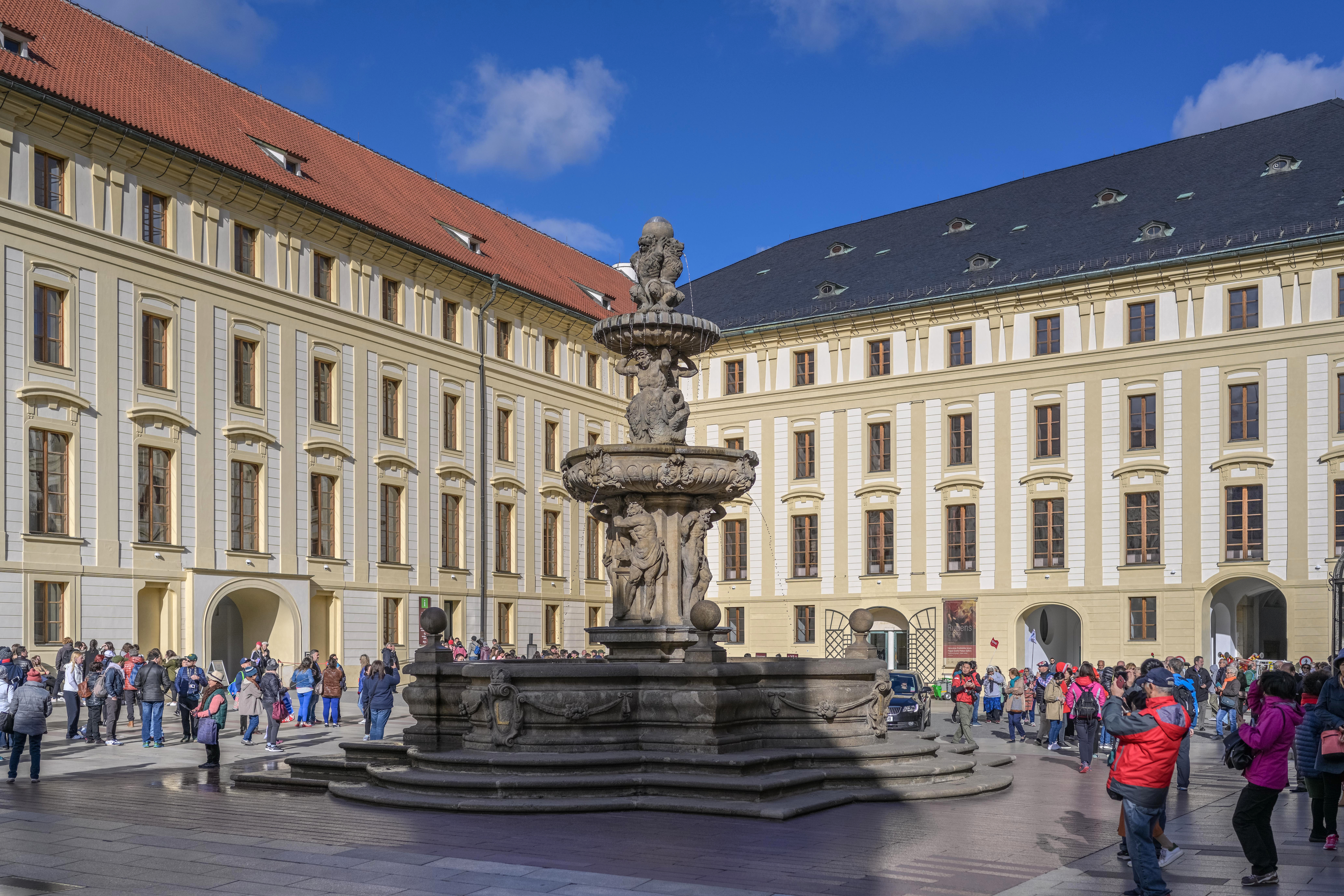
At f/3.2

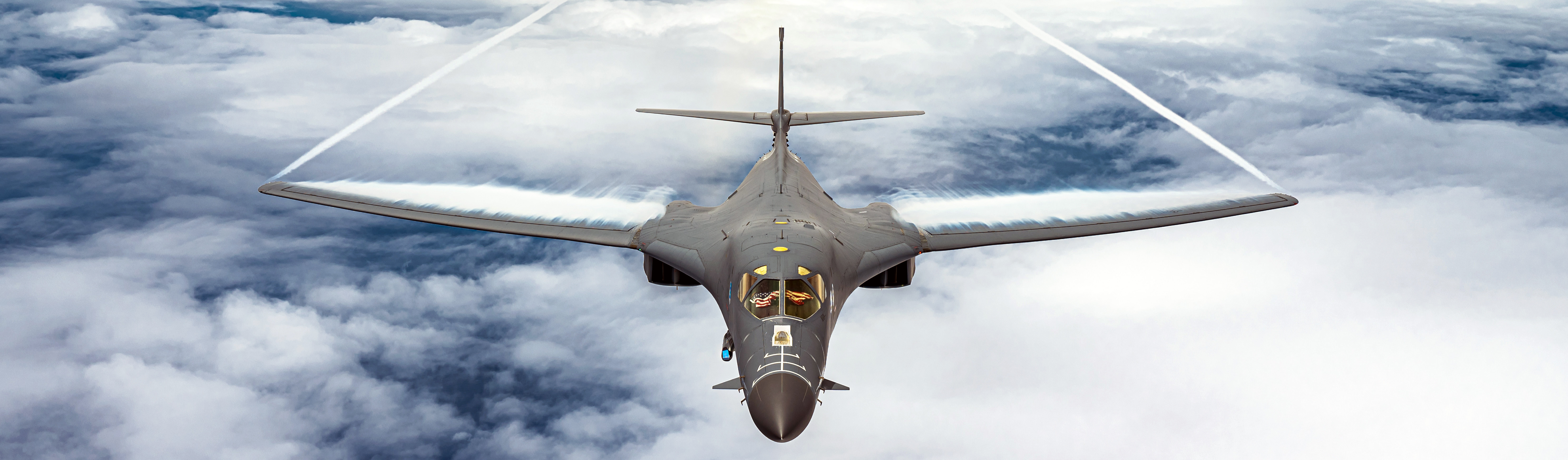
At f/7.1 (cropped)

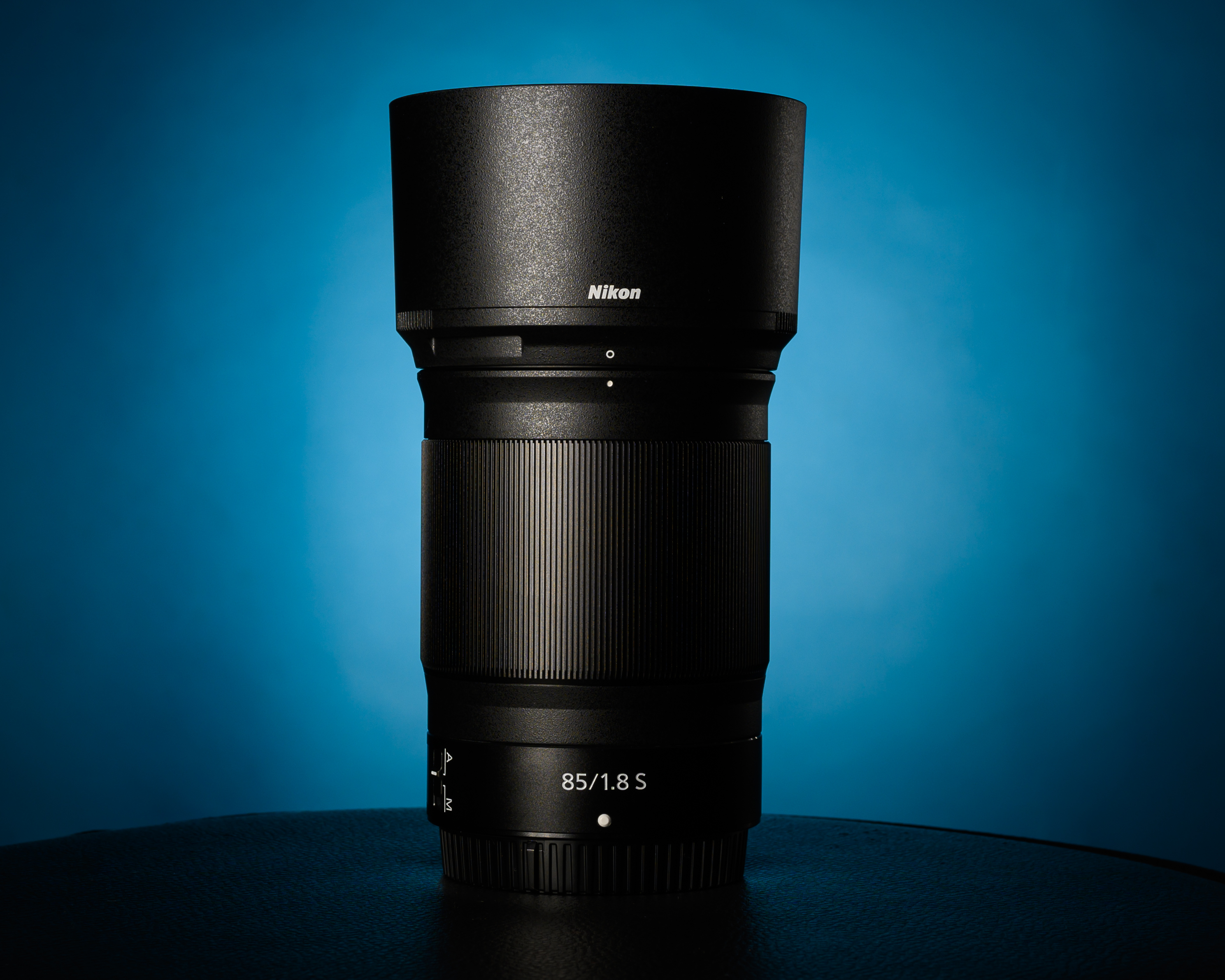
At f/9

== See also ==
- Nikon Z-mount
