= Nikon Z-mount =

Digital camera lens mount

- Type: Bayonet
- Inner diameter: 55 mm
- Tabs: 4
- Flange: 16 mm
- Connectors: 11 electrical pins
- Introduced: 2018
- Replaced: Nikon 1 series

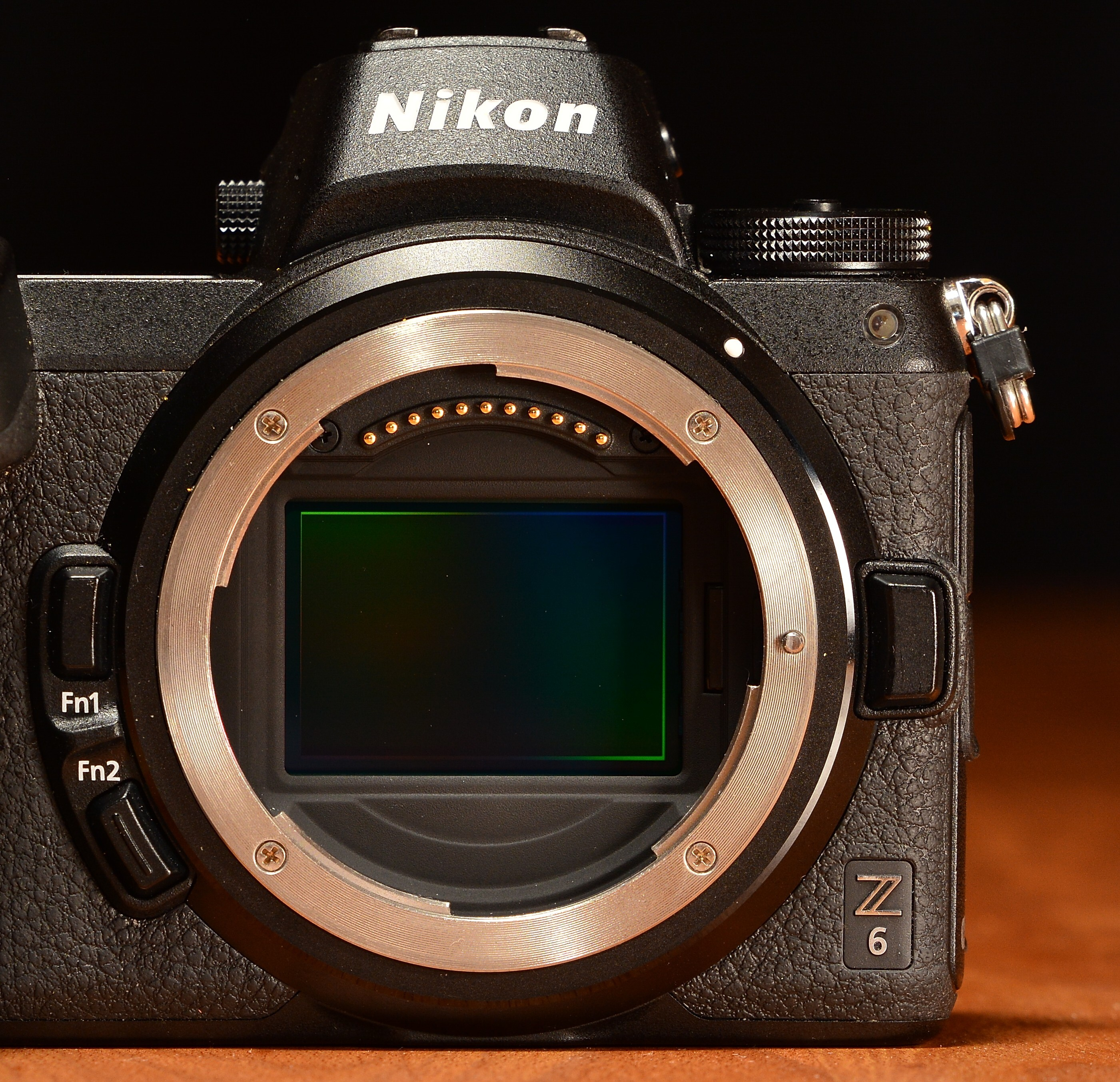
Nikon Z6 showing wide-diameter lens mount and full-frame sensor

Nikon Z-mount (stylized as $\mathbb{Z}$) is an interchangeable lens mount developed by Nikon for its mirrorless digital cameras.

When it was announced on August 23, 2018, Nikon released:

- the first two cameras (the Z7 and Z6), both of which were full-frame
- the first three lenses (the 24-70mm f/4 S, 35mm f/1.8 S, and 50mm f/1.8 S)
- a lens adapter to accept F-mount lenses (the FTZ)

With the introduction of the Z-mount, Nikon discontinued its previous mirrorless mount, the Nikon 1 series.

== Z-mount characteristics ==
=== Throat diameter ===
The 55 mm throat diameter of the Nikon Z-mount makes it the largest full-frame lens mount. It is much larger than the older Nikon F-mount (44 mm) and the 1-series, their first mirrorless mount (40 mm). It is also larger than the Sony mirrorless E-mount (46.1 mm), but only slightly larger than the 54 mm of both the Canon EF and RF mounts and of the 51.6 mm diameter full-frame mirrorless Leica L-Mount.

=== Flange distance ===
The Z-mount has a very short flange distance of 16 mm, which is shorter than all previously mentioned lens mounts (the 1-series was 17 mm). The shorter flange distance allows Nikon (and others) to build smaller and simpler lenses.

This flange distance, along with the large throat diameter, allows for numerous lenses of nearly all other current and previous mounts to be used with an appropriate lens mount adapter on a Z-mount camera (see Mount adapters for a list of mounts and adapters).

=== Lens contacts ===
The number of electrical contacts between the camera body and lens was increased from eight (on the F-mount) to eleven (on the Z-mount). These communicate lens information to the camera and provide power and instructions to the lens from the camera. There are no mechanical levers or plungers for communicating information.

=== Mount type and tabs ===
As on most interchangeable lens mount camera systems, the Z-mount uses a bayonet mount for attaching the lens to the camera. Nikon increased the number of tabs from three (on the F-mount and 1-mount) to four. This provides slightly more security on the mounted lens.

=== Lens formats: FX and DX ===
For its two sensor sizes, FX (Full-frame) and DX (APS-C), Nikon develops two varieties of lens. The two versions both use the Z-mount, and are mechanically and electronically identical. When mounted on the same camera type (i.e., an FX lens on an FX camera or a DX lens on a DX camera), a lens performs according to its nominal characteristics. When a DX lens is mounted on an FX camera, it causes the camera to use a crop mode from the center of the sensor, corresponding to the DX coverage of the lens. When an FX lens is mounted on a DX camera, it provides a 1.5x crop field of view, as is typical with an APS-C camera.

=== Lens mounting ===
Z-mount lenses lock (i.e., attach to the camera) by aligning the white dots on the camera body and lens and turning the lens counter-clockwise (when looking at the front of lens) until it clicks, signifying that it is locked. To unlock, the camera's Lens Release button is pressed and the lens is rotated clockwise.

== Z-mount cameras ==
=== Introduction of the cameras ===
With the introduction of the Z-mount, Nikon began designing and releasing new cameras for that mount. In late 2018, Nikon released the first two cameras (alongside three lenses and the original FTZ adapter) that use this mount, the full-frame Z7 and Z6, both using the then top‑of‑the‑line Expeed 6 image processor. A year later, in late 2019, Nikon announced their first Z-mount camera with an APS-C sensor, the Z50, also using the Expeed 6. In July 2020 the entry-level full-frame Z5 was introduced. In October 2020, Nikon announced the Z6II and Z7II, which succeed the Z6 and Z7, respectively. Both used dual Expeed 6 image processors. The APS-C lineup was expanded in July 2021, with the introduction of the retro-styled Zfc.

In October 2021, Nikon unveiled the Z9, which effectively succeeded the brand's flagship D6 DSLR. It was the first to use the Expeed 7 processor. The APS-C lineup was further expanded with the Z30, announced at the end of June 2022. 2023 brought the introduction of the Z8 and Zf, the second and third cameras to use the Expeed 7. The Z6III was announced in June 2024. In November 2024, Nikon announced the Z50II as a major upgrade of the Z50; it became the first APS-C camera to use the Expeed 7 processor introduced with the Z9. In April 2025, Nikon announced the Z5II as a major upgrade for its lowest class full-frame line of cameras. In September 2025, Nikon announced the first camera of its "Z Cinema" line, the ZR, co-designed with RED. The ZR is the first Nikon camera that internally offers the 12-bit R3D NE raw video codec (Redcode Raw with TicoRAW). In September 2026, Nikon announced the full-frame Z5IIC, stating that it has “user-friendly features for first-time mirrorless camera users.”

=== Camera overview ===
The following table contains the specifications for all sixteen Nikon Z-mount cameras, including models that have been discontinued. The three Red cinema cameras with Z-mounts are shown in the following section.

All Z-mount cameras can use all Z-mount lenses, operating as described in Lens formats. In addition, they can also use Nikon F-mount lenses through the use of an FTZ II adapter.

Camera		Years		Sensor			LCD			EVF	Expeed	Card slots (Note: All SD card slots are UHS-II, except for the Z30, Z50, and Zfc, which are UHS-I. All microSD slots, as on the Zf and ZR, are UHS-I.) (Note: CFX (CFexpress) card slots are backwards-compatible to XQD cards.)	Continuous release fps	Wt. g	Video fps (Note: If a video recording mode results in a crop, it is given as a footnote after the fps value.) (Note: The supported video frame rates are: 24/25/30 fps when up to 30 fps are supported, while cameras supporting up to 60 fps also support 50 fps recording. Cameras supporting up to 120 fps also support 100 fps recording. Cameras supporting 100/120 fps recording can also record in x4/x5 slow motion directly (targeting 24/25/30 fps video frame rates), which means playback of the resulting video file is already in slow motion, without the need for editing.) (Note: The Z50, Zfc, Z5, Z6, Z6II, Z7, and Z7II have a 30-minute length limitation for internal recording; all others have longer durations, which vary by settings. External recording time for all camera is only limited by battery life.) (Note: In 6K & 8K, "no" means camera theoretically could, but does not support; "n/a" means camera doesn't have enough pixels to support)				Video color depth			Ref
Type (Note: Type of Camera FX - Full-frame sensor DX - APS-C sensor)	Model	Intro	Disc (Note: Year Discontinued ★ - Currently in production (green background) 20xx - Year discontinued (red background))	Type (Note: Type of Imaging Sensor S - Stacked BSI P - Partially Stacked BSI B - BSI)	MP	IBIS	Type (Note: Type of Articulating screen F - Fully Articulating Touchsscreen M - Multi-hinged / Dual-axis Tilting Touchscreen T - Tilting Touchscreen)	Size	Dots	EVF	Expeed	Card slots	Continuous release fps	Wt. g	1080p	4K	6K	8K	8-bit	10-bit	12-bit	Ref
DX (APS-C)	Z30	2022	★	B	20.9	No	F	3.0"	1.04 M	No	6	SD	11	405	120	30	n/a	n/a	Yes	No	No	
DX (APS-C)	Z50	2019	2024	B	20.9	No	T	3.2"	1.04 M	Yes	6	SD	11	450	120	30	n/a	n/a	Yes	No	No	
DX (APS-C)	Z50II	2024	★	B	20.9	No	F	3.2"	1.04 M	Yes	7	SD	11; 30 (JPEG)	550	120	30; 60 (Note: At this frame rate, there is a 1.5× crop.)	n/a	n/a	Yes	Yes	No	
DX (APS-C)	Zfc	2021	★	B	20.9	No	F	3.2"	1.04 M	Yes	6	SD	11	445	120	30	n/a	n/a	Yes	No	No	
FX (full frame)	Z5	2020	★	B	24.3	Yes	T	3.2"	1.04 M	Yes	6	SD×2	4.5	675	60	30 (Note: At this frame rate, there is a 1.7× crop.)	No	n/a	Yes	No	No	
FX (full frame)	Z5II	2025	★	B	24.5	Yes	F	3.2"	2.10 M	Yes	7	SD×2	11; 30 (JPEG)	700	120	30; 60	No	n/a	Yes	Yes	RAW: (Note: The camera's 12-bit video recording supports the Raw format N-RAW.)	
FX (full frame)	Z5IIC	2026	★	B	24.5	Yes	F	3.2"	2.10 M	No	7	SD	11; 30 (JPEG)	620	120	30; 60	No	n/a	Yes	Yes	RAW:	
FX (full frame)	Zf	2023	★	B	24.5	Yes	F	3.2"	2.10 M	Yes	7	SD + microSD	14	710	120	30; 60	No	n/a	Yes	Yes	No	
FX (full frame)	Z6	2018	2022	B	24.5	Yes	T	3.2"	2.10 M	Yes	6	CFX	12	675	120	30	No	n/a	Yes	HDMI (Note: 10-bit output can be recorded with an external HDMI recorder. External 10-bit recording can optionally use N-Log, a profile for recording video. The Z6II, Z6III, and Z7II also support external recording of 10-bit hybrid log gamma (HLG) video.)	Upgrade (Note: 12-bit output requires a compatible recorder and is a paid upgrade. The extra-cost 12-bit upgrade enables external recording of 12-bit ProRes RAW. The resulting footage has greater dynamic range than 8- or 10-bit footage. However, the camera uses pixel skipping (which is necessary since ProRes RAW directly stores non-debayered sensor data) resulting in a somewhat softer image with more noise and more frequent appearance of moiré patterns compared to the full-width downsampling 8- and 10-bit modes.)	
FX (full frame)	Z6II	2020	★	B	24.5	Yes	T	3.2"	2.10 M	Yes	6^{×2}	CFX + SD	14	705	120	30; 60	No	n/a	Yes	HDMI	Upgrade	
FX (full frame)	Z6III	2024	★	P	24.5	Yes	F	3.2"	2.10 M	Yes	7	CFX + SD	20 (RAW); 60 (JPEG); 120 (11 MP)	760	240	60; 120	60	n/a	Yes	Yes	RAW: (Note: The camera's 12-bit video recording supports the Raw format ProRes RAW HQ.)	
FX (full frame)	ZR	2025	★	P	24.5	Yes	F	4.0"	3.07 M	No	7	CFX + microSD	20 (RAW); 60 (JPEG); 120 (11 MP)	630	240	60; 120	60	n/a	Yes	Yes	RAW: (Note: The camera's 12-bit video recording supports the Raw format R3D NE.)	
FX (full frame)	Z7	2018	2022	B	45.7	Yes	T	3.2"	2.10 M	Yes	6	CFX	9	675	120	30	No	No	Yes	HDMI	Upgrade	
FX (full frame)	Z7II	2020	★	B	45.7	Yes	T	3.2"	2.10 M	Yes	6^{×2}	CFX + SD	10	705	120	30; 60 (Note: At this frame rate, there is a 1.08× crop.)	No	No	Yes	HDMI	Upgrade	
FX (full frame)	Z8	2023	★	S	45.7	Yes	M	3.2"	2.10 M	Yes	7	CFX + SD	20 (RAW); 30 (JPEG); 60 (19 MP); 120 (11 MP)	910	120	120	No	60	Yes	Yes	RAW:	
FX (full frame)	Z9	2021	★	S	45.7	Yes	M	3.2"	2.10 M	Yes	7	CFX×2	20 (RAW); 30 (JPEG); 60 (19 MP); 120 (11 MP)	1340	120	120	No	60	Yes	Yes	RAW:	

=== Red cinema cameras ===
In 2024, Red Digital Cinema was acquired by Nikon. On 12 February 2025, the first two cinema cameras using the Z-mount, the V-RAPTOR [X] and the KOMODO-X, were released. On 9 September 2025, Red released the V‑RAPTOR XE, also offering a Z-mount version besides the RF-mount variant. Along with the ZR, they are all part of the Z Cinema line.

Red cinema cameras with a Z-mount can use all Z-mount lenses, although some lenses may have greater than normal distortion and/or light falloff, as the VV sensor is slightly wider than an FX sensor. In addition to Z-mount lenses, Red cinema cameras can also use Nikon F-mount lenses through the use of an FTZ II adapter, with the same issues as Z-mount lenses.

The following table contains abbreviated specifications for the three Nikon Red Z-mount cameras. Fuller specifications are in the tables on the List of Red Digital Cinema cameras page.

RED Digital Cinema cameras using Z-mount
Model	Years		Sensor			Ref
Model	Intro	Disc (Note: Year Discontinued ★ - Currently in production (green background) 20xx - Year discontinued (red background))	Size	Res	Shutter	Ref
RED V-RAPTOR [X] Z mount	2025	★	VV/LF	8K	Global shutter	
RED KOMODO-X Z mount	2025	★	Super 35	6K	Global shutter	
RED V-RAPTOR XE Z mount	2025	★	VV/LF	8K	Global shutter	

=== Camera gallery ===
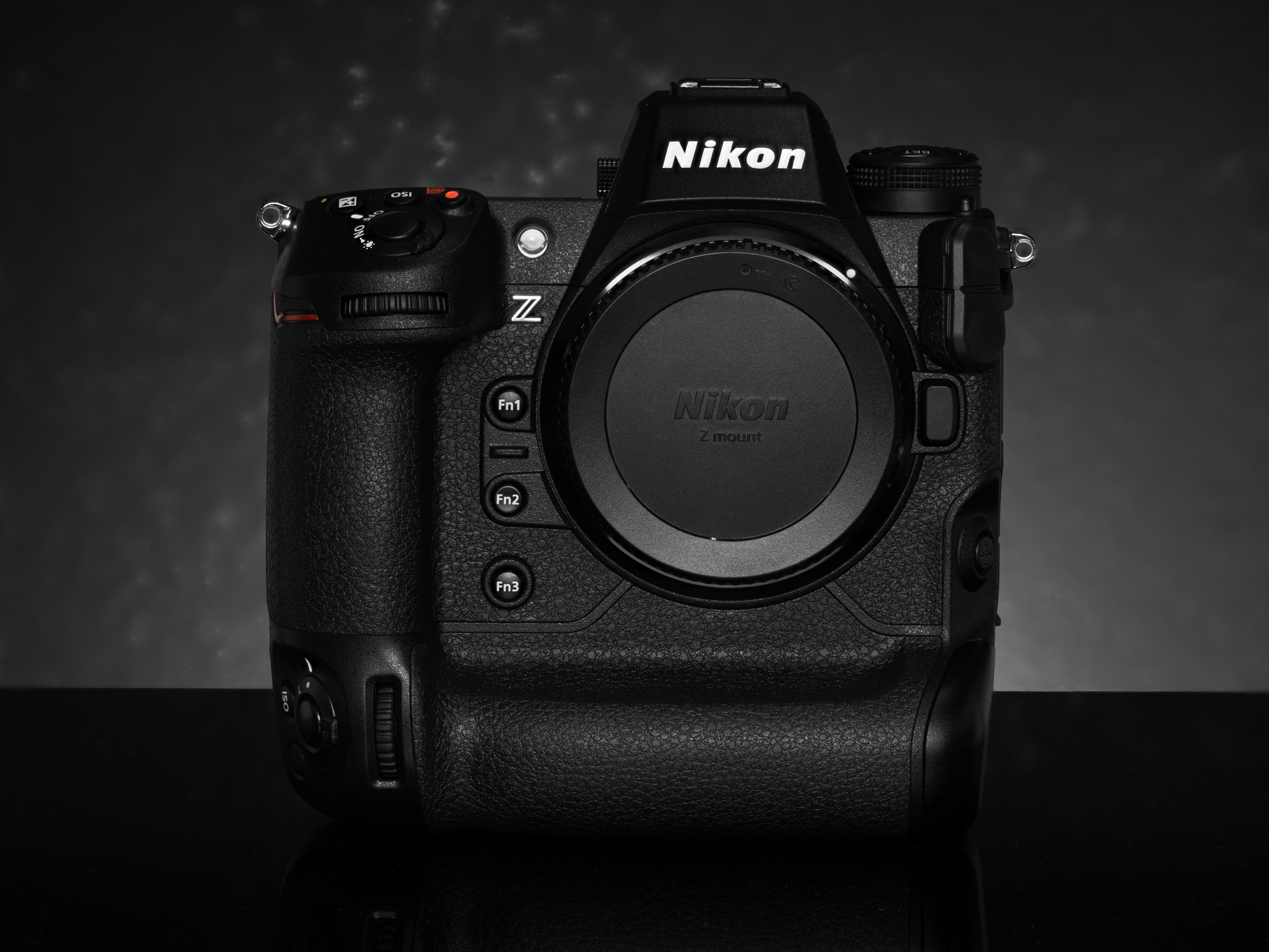
Nikon Z9

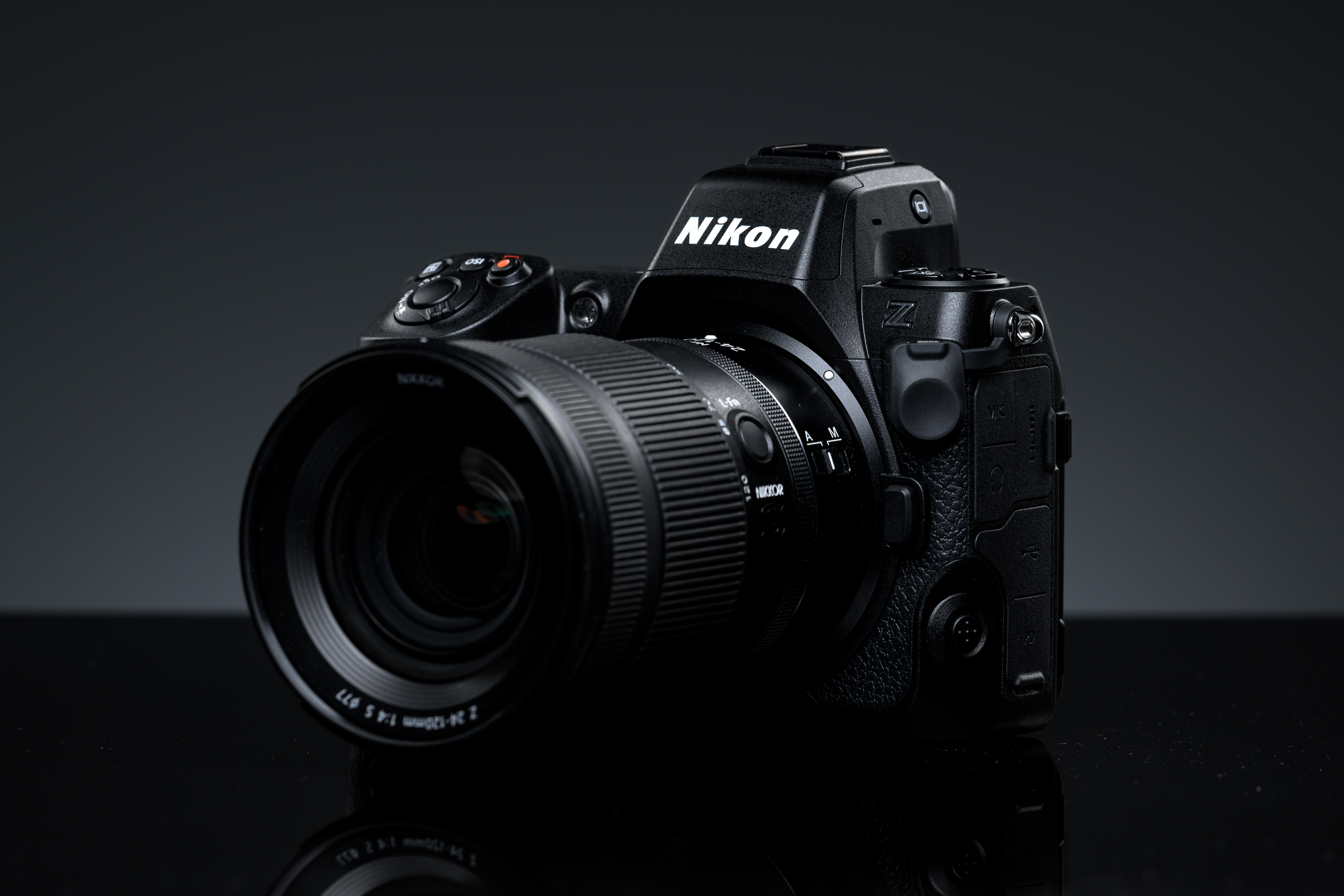
Nikon Z8 + Z 24-120 mm f/4 S

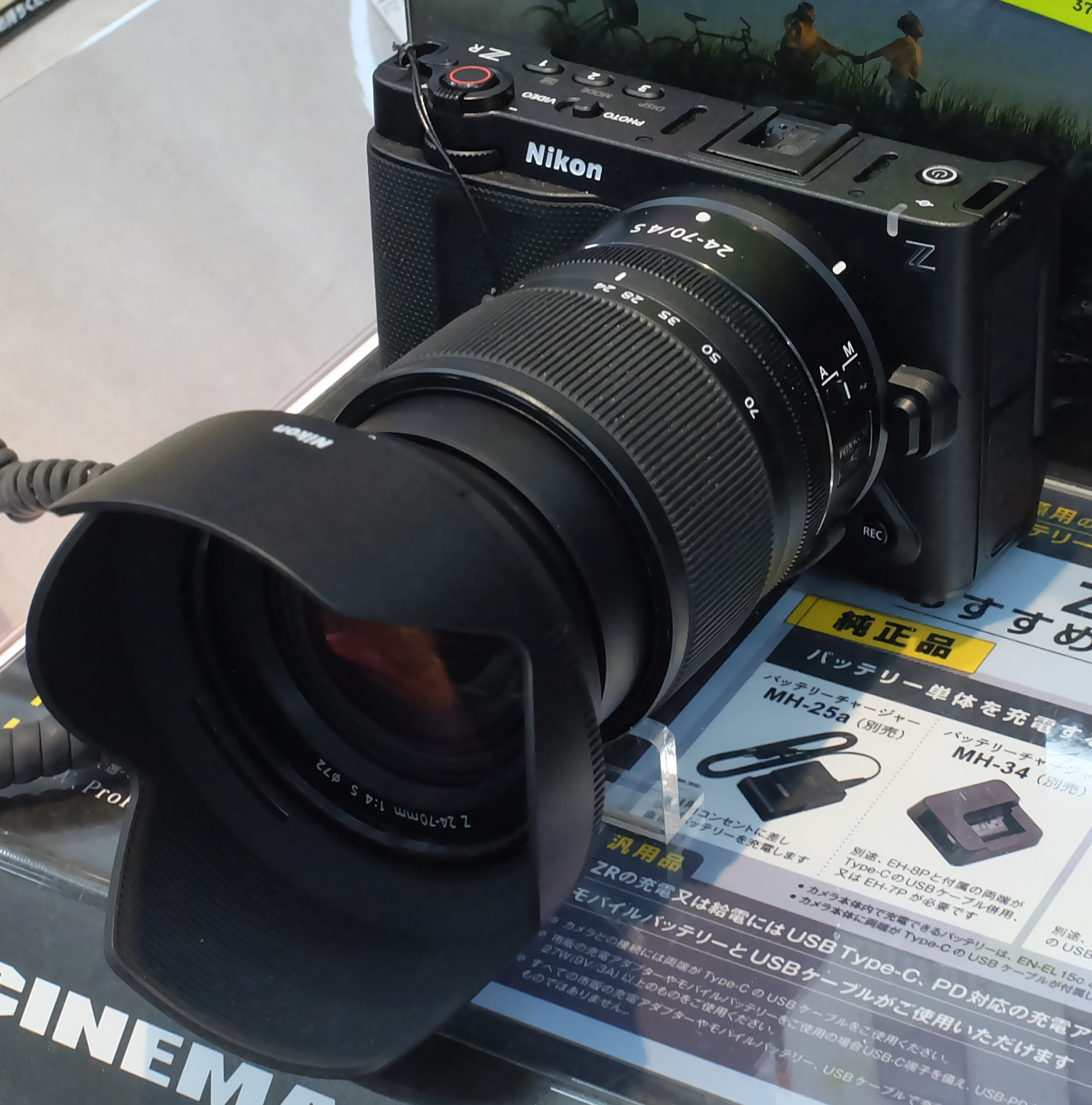
Nikon ZR + Z 24-70 mm f/4 S

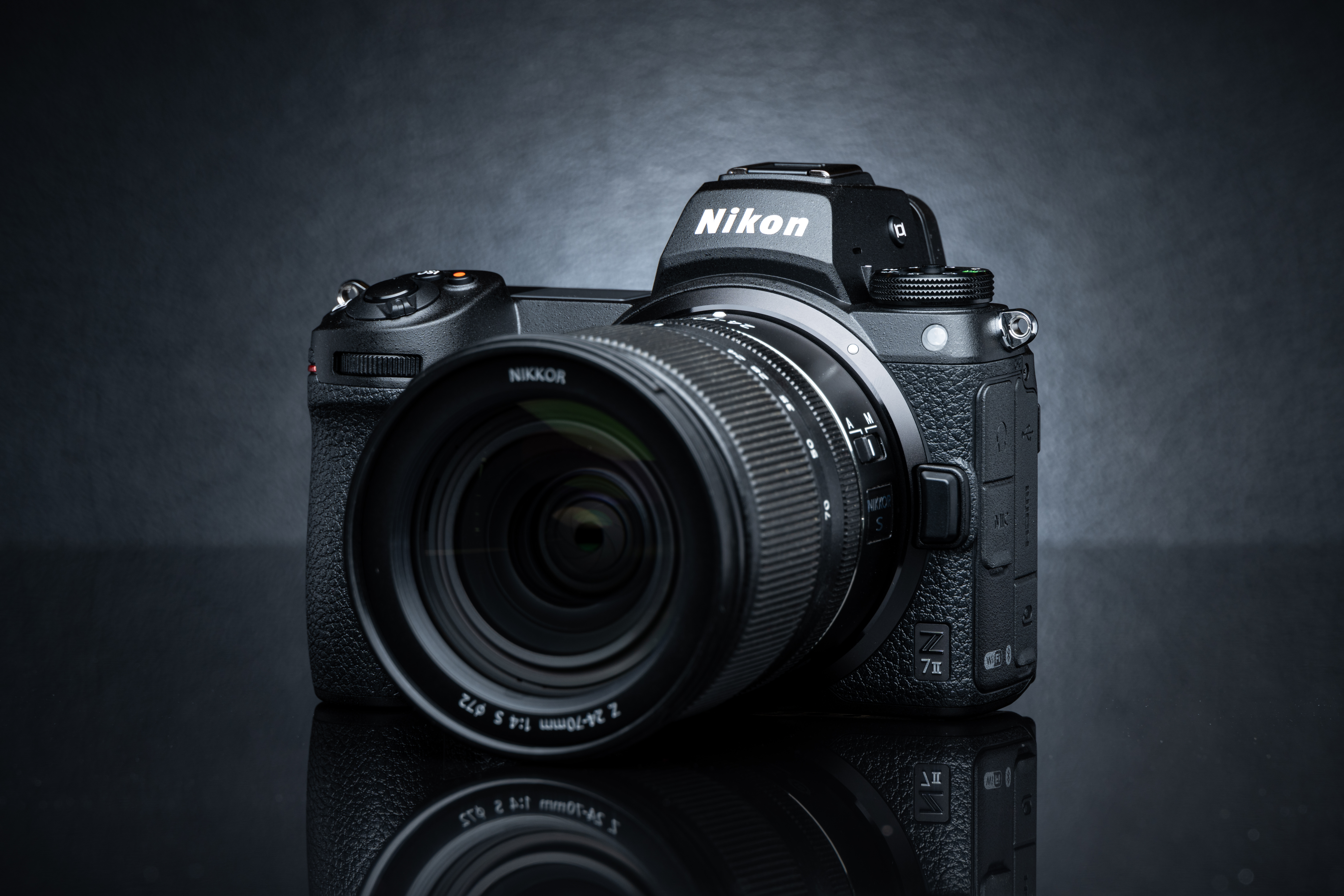
Nikon Z7II + Z 24-70 mm f/4 S

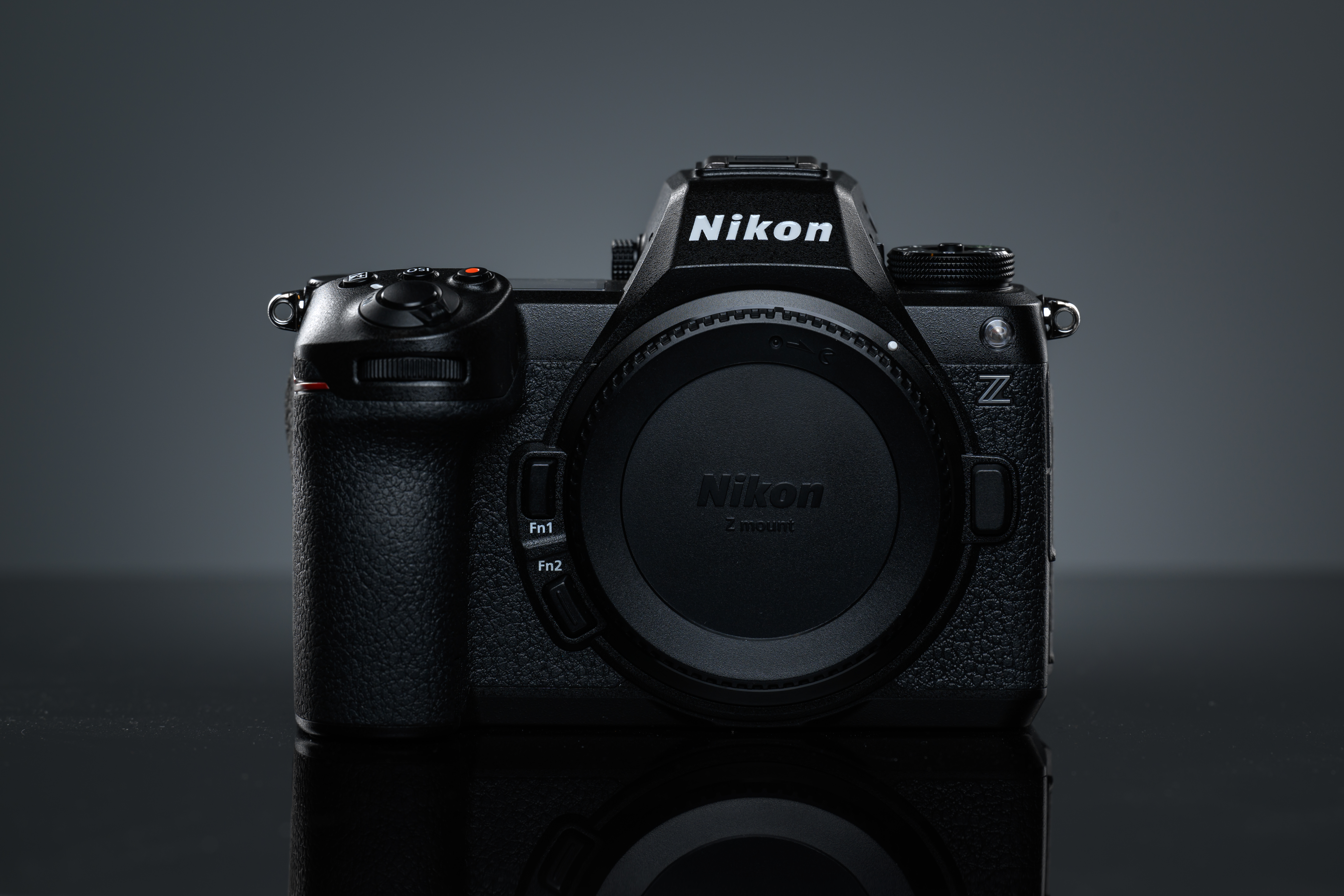
Nikon Z6III

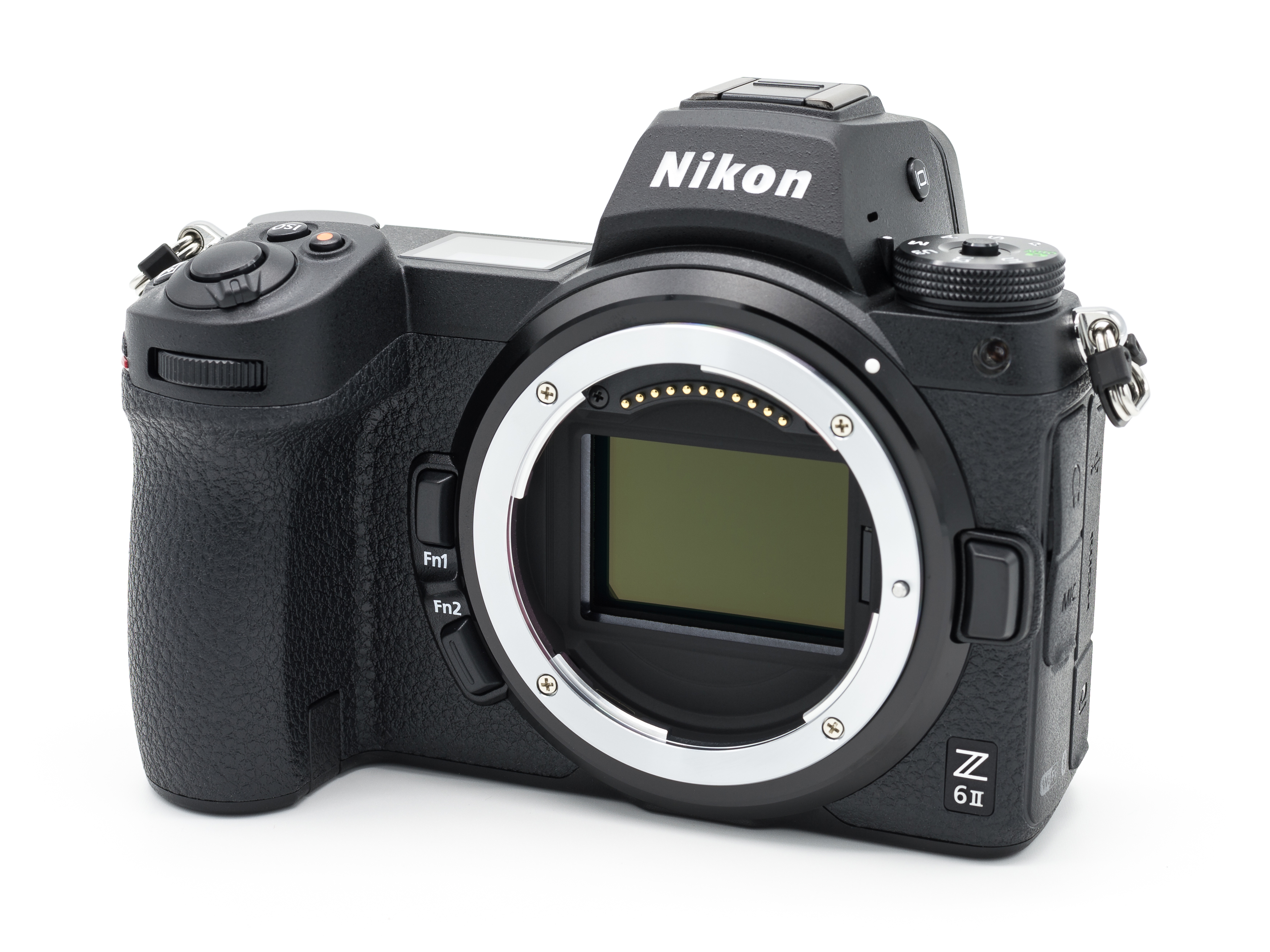
Nikon Z6II

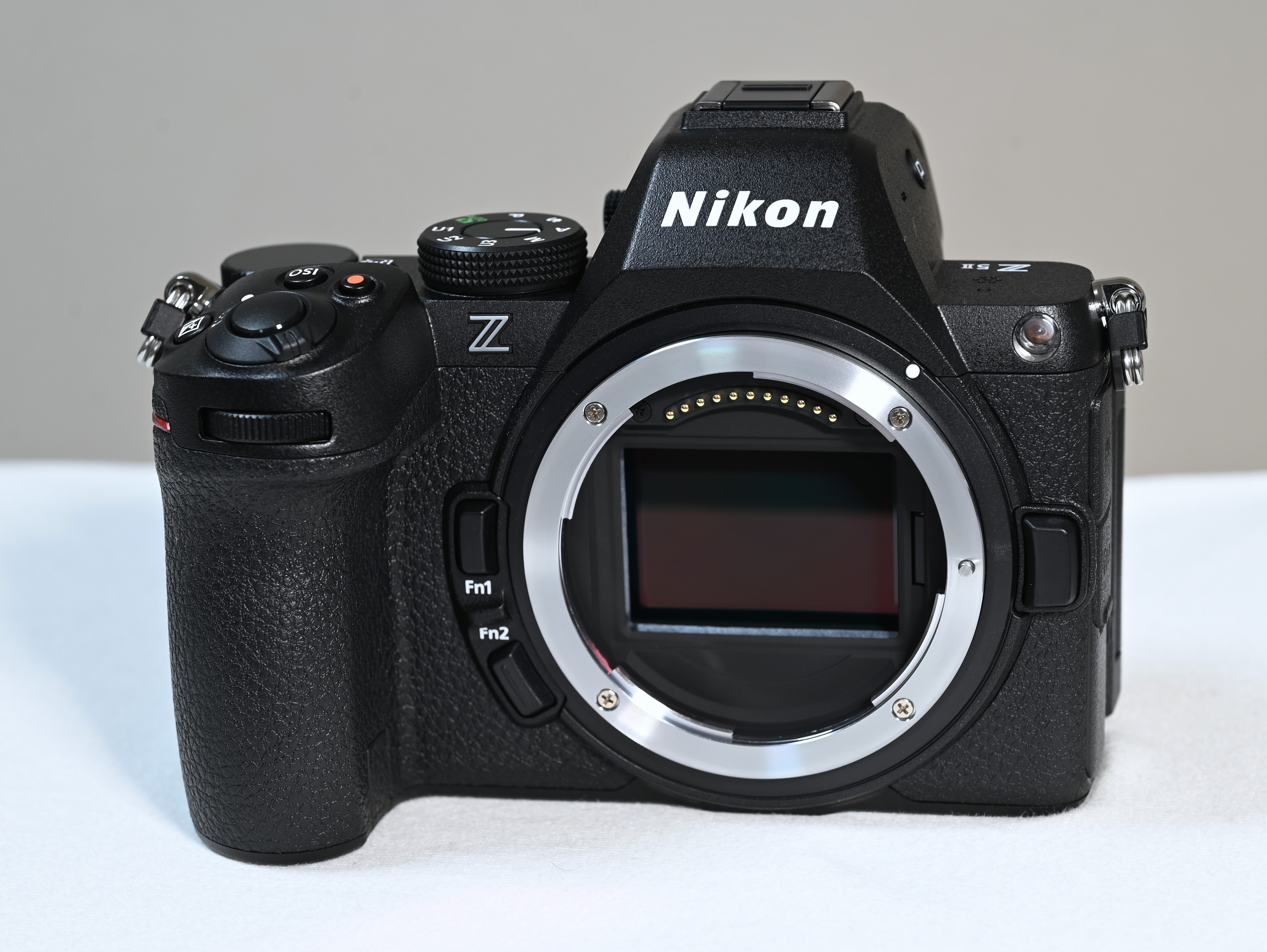
Nikon Z5II

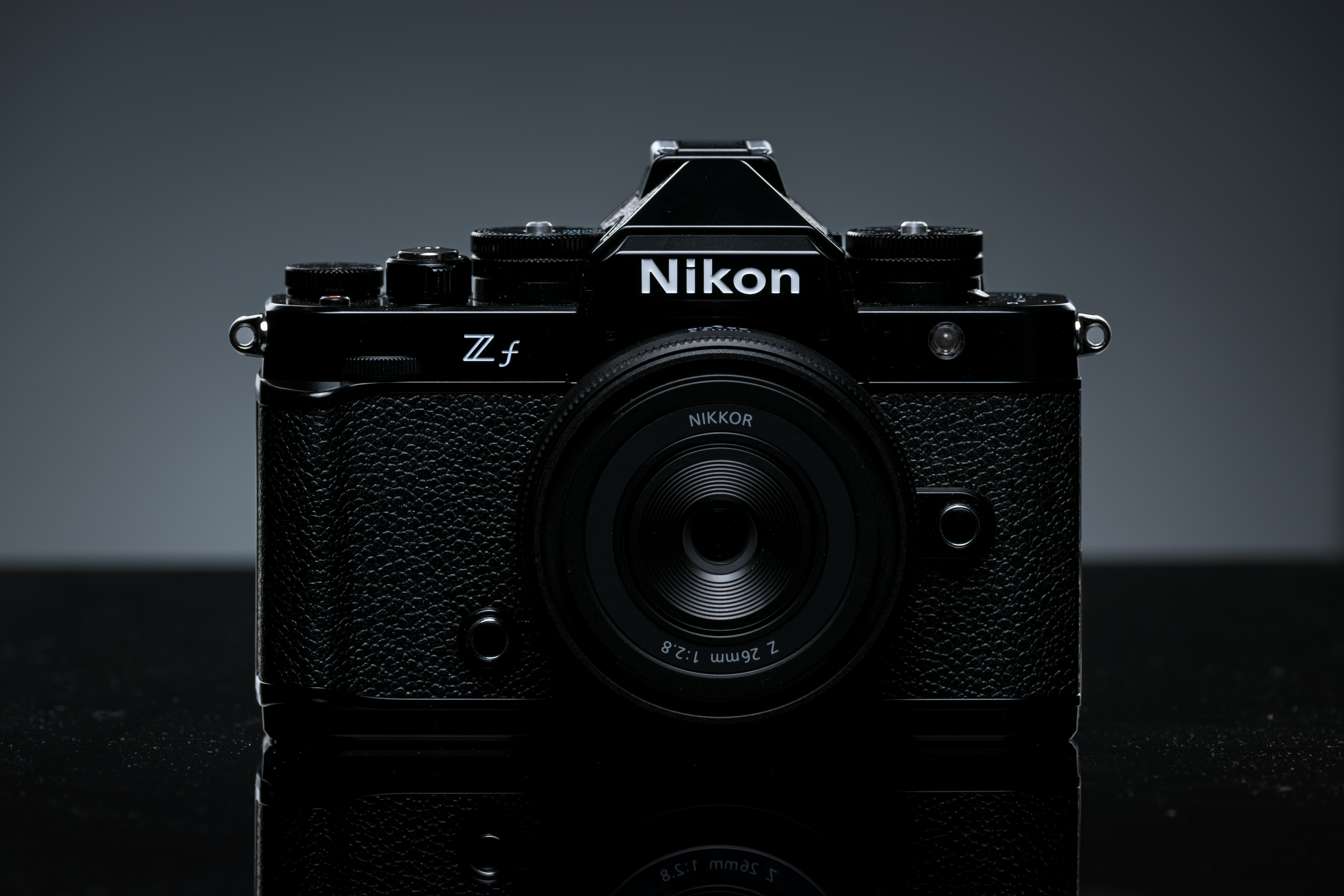
Nikon Zf + Z 26 mm f/2.8

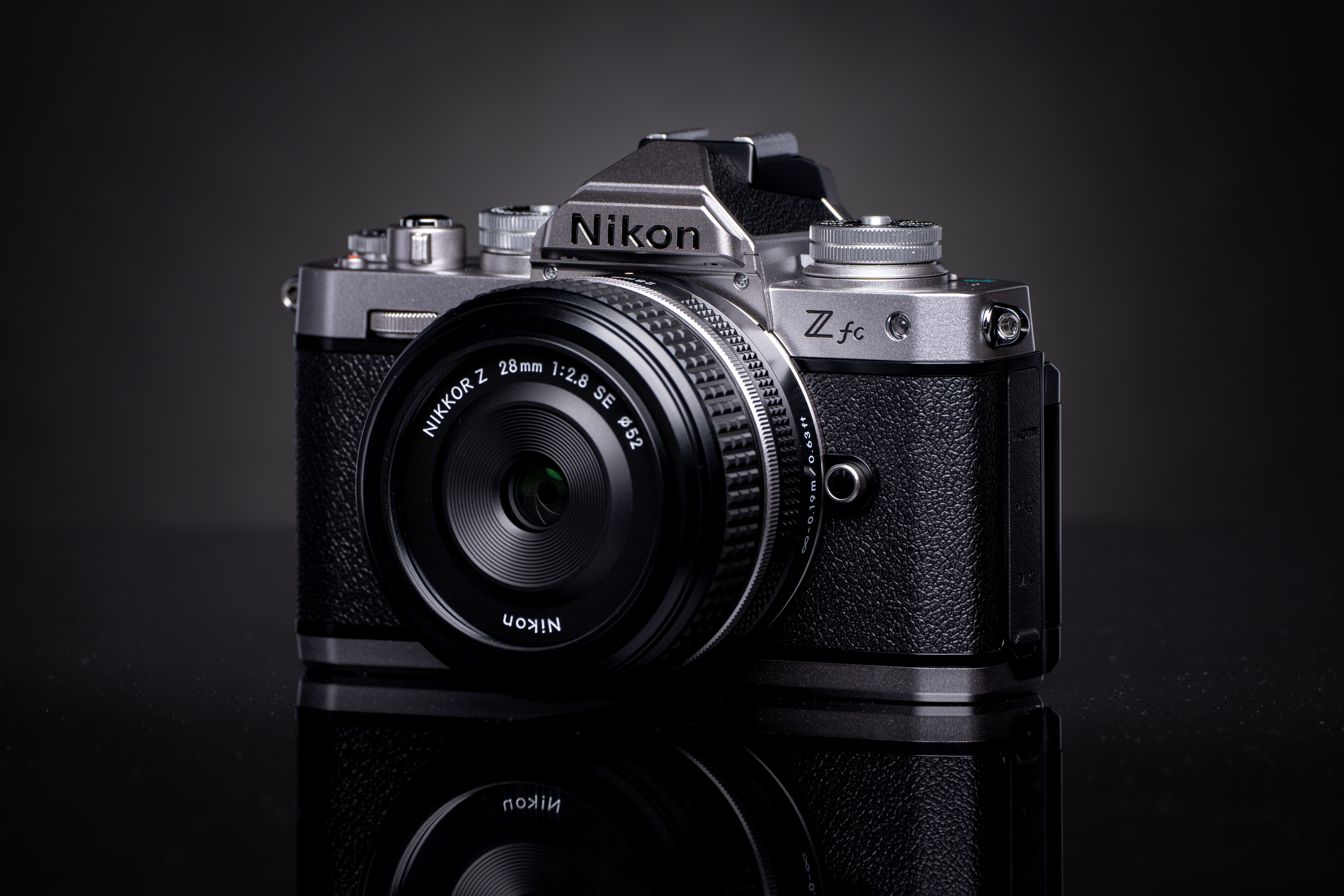
Nikon Zfc + Z 28 mm f/2.8 SE

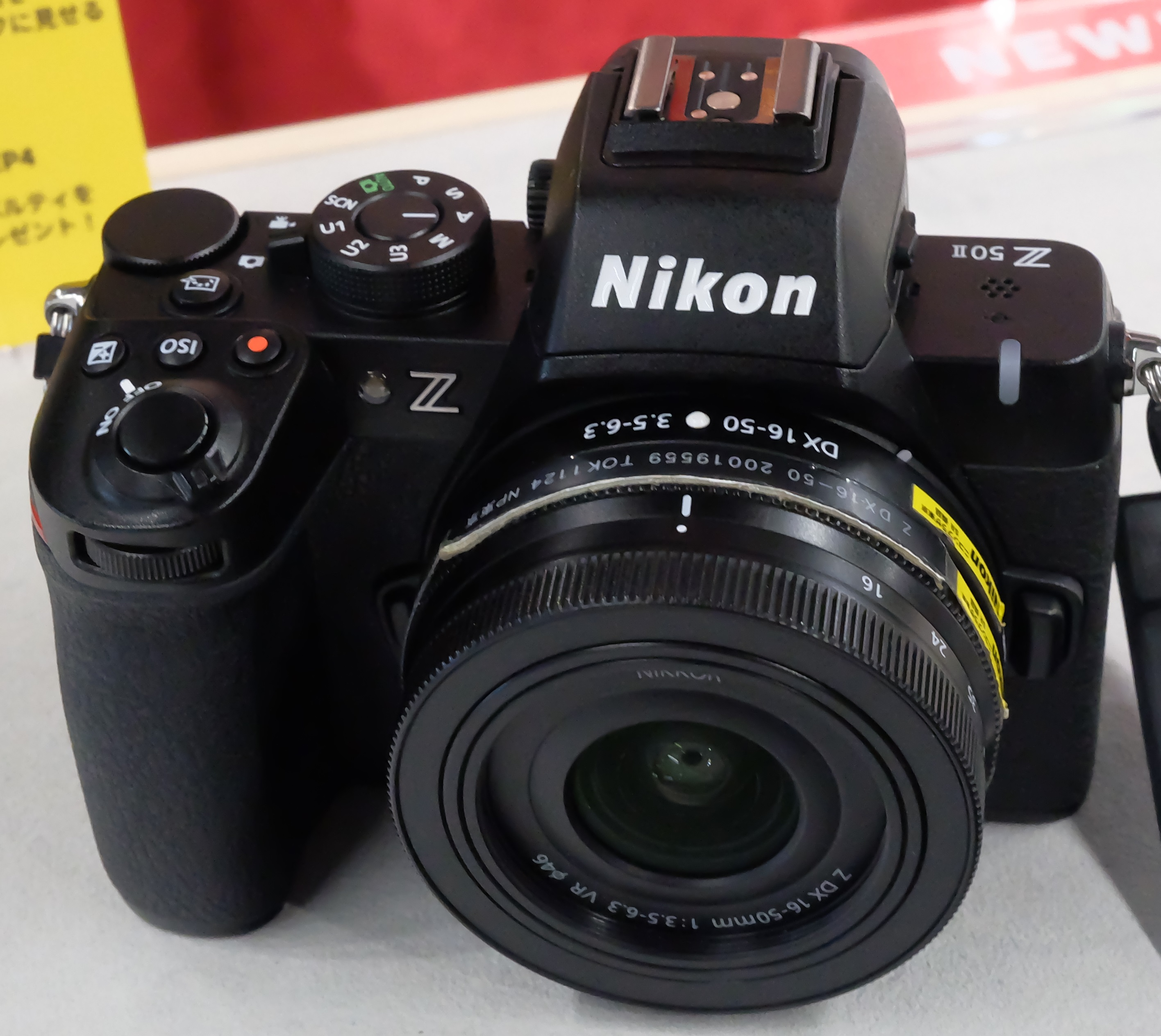
Nikon Z50II +
Z DX 16-50 mm f/3.5-6.3 VR

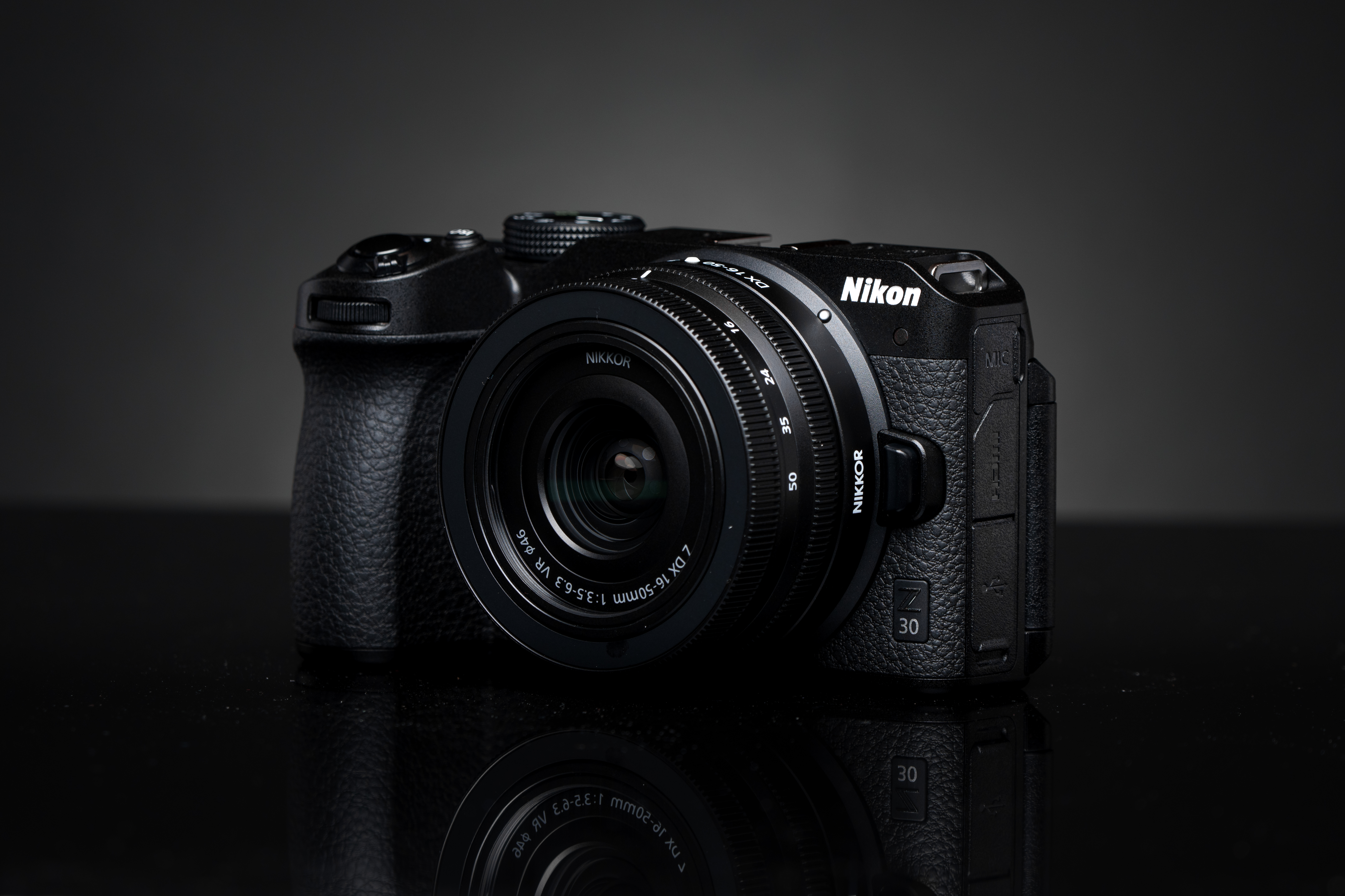
Nikon Z30 + Z DX 16-50 mm f/3.5-6.3 VR

== Z-mount lenses ==
With the introduction of the Z-mount, Nikon began designing and releasing a new set of lens for that mount. For its two sensor sizes, FX (Full-frame) and DX (APS-C), Nikon develops two varieties of lens. The two versions both use the Z-mount, and are mechanically and electronically identical. When mounted on the same camera type (i.e., an FX lens on an FX camera or a DX lens on a DX camera), a lens performs according to its nominal characteristics. When a DX lens is mounted on an FX camera, it causes the camera to use a crop mode from the center of the sensor, corresponding to the DX coverage of the lens. When an FX lens is mounted on a DX camera, it provides a 1.5x crop field of view, as is typical with an APS-C camera.

Nikon published a roadmap outlining forthcoming lenses when the Z-mount system was initially announced. The roadmap has been updated multiple times. As of February 2025, all lenses in the last version of the roadmap from September 2023 were released. Several lenses which were not indicated on the roadmap were released as well.

In 2018, Nikon announced the development of the Z-mount 58 mm f/0.95 S Noct lens, reintroducing the Noct brand, which was historically used by Nikon for lenses with ultra-fast maximum apertures. The lens was released in October 2019.

On 30 October 2024, Nikon announced that it was developing a video-centric, standard zoom lens with power zoom, the NIKKOR Z 28-135mm f/4 PZ. On 13 February 2025, the details of the lens were released, alongside the announcement of the first two RED Digital Cinema cinema cameras with Z-mounts, the V-Raptor [X] and Komodo-X.

On 12 September 2025, Nikon teased and confirmed the development of a line of "Z Cinema" lenses, without disclosing specific lens series or model details. Half a year later, on 19 April 2026, Nikon published a video teaser for the lens series. On 8 September 2026, the company confirmed nine T1.9 cinema lenses covering a range of focal lengths, all part of the "Nikkor Z Cinema T1.9 VV" series. The lenses are featuring an image circle larger than full-frame, that can cover the V-Raptor [X] VV sensor (40.96 mm × 21.60 mm). At the time of the announcement, out of the nine lenses, the first and only lens model confirmed is the Nikkor Z Cinema 50mm T1.9 VV.

=== Lens designations ===
All of Nikon's Z-mount lenses are Nikkors, which has been Nikon's brand for their lenses since 1932.

In their labeling of lenses, each lens shows two numbers, giving the focal length and aperture.

- The focal length (in mm) is listed first (before the aperture) and is shown as either just a number (e.g., "35") or a number followed by an mm (e.g., "105mm").
- This is followed by the aperture value(s), with one of the following used, based on the specific lens and its characteristics:
  - F-stop: aperture number (e.g., "1.9") or range of numbers (e.g., "3.5-6.3") is shown.
  - T-stop: aperture number starting with a T followed by the aperture number (e.g., "T1.9").

In addition to the focal length and aperture, Nikon uses a new designation system (i.e., various tags) for their Z-mount lenses. The older F-mount Nikkor designations are no longer used, though they overlap in some areas (e.g., the VR and DX labels). Of particular interest, Nikon introduced the S (for S-Line) branding for especially high-performance ("superior") lenses, which is akin to Canon's L designation or Sony's G or GM branding.

Nikkor Z lens designations
Tag	Meaning	Description
	FX	Lens without a DX or VV tag is FX. Lens covers the full-frame image circle.: DX cameras apply a 1.5x crop factor when using the lens.; VV cameras (Red cinema) do not automatically switch modes.
DX	APS-C	Lens only covers the DX image circle.: FX cameras automatically switch to DX crop mode when using the lens.; VV cameras (Red cinema) do not automatically switch modes.
II	2nd Gen	Second generation or version of that specific lens.
MC	Macro	Macro lens with 1:1 magnification.
Noct	Nocturnal/ Nocturne	Very large aperture of f/0.95
PF	Phase Fresnel	Nikon branding for telephoto lenses using diffractive elements to minimize chromatic aberration. Replaces several lens elements with one PF element, reducing the size and weight of a lens.
Plena	—	Lens with a fully circular bokeh effect across the entire image frame, along with excellent brightness and sharpness
PZ	Power zoom	Motorized zoom function to be used with controls on lens, camera, remote, or app.
S	S-Line	High-end lens. Not associated with any particular function, but S-Line lenses have almost no drop in sharpness when shooting wide open, exceling at edge-to-edge sharpness.
SE	Special Edition	FX lens with exterior design matching the Nikon Zf and Zfc cameras, resembling a design from the classic Nikkor lenses released around the same time as the Nikon FM2 film SLR camera.
SL	Silver Edition	DX lens with exterior silver design matching the Nikon Zf and Zfc cameras, similar in design to an SE. The lens body is silver, but the letters SL do not appear on it.
TC	Teleconverter	Switchable 1.4x teleconverter built into the lens.
VR	Vibration Reduction	Lens uses a moving optical group to reduce the photographic effects of camera shake.
VV	VistaVision	Lens that is part of the Nikkor Z Cinema line. The image circle is larger than full-frame, covering the V-Raptor [X] VV sensor.
Z	Z-mount	Lens built for Nikon's mirrorless Z-mount system

=== Lens lines ===
The Nikkor Z line-up has several distinct lines of lenses, which are designed with similar handling and optical characteristics.

Nikkor Z lens lines
Line	Lenses	Description
Holy Trinity	Nikkor Z 14–24 mm f/2.8 S; Nikkor Z 24–70 mm f/2.8 S II; Nikkor Z 70–200 mm f/2.8 VR S II	Professional S-Line f/2.8 zooms
Economical Trinity	Nikkor Z 17–28 mm f/2.8; Nikkor Z 28–75 mm f/2.8; Nikkor Z 70–180 mm f/2.8	These are adapted Tamron designs offering less wide-angle, less reach and no VR, but at a substantially lower cost. Due to this trade-off, they are not part of the S-line.
Lightweight Trinity	Nikkor Z 14–30 mm f/4 S; Nikkor Z 24–70 mm f/4 S; Nikkor Z 24–120 mm f/4 S	A series of S-Line f/4 zoom lenses covering the ultra-wide to tele range.
Compact Primes	Nikkor Z DX 24 mm f/1.7; Nikkor Z 26 mm f/2.8; Nikkor Z 28 mm f/2.8 SE; Nikkor Z 28 mm f/2.8; Nikkor Z 40 mm f/2; Nikkor Z 40 mm f/2 SE	Emphasizing smaller size and portability
Ultra-fast Primes	Nikkor Z 35 mm f/1.2 S; Nikkor Z 50 mm f/1.2 S; Nikkor Z 85 mm f/1.2 S	The f/1.2 S line of ultra-fast primes feature almost identical size and weight and all have the same 82mm filter size.
Fast Primes	Nikkor Z 35 mm f/1.4; Nikkor Z 50 mm f/1.4	The f/1.4 line of fast primes are designed for hybrid (photo/video) shooters; these lenses have characteristic rendering instead of perfect aberration control as implemented in the S-line lenses.
Superior Primes	Nikkor Z 20 mm f/1.8 S; Nikkor Z 24 mm f/1.8 S; Nikkor Z 35 mm f/1.8 S; Nikkor Z 50 mm f/1.8 S; Nikkor Z 85 mm f/1.8 S; Nikkor Z 135 mm f/1.8 S Plena	The f/1.8 S line of primes are known for superior image quality
Premium Super-Telephoto	Nikkor Z 400 mm f/2.8 TC VR S (integrated 1.4x teleconverter); Nikkor Z 400 mm f/4.5 VR S; Nikkor Z 600 mm f/4 TC VR S (integrated 1.4x teleconverter); Nikkor Z 600 mm f/6.3 VR S PF; Nikkor Z 800 mm f/6.3 VR S PF	All of these lenses have the same control scheme and the same set of lens control buttons.

=== Teleconverters ===
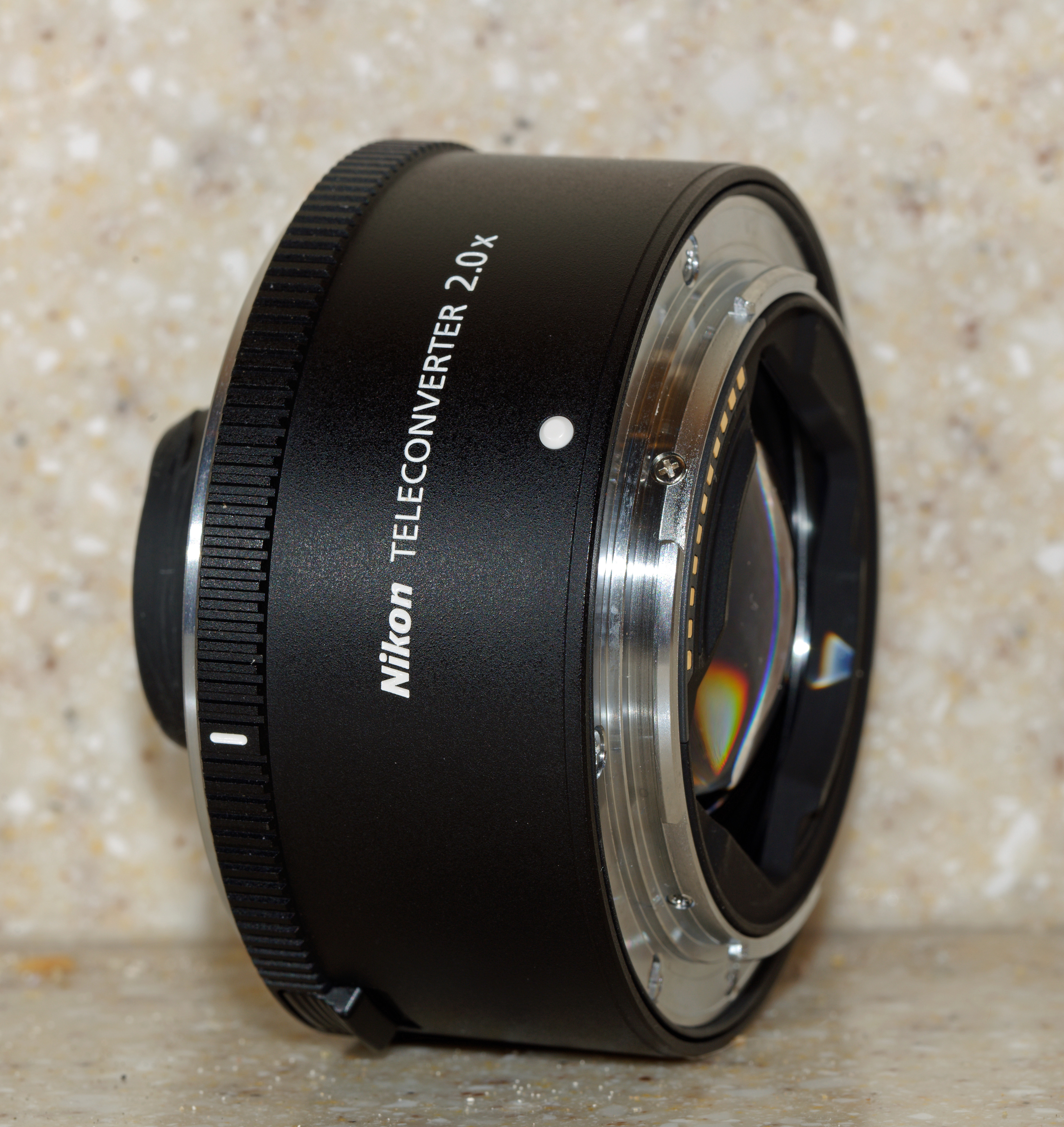
TC-2.0x teleconverter

The Nikon Z-mount teleconverters are a group of full-frame, secondary magnifying lenses mounted between the Z-mount lens and camera bodies to increase the focal length. It is attached to the Z-mount end of the lens before attaching the teleconverter's Z-mount to the powered-off camera. The following Nikon teleconverters are available:

Nikon Z-mount teleconverters
Name	E/G	Diam. × Len.	Weight	Change in speed	Rel date	Ref
Nikon Z TC-1.4x	6/4	72×18.5 mm (2.8×0.7 in)	220 g (7.8 oz)	Reduced by 1 stop	2020-08-28	
Nikon Z TC-2.0x	8/5	72×32.5 mm (2.8×1.3 in)	270 g (9.5 oz)	Reduced by 2 stops	2020-08-28	

The Nikon Z-mount teleconverters are only compatible with the following Nikon Z lenses, as the design of the lens must be able to physically accept the attachment of the Z teleconverter: There is a large protruding portion on the side of the teleconverter that attaches to the lens; many lenses don't have a recess which will accept this.

Zoom

- Nikkor Z 70–180 mm f/2.8
- Nikkor Z 70–200 mm f/2.8 VR S
- Nikkor Z 70–200 mm f/2.8 VR S II
- Nikkor Z 100–400 mm f/4.5–5.6 VR S
- Nikkor Z 120–300 mm f/2.8 TC VR S
- Nikkor Z 180–600 mm f/5.6–6.3 VR

Prime

- Nikkor Z 400 mm f/2.8 TC VR S
- Nikkor Z 400 mm f/4.5 VR S
- Nikkor Z 600 mm f/4 TC VR S
- Nikkor Z 600 mm f/6.3 VR S
- Nikkor Z 800 mm f/6.3 VR S

Although the Z-mount teleconverters are full-frame, they can be used on a Z-mount DX camera with any of the preceding lenses, as all Z-mount lenses are usable on all Z-mount cameras.

When a teleconverter is used, there is no change to the following lens characteristics: lens speed, AF functionality and speed, VR, and minimum focusing distance.

Z-mount teleconverters cannot be mounted on top of each other, although they can be used on lenses that have built-in teleconverters (included in the preceding list with the letters "TC"), further extending their reach.

Relating to the use of teleconverters with an FTZ II (or FTZ) mount adapter:

- Nikon Z-mount teleconverters cannot be used in conjunction with the FTZ adapter.
- Nikon F-mount teleconverters can be used on compatible F-mount lenses when used with the FTZ adapter.

=== Lens gallery ===
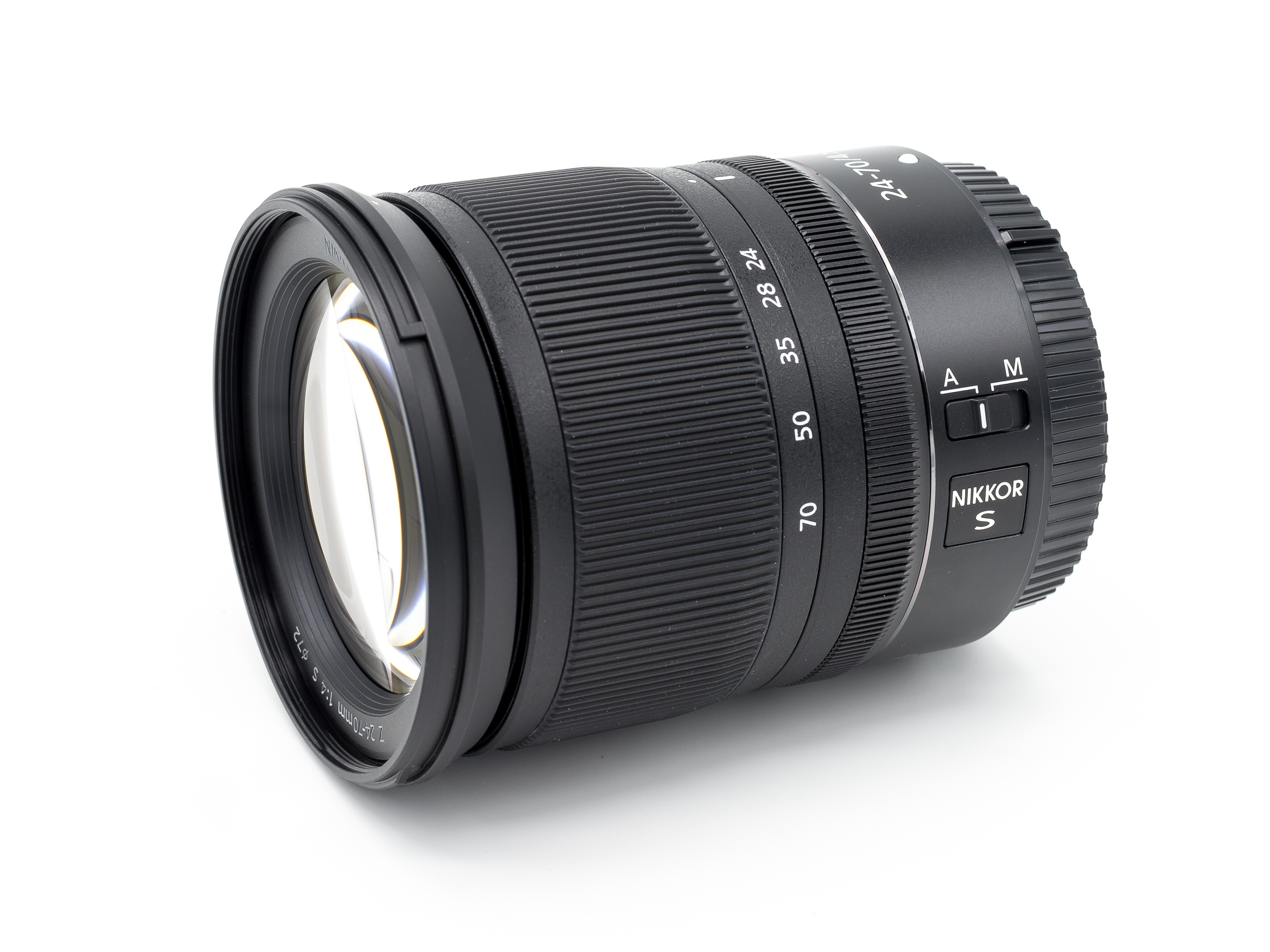
Nikkor Z 24-70 f/4 S

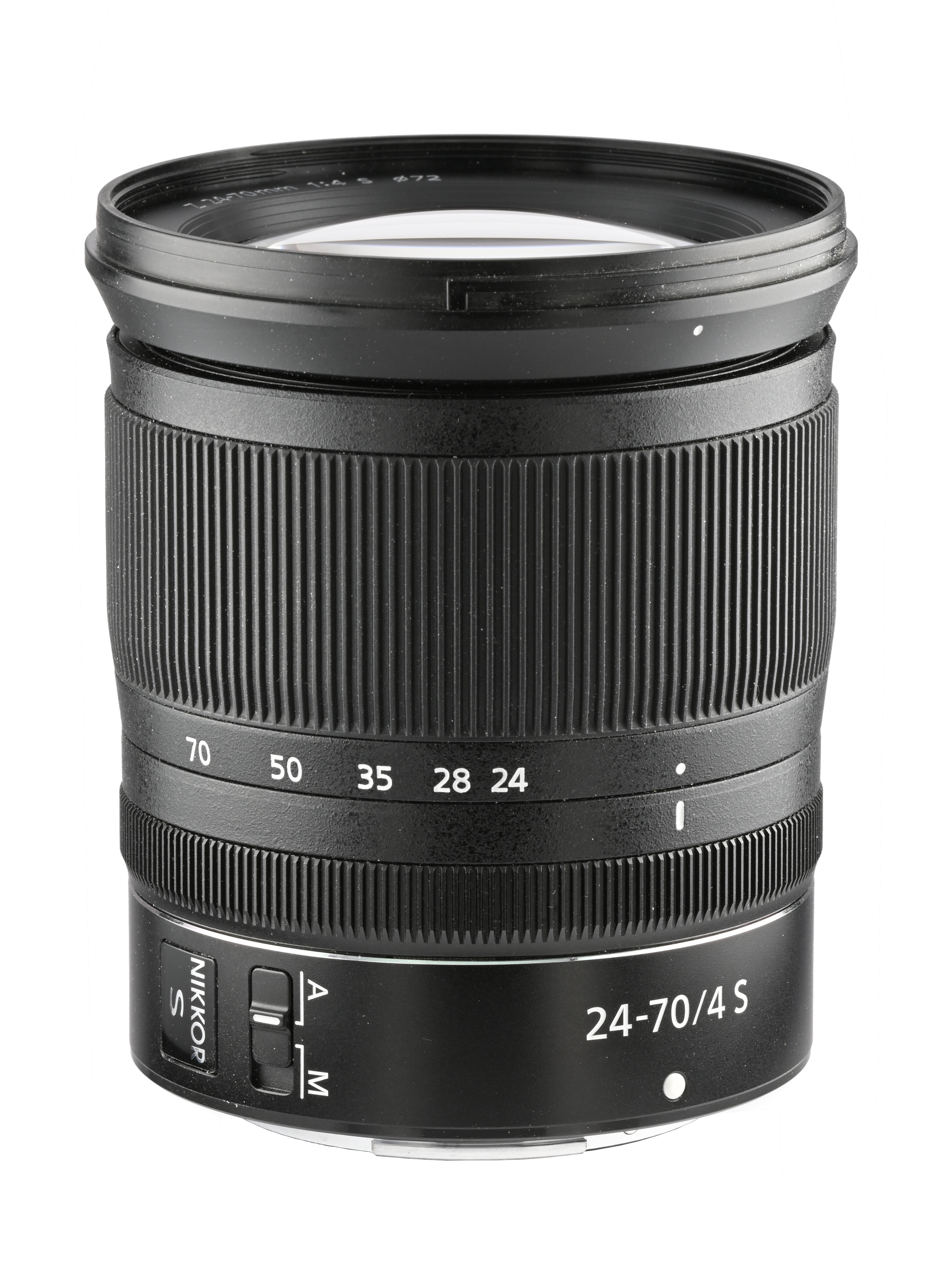
Nikkor Z 24-70 f/4 S

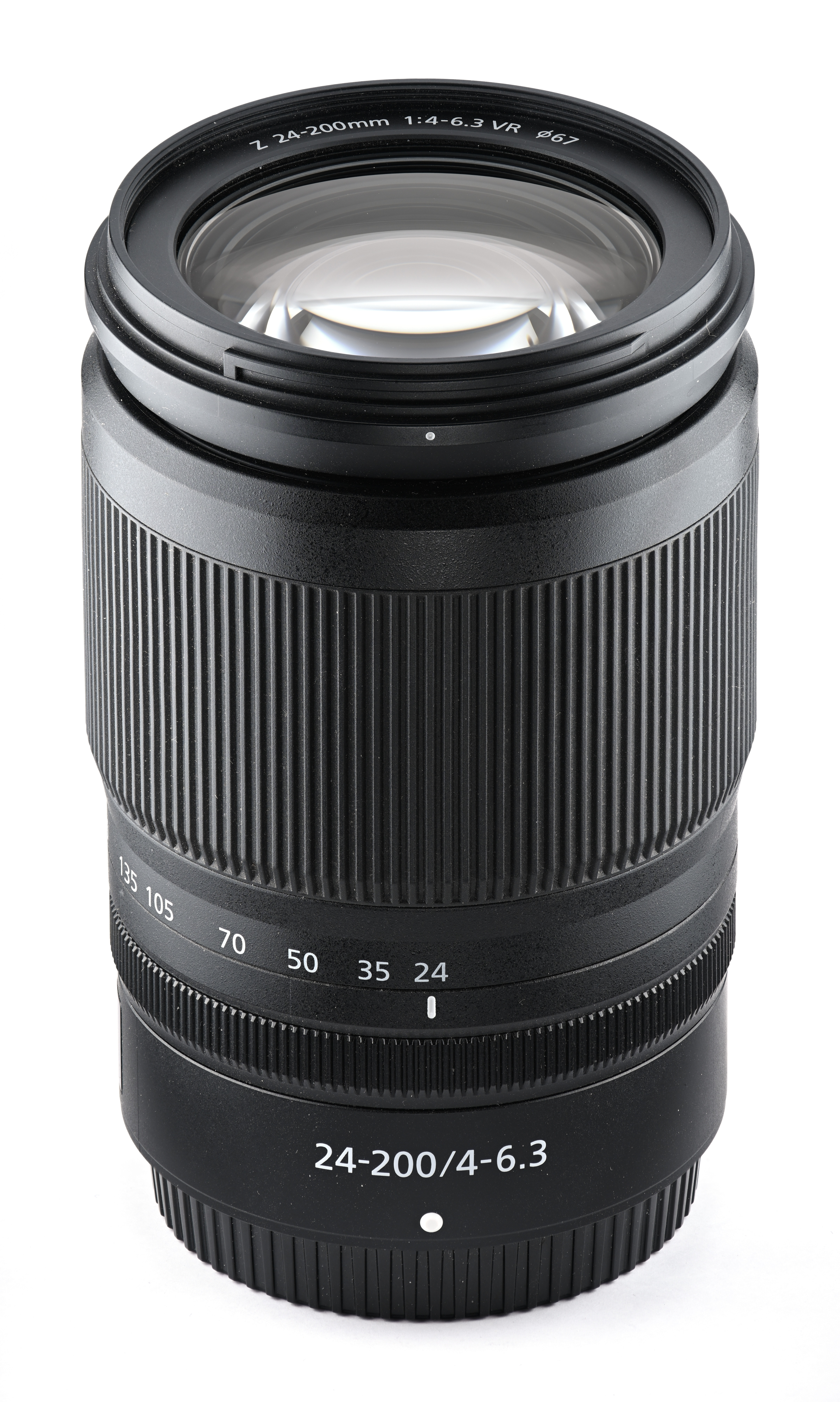
Nikkor Z 24-200 f/4–6.3 VR

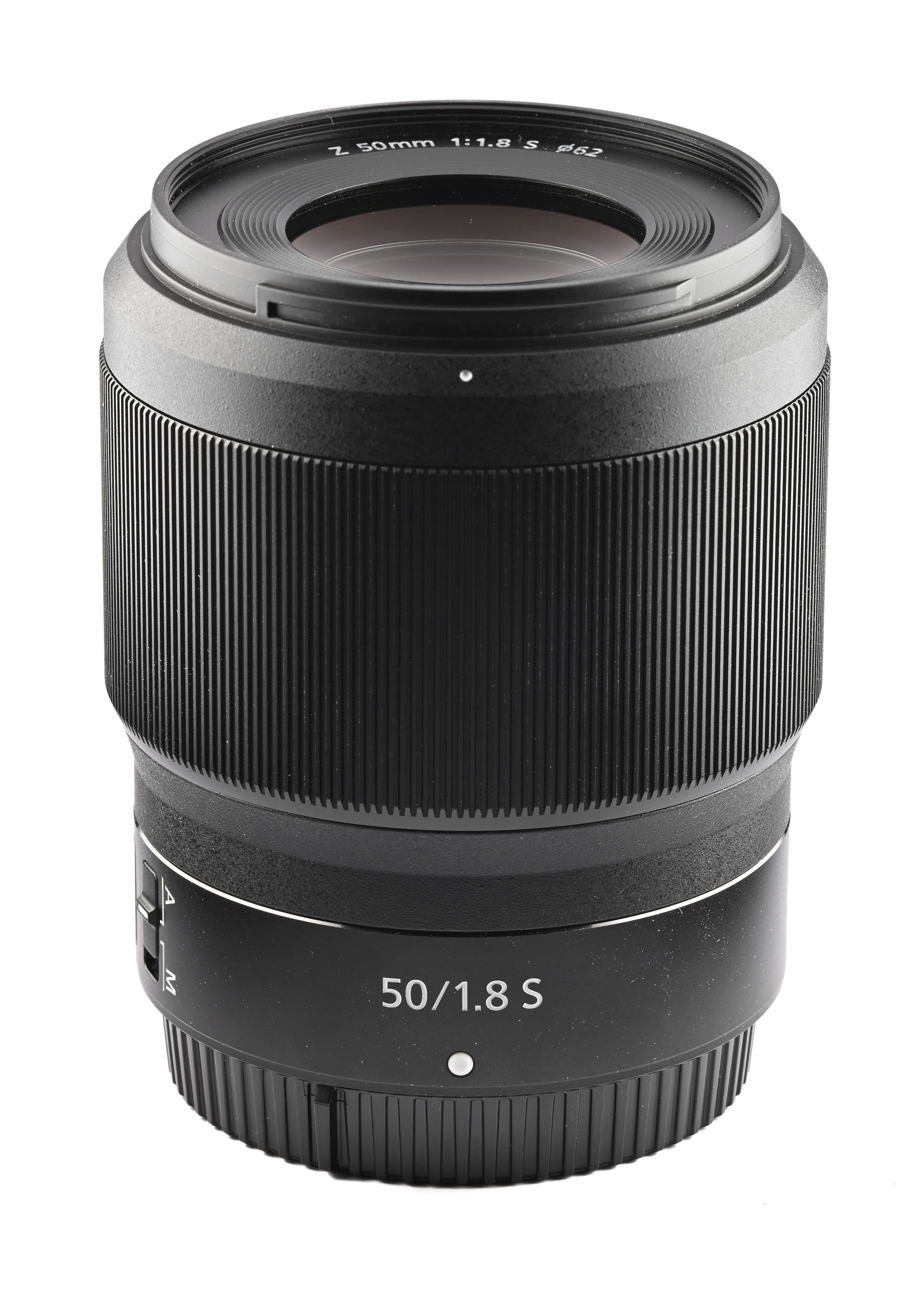
Nikkor Z 50 f/1.8 S

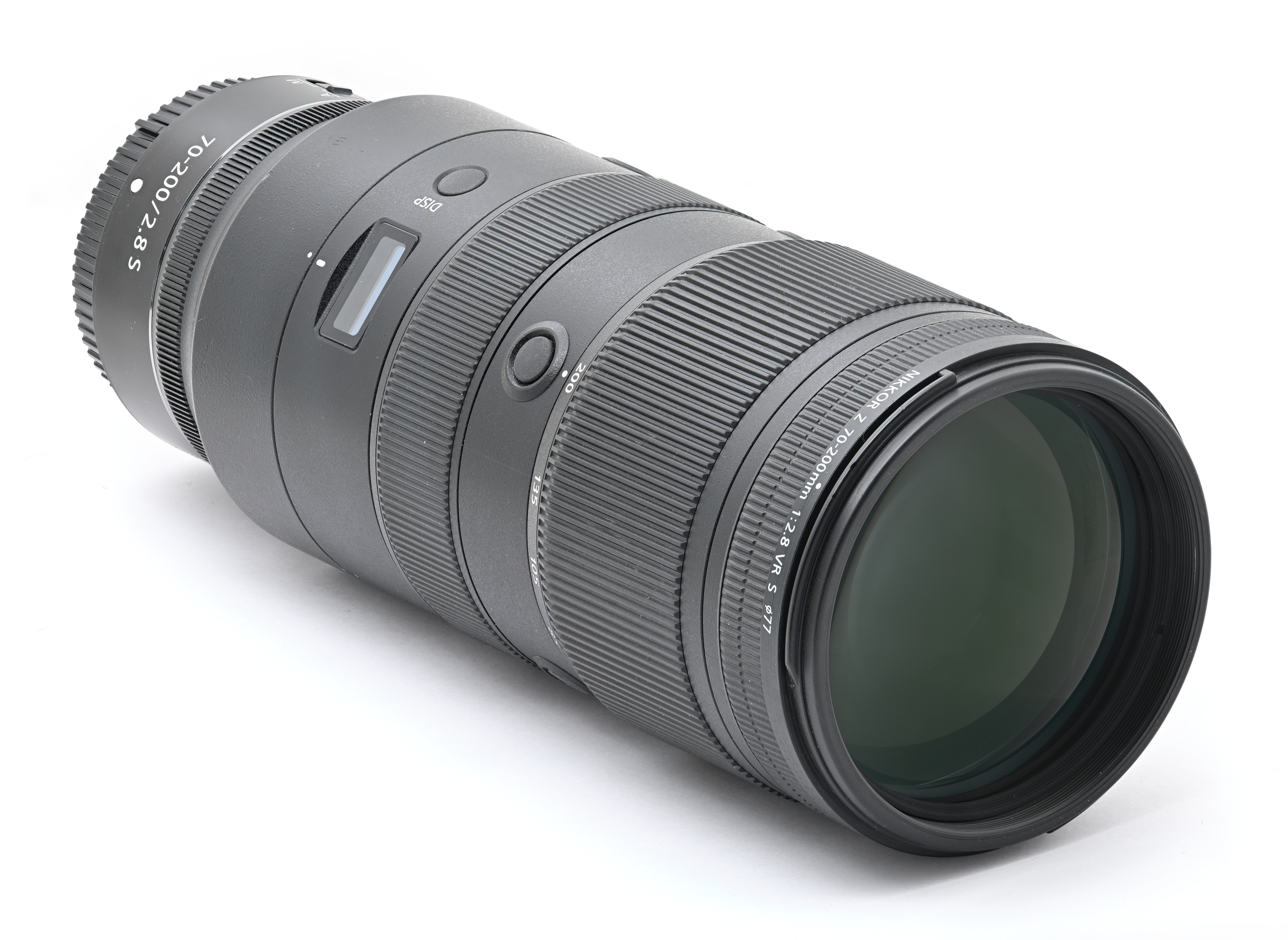
Nikkor Z 70-200 f/2.8 VR S

== Nikon Z-mount adapters ==
Nikon has two types of Z-mount adapters:

- For all Z-mount cameras, there are Nikon Z-mount adapters that allow F-mount lenses to be used. This includes RED cinema cameras with a Z-mount.
- For all RED Z-mount cameras, there are Nikon Z-mount adapters that allow PL-mount lenses to be used.

=== Nikon Z-mount adapters for all Z-mount cameras ===
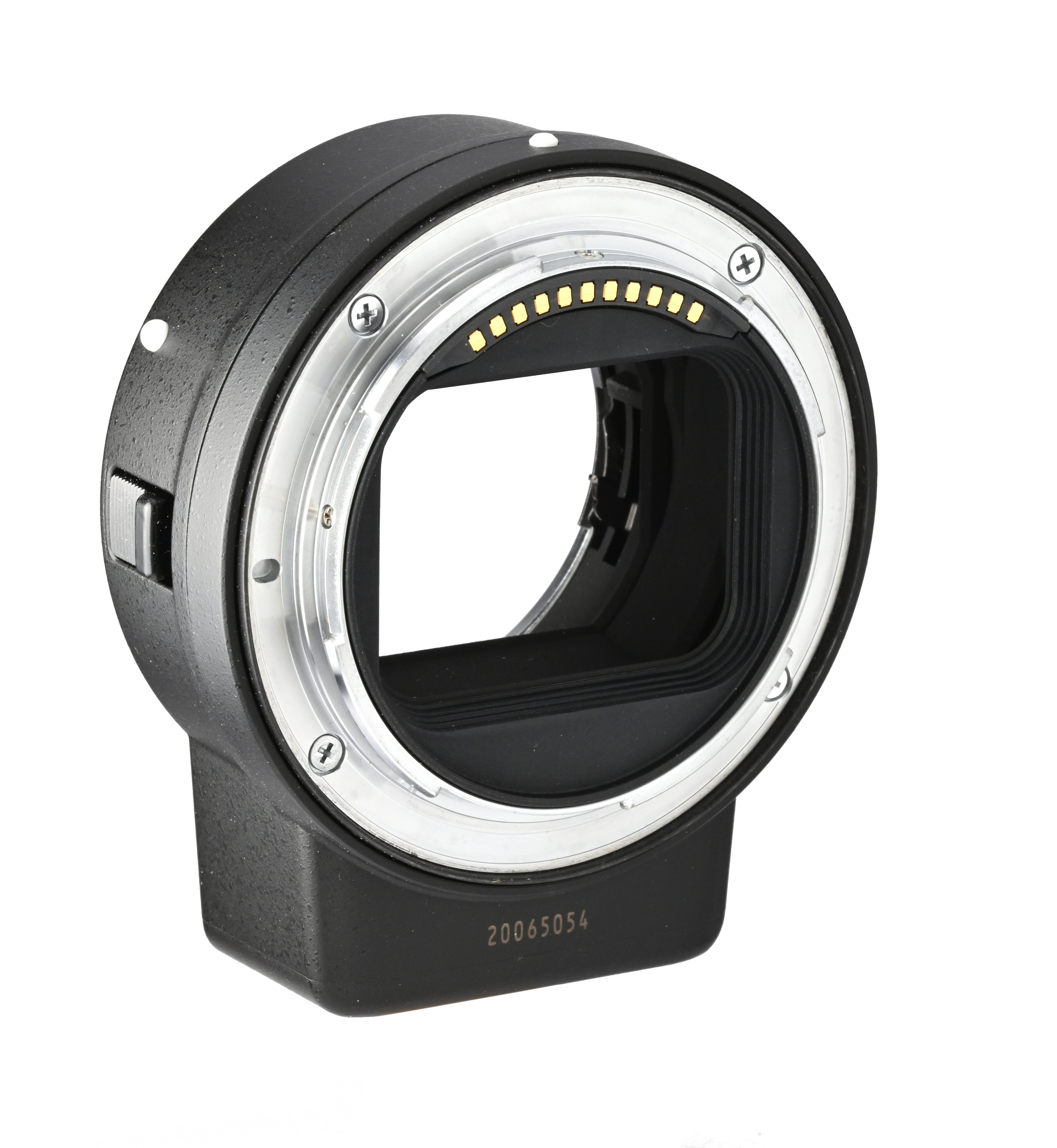
FTZ: Nikon F to Z-mount adapter, first generation

Nikon makes two lens adapters, the FTZ II and the original FTZ (discontinued in late 2021) which allow many Nikon F-mount lenses to be used on Z-mount cameras, including the RED Z-mount cameras. Nikon SLR cameras, both film and digital, have used the Nikon F-mount with its 44 mm throat diameter and 46.5 mm flange since 1959, while the Z-mount has a 55 mm throat diameter and a 16 mm flange distance. The FTZ allows AF-S, AF-P and AF-I lenses to autofocus on Z-mount cameras. The older screw-drive AF and AF-D lenses will not autofocus with the FTZ adapter (although some third-party adapters do support autofocus with screw-drive AF lenses), but they do retain metering and Exif data. All Z-mount cameras support metering with manual focus lenses, along with all full-frame Z-mount cameras also providing in-body image stabilization (IBIS) on them.

Mount adapters made by Nikon to support F-mount lenses on their Z-mount cameras are:

- Nikon FTZ: The FTZ supports F-mount lenses on Z-mount cameras, and provides an integrated tripod foot. Metering, IBIS and Exif metadata are supported with any F-mount lens, including manual lenses, while autofocus is only supported with AF-I, AF-S and AF-P lenses. Variable autofocus speed for video shooting is only supported with AF-P and select AF-S lenses. The FTZ adds 30.5 mm to the length of the attached lens, which is the difference in flange distance between the Nikon F-mount (46.5 mm) and the Z-mount (16 mm), along with allowing the F's smaller throat diameter to be mated to the larger Z diameter. This model was announced along with the Z6 and Z7 in September 2018, and was discontinued by Nikon in October 2021, after the introduction of the FTZ II.
- Nikon FTZ II: Same performance as the FTZ, but without the integrated tripod foot. This model was introduced in October 2021 along with the Z9, and allows for easier vertical shooting with the Z9.

As the FTZ adapter is a short, hollow tube with no lenses in its construction, there is no reduction in light passing through it, meaning no change in speed (unlike a teleconverter).

An FTZ adapter is attached to and released from a powered-off camera in the same manner as a lens. Once it is attached, the F-mount lens can then be attached to the adapter. Note that the FTZ has a lens release button for releasing an attached lens, similar to that on a camera body.

==== F-mount lens compatibility ====
Through the use of the FTZ, Nikon specifies F-mount lens compatibility as in the following table. Nikon F-mount teleconverters can be used on compatible F-mount lenses, but the Z-mount teleconverters may not be used in conjunction with the FTZ. For details on the lens types listed in the table, refer to Nikon F-mount. The VR on F-mount lenses with VR works when used with an FTZ.

Lens type		Focus	Exposure mode	Metering mode	Lens VR	IBIS	Exif data
Autofocus	AF-P; AF-S; AF-I	Autofocus	All modes (shutter-priority, aperture-priority, manual, and program modes)	All modes (matrix, center-weighted, spot, and highlight-weighted metering)	When VR is part of a specific lens.	Yes	Yes
Autofocus	G- and D-type (without motor)	Manual focus (with focus confirmation)	All modes (shutter-priority, aperture-priority, manual, and program modes)	All modes (matrix, center-weighted, spot, and highlight-weighted metering)	When VR is part of a specific lens.	Yes	Yes
Autofocus	Other AF (screw drive)	Manual focus (with focus peaking and electronic rangefinder confirmation)	All modes (shutter-priority, aperture-priority, manual, and program modes)	All modes (matrix, center-weighted, spot, and highlight-weighted metering)	When VR is part of a specific lens.	Yes	Yes
Manual focus	AI-P; PC-E	Manual focus (with focus peaking and electronic rangefinder confirmation)	All modes (shutter-priority, aperture-priority, manual, and program modes)	All modes (matrix, center-weighted, spot, and highlight-weighted metering)	VR not present on these lens types.	Yes	Yes
Manual focus	AI; PC (no CPU contacts)	Manual focus (with focus peaking and electronic rangefinder confirmation)	Aperture-priority and manual	All modes, except highlight-weighted metering	VR not present on these lens types.	Focal length and maximum aperture need to be entered manually	
Manual focus	Pre-AI	Not officially supported.					

=== Nikon Z-mount adapters for RED Z-mount cameras ===
Mount adapters provided by Nikon to support PL-mount lenses on their RED Z-mount cameras are the following:

- RED Z to PL Adapter Pack: Enables the use of PL-mount lenses on Z-mount RED Digital Cinema cameras.
  There is no change in optical speed (T-stop or light transmission) when using this adapter, as it has no glass elements.
- RED Z to PL with Electronic ND Adapter Pack: Similar to the previous, but includes an integrated electronic ND feature which allows a user to rapidly adjust exposure in 1/4, 1/3, or full stops.
  When the clear glass filter is installed in the adapter, there is no light loss or change in speed. When using the built-in ND filter cartridge, there is a reduction in exposure (in a 2-7 stop range, depanding on the setting).

Note that the two RED Z camera adapters cannot be used with Nikon Z mirrorless cameras, including the ZR.

Regarding PL lens, the RED Support page says the while "the vast majority of PL lenses are compatible with the PL Adapters w/ Electronic ND Filter, a small selection of PL lenses are not compatible due to their rear protrusion depth."

== Third-party lenses and adapters ==
Three companies license the Z-mount from Nikon, enabling full compatibility and respecting intellectual property: Cosina Voigtländer, Sigma, and Tamron.

Numerous manufacturers offer purely manual lenses and lens mount adapters for the Z-mount, which do not interface electronically to the camera and do not support autofocus or automatic control of the aperture. Some manufacturers offer lenses and adapters with full electronic functionality (autofocus, automatic aperture control, Exif metadata, etc.). Other than the three companies listed previously, third-party lenses and adapters often rely on reverse engineering the electronic protocol of a lens mount and might not work properly on new cameras or new camera firmware versions.

=== Autofocus lenses ===
All of the third-party autofocus Z-mount lenses are shown in the Table of Z-mount lenses.

Note that collecting specifications for all third-party manual focus lenses isn't feasible due to the large number of brands producing a great variety of such lenses. However, some special-use manual focus lenses (perspective control and fisheye) are contained in the tables in the Other non-AF lenses section.

=== Third-party teleconverters ===
There is a third-party teleconverter from Viltrox made for the Nikon Z-mount:

- Viltrox Teleconverter TC-2.0X Z — a 2.0× teleconverter

It is compatible with the following Nikkor lenses:

Zoom

- Nikkor Z 70–200 mm f/2.8 VR S
- Nikkor Z 100–400 mm f/4.5–5.6 VR S

Prime

- Nikkor Z 400 mm f/4.5 VR S

=== Mount adapters ===
As described earlier, the short Z-mount flange distance coupled with the large throat diameter allows for numerous lenses of nearly all other current and previous mounts to be used with an appropriate lens mount adapter on a Z-mount camera.

- For ARRI PL-mount lenses
  - The Wooden Camera Nikon Z Mount to PL Mount Adapter (Pro) can mount a PL lens.
  - The KipperTie Adapta v2 Z/PL converts from a Z-mount to industry-standard PL.
  - The Peipro PL-Z Lens Adapter lets you attach ARRI PL-mount cinema lenses onto Nikon Z-mount cameras.
  - The Viltrox PL-Z Lens Mount Adapter is designed to enable PL mount lenses to be used with Nikon Z-mount cameras.
- For Canon EF lenses
  - The Fringer EF-NZ adapter provides full electronic integration (autofocus, image stabilization, aperture control).
  - The Fringer EF-NZ II revision removes the tripod foot for better handling with vertical grips (much like Nikon's FTZ II did) and adds weather-sealing.
  - The Techart TZC-01 also provides full electronic integration.
  - The Viltrox EF-Z adapter appears identical to the Fringer EF-NZ.
  - The Viltrox EF-Z2 has a built-in 0.7x focal reducer ("speed booster").
  - The Megadap EFTZ21 provides full electronic integration and autofocus, with an extra configurable control ring and a lens function button (L-Fn).
- For Canon FD/FL lenses
  - The Fotodiox Pro FD-NKZ-P is an all-metal lens mount adapter that allows you to attach vintage Canon FD and FL 35mm SLR lenses.
  - The K&F Concept FD-NIK Z (KF06.366) lets you mount Canon FD and FL film lenses onto Z-mount cameras.
  - The Metabones Canon FD Lens to Nikon Z-mount T Adapter is a mechanical lens mount adapter that lets you mount Canon FD and FL lenses onto Z-mount cameras.
- For Contax G lenses
  - The Techart TZG-01 adapts Contax G lenses with mechanical autofocus to Nikon Z. The Contax G system is somewhat similar to the older screw-drive Nikon AF system, but unlike the Nikon system, Contax G lenses do not have a manual focus ring. This makes Contax G unusually difficult to adapt to mirrorless cameras. It is not compatible with the Nikon Z9 and Z8.
  - The Shoten GTZ, similarly to the Techart TZG-01, adapts Contax G lenses with mechanical autofocus. It also has a micro-USB port on the bottom for firmware upgrades.
- For Fujifilm G/GF/GFX lenses
  - The Boryoza GF to Nikon Z Autofocus Adapter lets you mount medium-format Fujifilm GFX lenses onto Nikon Z-mount mirrorless cameras with electronic communication and autofocus support.
  - The SHOTEN GXTZ is an electronic mount adapter that allows Fujifilm GFX medium-format GF-mount lenses to be mounted and used on Z-mount cameras.
- For Fujifilm X mount lenses
  - The Boryoza XF-Z adapts Fujinon XF lenses with autofocus to Nikon Z.
- For Leica M mount lenses
  - The Fotodiox LM-NKZ-PRN is an autofocus Leica M to Z adapter.
  - The Megadap MTZ11 contains a focusing helicoid with 6.5 mm of extension which is used for autofocus. This range is sufficient to cover the full focusing range of lenses up to around 50 mm focal length.
  - The Techart TZM-01 is similar to the Megadap MTZ11 and enables autofocus with M-mount lenses.
  - The Techart TZM-02 is a refined version of the TZM-01 with better autofocus performance.
  - The TTArtisan M-Z 6-Bit adapter doesn't provide autofocus, but has a reader for Leica's 6-bit lens codes. This makes 6-bit coded lenses behave like Ai-P lenses on the FTZ, except with no aperture control (as rangefinder lenses use pre-set apertures): EXIF data is automatically recorded, IBIS is set to the correct focal length and focus confirmation is supported.
- For Leica R mount lenses
  - The FotodioX Leica R Lens to Nikon Z-Mount Camera Pro Lens Adapter allows Leica R bayonet mount lenses to operate on a Nikon Z. It is a fully manual design.
- For M39/LTM lenses
  - The Novoflex Leica M39 Lens to Nikon Z-Mount Camera Adapter mechanical adapter that lets you mount Leica 39mm thread-mount (LTM / L39) rangefinder lenses onto Nikon Z-mount cameras.
  - The Urth M39 to Nikon Z Lens Mount Adapter is a manual mechanical adapter that lets you mount M39 screw-mount lenses onto Z-series cameras.
- For M42 lenses
  - The Pholsy M42-N/Z allows you to mount M42 42mm screw-mount lenses onto Z-mount cameras.
- For Micro Four Thirds lenses
  - The Pixco Manual Lens Adapter is a mechanical pass-through adapter which allows Micro Four Thirds lenses to be used on a Z-camera.
- For Nikon F-mount lenses
  - Nikon produces OEM adapters (see Nikon OEM adapters).
  - The Viltrox NF-Z is largely identical to Nikon's original FTZ adapter, both in function and form. Like the FTZ, autofocus does not function with screw-drive AF/AF-D lenses. It has a USB-C port for firmware updates.
  - The MonsterAdapter LA-FZ1 is the first adapter that allows F-mount screw-driven AF and AF-D lenses to be used on Z cameras with full autofocus. It was showcased at CP+ 2025. Per their website, it "does NOT include autofocus support for AF-I, AF-S, and AF-P lenses, nor support of EMD electromagnetic aperture and lens VR."
- For Nikon 1-mount lenses
  - There are no adapters, due in equal parts to the minimal flange difference (17mm on the 1-mount vs. 16mm on the Z-mount), vignetting from the small imaging circle (1-series was designed for the small CX format), and the short life that the lenses were manufactured (less than 7 years).
- For Nikon IX-mount lenses
  - There are no commercially available adapters, as the IX lenses feature a protruding rear element and shroud, along with lacking a traditional mechanical aperture ring. However, as the IX-Nikkor lenses use the same electronic communications as Nikkor AF F-mount lenses with distance encoding (AF-D), they may be adapted, at a potential risk, to Z-mount cameras in DX (cropped sensor) mode.
- For Nikon S-mount lenses - Outer bayonet
  - The Roxsen Nikon S mount rangefinder lens to Nikon Z mount mirrorless adapter can be used to mount outer bayonet rangefinder lenses. As these are manual lenses with a short flange distance, they use manual focus and manual exposure control.
- For Nikon S-mount lenses - Inner bayonet
  - No adapters exist.
- For Pentax K/DA lenses
  - The K&F Concept Pentax K/DA Lens to Nikon Z Manual Focus Adapter lets you mount Pentax K-mount and DA-series DSLR lenses onto Z-cameras.
  - The Fotodiox Pro Lens Mount Adapter (PKAF-NKZ-P) lets you mount Pentax K-mount (PK and PK/AF) lenses onto Nikon Z-mount mirrorless cameras.
  - The Urth ULMA-K-Z is a manual lens mount adapter allowing Pentax K-mount lenses to be attached to Z-mount cameras.
- For Samsung NX lenses
  - There are no commercial, mass-produced lens adapters available .
- For Sony E-mount lenses
  - The Fotodiox Pro Fusion SNE-NKZ adapts lenses with autofocus and image stabilization, as well as lens function button support.
  - The Megadap ETZ11 is similar to the Techart TZE-01/02 and adapts lenses with autofocus and image stabilization support. In contrast to the Techart adapter, the ETZ11 can be mounted on the Z50 and Zfc.
  - The Megadap ETZ21 and ETZ21 Pro are improved versions of the ETZ11, and provide full function E-mount support, including autofocus, image stabilization, full-time manual focus, and support for programmable lens buttons and aperture rings.
  - The Megadap ETZ21 Pro+ has weather sealing, improved mechanical structure. It is compatible with the Sony LA-EA5 A-to-E mount adapter, therefore it also supports Sony A-mount lenses through stacking the LA-EA5 on the ETZ21 Pro+. It is also compatible with RED Z-mount cameras.
  - The Meike Mount Adapter ETZ is compatible with a wide range of Sony, Tamron, Sigma and Meike lenses with Sony E-mount, and supports autofocus, aperture control, EXIF and image stabilization.
  - The Techart TZE-01/TZE-02 allows mounting Sony E-mount lenses on Z-mount cameras with full electronic integration. This adapter cannot be mounted on the Z50 or the Zfc.
  - The Viltrox E-Z AF Lens Mount Adapter adapts E-mount lenses with autofocus and full electronic integration. Also supports adapter firmware upgrades.
- For Sony A-mount lenses
  - Stack the Sony LA-EA5 adapter on the Megadap ETZ21 Pro+ adapter, to adapt selected lenses (from A to E, then E to Z mount).

== Z-mount accessories ==
=== Accessory port ===
The Z9 and Z8 have the same circular 10-pin accessory port (for a remote shutter release, external GPS receiver, etc.) as previous "pro-grade" Nikon DSLRs (such as the D3/D4/D5/D6 series).

The Z6/Z7 (and their successors) and the Z5 have the rectangular 8-pin accessory port introduced with the D90 and used on most other Nikon DSLRs since.

The Z30/Z50/Zfc/Zf (and their successors) and the Z5II/Z5IIC do not have an accessory port.

The ZR does not have the same type of accessory port, but rather, it has a 26-pin digital hot shoe for two-way communication. This allows the camera to supply power and send data to and receive data from attached compatible microphones and tally lamps.

=== Flashes ===
All Nikon Z cameras (other than the ZR, which has a digital accessory shoe) have a hot shoe, which allows the use of the same iTTL flash system (Nikon CLS) as Nikon DSLRs, which remains fully backward compatible and with third-party flashes and flash transmitters.

Third-party flashes can be used on Z-mount cameras, as long as they have the same basic hot shoe design; standards define the two pins required to trigger the flash. However, they won't be integrated into the Z-system camera menus, and need to have the power adjusted manually and have the user be mindful of the maximum sync speed limits of the camera.

Although not a separate accessory, the Z50II and Z50 have built-in flashes, in addition to the hot shoe.

=== Batteries ===
Nikon Z cameras can be powered by both a custom battery and, except for the original Z50, directly via a USB-C cable.

The battery in the camera powers every electronic component required to operate the camera, including the image sensor and processor, autofocus system, EVF and LCD, IBIS, Wi-Fi and Bluetooth, media reading and writing, and built-in flash. It additionally powers the electronic components of lenses, including autofocus motors, electronic aperture control, image stabilization, power zoom, and communication with the camera.

Each camera uses one of the three proprietary lithium-ion batteries. The battery is rechargeable in-camera via USB-C PD (USB Power Delivery) (except for the original Z50), along with being rechargeable outside the camera using an external Nikon charger; refer to the following table for specific charger models.

Each of the battery types has multiple variants, as they improve on the designs over the years, increasing the capacity and adding the USB-C charging where the original variants did not support it. Most Z cameras use the same batteries of their "peer" DSLRs:

- EN-EL18/a/b/c/d batteries are used on the Nikon Z9. It was introduced with the D4.
  In-camera charging using USB-C is available from the EN-EL18b onwards (introduced in 2017).
- EN-EL15/a/b/c batteries are used in the Nikon Z5/Z6/Z7 (and their successors), Z8, Zf, and ZR. It was introduced with the D7000.
  The Z5II, Z5IIC, Z6III, Z8, Zf, and ZR do not officially support the original EN-EL15 battery, only the subsequent a/b/c versions (although the "Li-ion20" variant of the EN-EL15 does work in practice).
  In-camera charging using USB-C is supported for all of these cameras from the EN-EL15b onwards (introduced in 2018).
- EN-EL25/a is a new battery type, used on the Nikon Z50, Z50II, Z30, and Zfc. It was introduced with the Z50. Previous entry-level DSLRs like the D5600 or D3500 used the EN-EL14.
  In-camera charging using USB-C is supported for all of these cameras, except for the original Z50.

Battery compatibility matrix for Nikon Z cameras
Battery				Camera																Charging		Rel date	Ref
Type		V	mAh	Z9	Z8	Zf	Z7II	Z7	ZR	Z6III	Z6II	Z6	Z5II	Z5IIC	Z5	Zfc	Z50II	Z50	Z30	USB-C	External	Rel date	Ref
EN-EL18	d	10.8	3300	Yes	No (Note: Uses EN-EL15 battery.)											No (Note: Uses EN-EL25 battery.)				Yes	MH‑33	2021–12	
EN-EL18	c	10.8	2500	Yes	No											No				Yes	MH‑26, MH‑26a, MH‑33	2018–07	
EN-EL18	b	10.8	2500	Yes	No											No				Yes	MH‑26, MH‑26a, MH‑33	2017–03	
EN-EL18	a	10.8	2500	Yes (Note: The battery cannot be charged through USB-C.)	No											No				No	MH‑26, MH‑26a	2014–03	
EN-EL18		10.8	2000	Yes	No											No				No	MH‑26, MH‑26a	2012–03	
EN-EL15	c	7.0	2280	No (Note: Uses EN-EL18 battery.)	Yes											No				Yes	MH‑25a, MH‑34	2020–07	
EN-EL15	b	7.0	1900	No	Yes											No				Yes	MH‑25, MH‑25a, MH‑34	2018–11	
EN-EL15	a	7.0	1900	No	Yes											No				No	MH‑25, MH‑25a	2015	
EN-EL15		7.0	1900	No	No	No	Yes	Yes	No	No	Yes	Yes	No	No	Yes	No				No	MH‑25, MH‑25a	2010–09	
EN-EL25	a	7.6	1250	No	No											Yes (Note: EN-EL25a only supported with Zfc FW 1.50 and above.)	Yes	Yes (Note: EN-EL25a only supported with Z50 FW 2.50 and above.) (Note: The Z50 does not have USB-C charging.)	Yes (Note: EN-EL25a only supported with Z30 FW 1.10 and above.)	Yes	MH‑32	2023–12	
EN-EL25		7.6	1120	No	No											Yes	Yes	Yes	Yes	Yes	MH‑32	2019–10	

=== Battery and remote control grips ===
Battery grips are available for several models:

- The MB-N10 is compatible with the Nikon Z5, Z6, Z6II, Z7, and Z7II, but is purely a battery grip with no vertical camera controls.
- The MB-N11 is compatible with the Nikon Z6II, Z7II, and Z5II, and adds vertical camera controls.
- The MB-N12 is compatible with the Nikon Z8 and also has vertical camera controls.
- The MB-N14 is compatible with the Nikon Z6III, Z5II, Z6II, and Z7II, and it also has vertical camera controls. It was initially released with the Z6III.

Nikon does not offer vertical battery grips for the Z50II, Z50, Z30, Zfc, Zf, ZR, and Z5IIC; they all lack electrical connectors in the battery compartment. The Nikon Z9 has a built-in vertical battery grip that is integrated into its body, and thus doesn't need an add-on grip.

The MC-N10 is a remote-control grip for all Z cameras with USB-C (the first-generation Z50 is the sole camera to not use USB-C). It connects through a USB-C cable to the camera and replicates the right-hand controls of the camera body. It is designed for video applications and uses an ARRI rosette-type mount. Cameras introduced before its release require a firmware update to use it.

Grip compatibility matrix for Nikon Z cameras
Grip		Camera																Connection to camera	Batteries	Camera controls	Wt.	Rel date	Ref
Name	Type	Z9	Z8	Zf	Z7II	Z7	ZR	Z6III	Z6II	Z6	Z5II	Z5IIC	Z5	Zfc	Z50II	Z50	Z30	Connection to camera	Batteries	Camera controls	Wt.	Rel date	Ref
MB-N14	vertical battery grip	Grip built-in	No	No	Yes	No	No	Yes	Yes	No	Yes	No (Note: Lacks electrical connectors in the battery compartment, and thus cannot support battery grips.)	No	No				Internal; portion inserted into camera battery slot	2× EN-EL15a/b/c	Yes (Note: MB-N11/12/14 provide additional battery power, along with camera controls)	295 g	2024-06-12	
MB-N12	vertical battery grip	Grip built-in	Yes	No	No	No	No	No	No	No	No	No	No	No				Internal; portion inserted into camera battery slot	2× EN-EL15a/b/c	Yes	295 g	2023-05-10	
MB-N11	vertical battery grip	Grip built-in	No	No	Yes	No	No	No	Yes	No	Yes	No	No	No				Internal; portion inserted into camera battery slot	2× EN-EL15a/b/c	Yes	290 g	2020-10-04	
MB-N10	vertical battery grip	Grip built-in	No	No	Yes	Yes	No	No	Yes	Yes	No	No	Yes	No				Internal; portion inserted into camera battery slot	2× EN-EL15a/b/c	No (Note: MB-N10 only provides additional battery power; it does not have camera controls)	300 g	2019-10-10	
MC-N10	tethered grip	Yes (Note: MC-N10 only supported with Z9 FW 3.00 and above)	Yes	Yes	Yes (Note: MC-N10 only supported with Z7II FW 1.50 and above)	Yes (Note: MC-N10 only supported with Z7 FW 3.60 and above)	Yes	Yes	Yes (Note: MC-N10 only supported with Z6II FW 1.50 and above)	Yes (Note: MC-N10 only supported with Z6 FW 3.60 and above)	Yes	Yes	Yes (Note: MC-N10 only supported with Z5 FW 1.40 and above)	Yes (Note: MC-N10 only supported with Zfc FW 1.40 and above)	Yes	No (Note: The Z50 does not have a USB-C port.)	Yes (Note: MC-N10 only supported with Z30 FW 1.10 and above)	USB-C	(Note: The MC-N10 can be powered by 2× 1.5V AA, or 2× 1.2V Ni-MH batteries, but these are only powering the grip. The USB-C connection only carries data communication, not power (in either direction).)	Yes	205 g	2022-11-02	

=== Wireless control ===
The ML-L7 Bluetooth Remote Control can be used to wirelessly control many of the functions on select Z cameras. Cameras supported are the Z30, Z50, Z50II, Zf, Zfc, ZR, Z5, Z5II, Z5IIC, Z6II, Z6III, and Z7II. It provides functions to press the shutter, movie record, power zoom, multi-selector, OK, and Fn1/Fn2.

The Nikon SnapBridge app can be used via a paired smart device to remotely control several functions of the camera, including viewing a live view, shot framing, adjusting exposure settings (such as shutter speed, aperture, ISO, and white balance), doing tap-to-focus, and firing the shutter.

=== Microphones ===
The ME-1 Stereo Microphone is available to allow the creation of higher-quality audio than the cameras' built-in stereo microphones. It mounts on the hot shoe, and connects to the camera via the 3.5mm stereo mini-plug.

The ME-D10 Shotgun Microphone attaches to the 26-pin digital hot shoe of the Nikon ZR. It supports 32-bit float audio recording and is powered by and connected to the camera solely through the hot shoe. It does not use the 3.5mm stereo mini-plug.

Third-party microphones can be used on Z-mount cameras, as long as they can mount on the hot shoe and have a 3.5mm stereo mini-plug.

=== Underwater cases ===
As noted on their webpage, "Nikon does not produce underwater cases/housings for ... Z series cameras, however they are available from third-party companies."

=== Other accessories ===
Nikon makes two different caps for the lenses and cameras:

- The LF-N1 is a rear lens cap. It protects the rear element of a Nikkor Z lens from dust, smudges, and scratches when the lens is detached from the camera body.
- The BF-N1 is a body cap. It protects a Z-camera's sensor when a lens is not attached.

== Table of Z-mount lenses ==
The following table contains the specifications for 183 Z-mount lenses, including all Nikon Z-mount lenses, as well as all autofocus third-party Z-mount lenses. Collecting specifications for all third-party lenses, including manual focus ones, isn't feasible due to the large number of brands producing a great variety of such lenses. Some special-use manual focus lenses (perspective control and fisheye) are in the tables in the following section.

Brand	Focal length	Aperture (Note: Aperture values are given as either: F-stop, starting with an f/ T-stop, starting with a T and having a black background)	FX/DX	Designations	VR	S-Line	L‑Fn	Zoom	Min Focus Dist	Mag.	Filter size	Diameter	Length	Weight	E/G	Rel date	Ref
Nikkor	12–28mm	f/3.5–5.6	DX	PZ VR	Yes	No		Internal power zoom	0.19 m (0.62 ft)	1:4.8	67 mm	72 mm (2.8 in)	63.5 mm (2.50 in)	205 g (7.2 oz)	12/11	2023-04-18	
Nikkor	14–24mm	f/2.8	FX	S	No	Yes	L‑Fn	Internal	0.28 m (0.92 ft)	1:7.6	112 mm	88.5 mm (3.48 in)	124.5 mm (4.90 in)	650 g (23 oz)	16/11	2020-09-16	
Nikkor	14–30mm	f/4	FX	S	No	Yes		External	0.28 m (0.92 ft)	1:6.2	82 mm	89 mm (3.5 in)	85 mm (3.3 in)	485 g (17.1 oz)	14/12	2019-01-08	
Nikkor	16–50mm	f/2.8	DX	VR	Yes	No		External	0.15–0.25 m (0.49–0.82 ft)	1:4.2	67 mm	74.5 mm (2.93 in)	88 mm (3.5 in)	330 g (12 oz)	12/11	2025-10-16	
Nikkor	16–50mm	f/3.5–6.3	DX	VR	Yes	No		External	0.2 m (0.66 ft)	1:5	46 mm	70 mm (2.8 in)	32 mm (1.3 in)	135 g (4.8 oz)	9/7	2019-10-10	
Nikkor	16–50mm	f/3.5–6.3	DX	VR SL	Yes	No		External	0.2 m (0.66 ft)	1:5	46 mm	70 mm (2.8 in)	32 mm (1.3 in)	135 g (4.8 oz)	9/7	2021-06-29	
Nikkor	17–28mm	f/2.8	FX		No	No		Internal	0.19 m (0.62 ft)	1:5.3	67 mm	75 mm (3.0 in)	101 mm (4.0 in)	450 g (16 oz)	13/11	2022-09-20	
Nikkor	18–140mm	f/3.5–6.3	DX	VR	Yes	No		External	0.2 m (0.66 ft)	1:3	62 mm	73 mm (2.9 in)	90 mm (3.5 in)	315 g (11.1 oz)	17/13	2021-10-13	
Nikkor	20mm	f/1.8	FX	S	No	Yes		Prime	0.2 m (0.66 ft)	1:5.3	77 mm	84.5 mm (3.33 in)	108.5 mm (4.27 in)	505 g (17.8 oz)	14/11	2020-02-11	
Nikkor	24mm	f/1.8	FX	S	No	Yes		Prime	0.25 m (0.82 ft)	1:6.6	72 mm	78 mm (3.1 in)	96.5 mm (3.80 in)	450 g (16 oz)	12/10	2019-09-04	
Nikkor	24mm	f/1.7	DX		No	No		Prime	0.18 m (0.59 ft)	1:5.3	46 mm	70 mm (2.8 in)	40 mm (1.6 in)	135 g (4.8 oz)	9/8	2023-05-31	
Nikkor	24–50mm	f/4–6.3	FX		No	No		External	0.35 m (1.1 ft)	1:5.8	52 mm	73.5 mm (2.89 in)	51 mm (2.0 in)	195 g (6.9 oz)	11/10	2020-07-21	
Nikkor	24–70mm	f/2.8	FX	S	No	Yes	L‑Fn	External	0.38 m (1.2 ft)	1:4.5	82 mm	89 mm (3.5 in)	126 mm (5.0 in)	805 g (28.4 oz)	17/15	2019-02-14	
Nikkor	24–70mm	f/2.8	FX	S II	No	Yes	L‑Fn ×2	Internal	0.24–0.33 m (0.79–1.08 ft)	1:3.1	77 mm	84 mm (3.3 in)	142 mm (5.6 in)	675 g (23.8 oz)	14/10	2025-08-22	
Nikkor	24–70mm	f/4	FX	S	No	Yes		External	0.3 m (0.98 ft)	1:3.3	72 mm	77.5 mm (3.05 in)	88.5 mm (3.48 in)	500 g (18 oz)	14/11	2018-08-23	
Nikkor	24–105mm	f/4–7.1	FX		No	No		External	0.2–0.28 m (0.66–0.92 ft)	1:2	67 mm	73.5 mm (2.89 in)	106.5 mm (4.19 in)	350 g (12 oz)	12/10	2026-01-07	
Nikkor	24–120mm	f/4	FX	S	No	Yes	L‑Fn	External	0.35 m (1.1 ft)	1:2.5	77 mm	84 mm (3.3 in)	118 mm (4.6 in)	630 g (22 oz)	16/13	2021-10-28	
Nikkor	24–200mm	f/4–6.3	FX	VR	Yes	No		External	0.5 m (1.6 ft)	1:3.5	67 mm	76.5 mm (3.01 in)	114 mm (4.5 in)	570 g (20 oz)	19/15	2020-02-11	
Nikkor	26mm	f/2.8	FX		No	No		Prime	0.2 m (0.66 ft)	1:5.3	52 mm	70 mm (2.8 in)	23.5 mm (0.93 in)	125 g (4.4 oz)	8/6	2023-02-07	
Nikkor	28mm	f/2.8	FX		No	No		Prime	0.19 m (0.62 ft)	1:5	52 mm	70 mm (2.8 in)	43 mm (1.7 in)	155 g (5.5 oz)	9/8	2021-11-18	
Nikkor	28mm	f/2.8	FX	SE	No	No		Prime	0.19 m (0.62 ft)	1:5	52 mm	71.5 mm (2.81 in)	43 mm (1.7 in)	160 g (5.6 oz)	9/8	2021-06-29	
Nikkor	28–75mm	f/2.8	FX		No	No		External	0.19 m (0.62 ft)	1:2.9	67 mm	75 mm (3.0 in)	120.5 mm (4.74 in)	565 g (19.9 oz)	15/12	2021-12-14	
Nikkor	28–135mm	f/4	FX	PZ	No	No	L‑Fn ×2	Internal power zoom	0.34–0.57 m (1.1–1.9 ft)	1:4	95 mm	105 mm (4.1 in)	177.5 mm (6.99 in)	1,210 g (43 oz)	18/13	2025-02-13	
Nikkor	28–400mm	f/4–8	FX	VR	Yes	No		External	0.2 m (0.66 ft)	1:2.9	77 mm	85 mm (3.3 in)	142 mm (5.6 in)	725 g (25.6 oz)	21/15	2024-03-27	
Nikkor	35mm	f/1.2	FX	S	No	Yes	L-Fn	Prime	0.3 m (0.98 ft)	1:5	82 mm	90 mm (3.5 in)	150 mm (5.9 in)	1,060 g (37 oz)	17/15	2025-02-05	
Nikkor	35mm	f/1.4	FX		No	No		Prime	0.27 m (0.89 ft)	1:5.5	62 mm	74.5 mm (2.93 in)	86.5 mm (3.41 in)	415 g (14.6 oz)	11/9	2024-06-26	
Nikkor	35mm	f/1.8	FX	S	No	Yes		Prime	0.25 m (0.82 ft)	1:5.3	62 mm	73 mm (2.9 in)	86 mm (3.4 in)	370 g (13 oz)	11/9	2018-08-23	
Nikkor	35mm	f/1.7	DX	MC	No	No		Prime	0.16 m (0.52 ft)	1:1.5	52 mm	70 mm (2.8 in)	72 mm (2.8 in)	220 g (7.8 oz)	8/7	2025-10-16	
Nikkor	40mm	f/2	FX		No	No		Prime	0.29 m (0.95 ft)	1:5.8	52 mm	70 mm (2.8 in)	45.5 mm (1.79 in)	170 g (6.0 oz)	6/4	2021-09-14	
Nikkor	40mm	f/2	FX	SE	No	No		Prime	0.29 m (0.95 ft)	1:5.8	52 mm	71.5 mm (2.81 in)	45.5 mm (1.79 in)	170 g (6.0 oz)	6/4	2022-12-14	
Nikkor	50mm	f/1.2	FX	S	No	Yes	L‑Fn	Prime	0.45 m (1.5 ft)	1:6.7	82 mm	89.5 mm (3.52 in)	150 mm (5.9 in)	1,090 g (38 oz)	17/15	2020-09-16	
Nikkor	50mm	f/1.4	FX		No	No		Prime	0.37 m (1.2 ft)	1:5.8	62 mm	74.5 mm (2.93 in)	86.5 mm (3.41 in)	420 g (15 oz)	10/7	2024-09-10	
Nikkor	50mm	f/1.8	FX	S	No	Yes		Prime	0.4 m (1.3 ft)	1:6.7	62 mm	76 mm (3.0 in)	86.5 mm (3.41 in)	415 g (14.6 oz)	12/9	2018-08-23	
Nikkor	50mm	f/2.8	FX	MC	No	No		Prime	0.16 m (0.52 ft)	1:1	46 mm	74.5 mm (2.93 in)	66 mm (2.6 in)	260 g (9.2 oz)	10/7	2021-06-02	
Nikkor	50–250mm	f/4.5–6.3	DX	VR	Yes	No		External	0.5 m (1.6 ft)	1:4.3	62 mm	74 mm (2.9 in)	110 mm (4.3 in)	405 g (14.3 oz)	16/12	2019-10-10	
Nikkor	58mm	f/0.95	FX	S Noct	No	Yes	L‑Fn	Prime	0.5 m (1.6 ft)	1:5.3	82 mm	102 mm (4.0 in)	153 mm (6.0 in)	2,000 g (71 oz)	17/10	2019-10-10	
Nikkor	70–180mm	f/2.8	FX		No	No		External	0.27 m (0.89 ft)	1:2	67 mm	83.5 mm (3.29 in)	151 mm (5.9 in)	795 g (28.0 oz)	19/14	2023-06-21	
Nikkor	70–200mm	f/2.8	FX	VR S	Yes	Yes	L‑Fn; L‑Fn2 ×4	Internal	0.5 m (1.6 ft)	1:5	77 mm	89 mm (3.5 in)	220 mm (8.7 in)	1,440 g (51 oz)	21/18	2020-01-07	
Nikkor	70–200mm	f/2.8	FX	VR S II	Yes	Yes	L‑Fn ×2; L‑Fn2 ×4	Internal	0.38–0.80 m (1.2–2.6 ft)	1:3.3	77 mm	90 mm (3.5 in)	208 mm (8.2 in)	1,180 g (42 oz)	18/16	2026-02-24	
Nikkor	85mm	f/1.2	FX	S	No	Yes	L‑Fn	Prime	0.85 m (2.8 ft)	1:9	82 mm	102.5 mm (4.04 in)	141.5 mm (5.57 in)	1,160 g (41 oz)	15/10	2023-02-07	
Nikkor	85mm	f/1.8	FX	S	No	Yes		Prime	0.8 m (2.6 ft)	1:8.3	67 mm	75 mm (3.0 in)	99 mm (3.9 in)	470 g (17 oz)	12/8	2019-07-31	
Nikkor	100–400mm	f/4.5–5.6	FX	VR S	Yes	Yes	L‑Fn; L‑Fn2 ×4	External	0.75 m (2.5 ft)	1:2.6	77 mm	98 mm (3.9 in)	222 mm (8.7 in)	1,435 g (50.6 oz)	25/20	2021-10-28	
Nikkor	105mm	f/2.8	FX	MC VR S	Yes	Yes	L‑Fn	Prime	0.29 m (0.95 ft)	1:1	62 mm	85 mm (3.3 in)	140 mm (5.5 in)	630 g (22 oz)	16/11	2021-06-02	
Nikkor	120-300mm (168–420mm)	f/2.8 (f/4)	FX	TC VR S	Yes	Yes	L‑Fn	External	0.98–2.0 m (3.2–6.6 ft)	1:5.6	112 mm 46 mm	128 mm (5.0 in)	353.5 mm (13.92 in)	2,735 g (96.5 oz)	30/24	2026-10-29	
Nikkor	135mm	f/1.8	FX	S Plena	No	Yes	L‑Fn ×2	Prime	0.82 m (2.7 ft)	1:5	82 mm	98 mm (3.9 in)	139.5 mm (5.49 in)	995 g (35.1 oz)	16/14	2023-09-27	
Nikkor	180–600mm	f/5.6–6.3	FX	VR	Yes	No	L‑Fn ×4	Internal	1.3 m (4.3 ft)	1:4	95 mm	110 mm (4.3 in)	315.5 mm (12.42 in)	2,140 g (75 oz)	25/17	2023-06-21	
Nikkor	400mm (560mm)	f/2.8 (f/4)	FX	TC VR S	Yes	Yes	L‑Fn; L‑Fn2 ×4; Memset	Prime	2.5 m (8.2 ft)	1:4.1	46 mm	156 mm (6.1 in)	380 mm (15 in)	2,950 g (104 oz)	25/19	2022-01-19	
Nikkor	400mm	f/4.5	FX	VR S	Yes	Yes	L‑Fn; L‑Fn2 ×4; Memset	Prime	2.5 m (8.2 ft)	1:6.3	95 mm	104 mm (4.1 in)	234.5 mm (9.23 in)	1,245 g (43.9 oz)	19/13	2022-06-26	
Nikkor	600mm (840mm)	f/4 (f/5.6)	FX	TC VR S	Yes	Yes	L‑Fn; L‑Fn2 ×4; Memset	Prime	4.3 m (14 ft)	1:5	46 mm	165 mm (6.5 in)	437 mm (17.2 in)	3,260 g (115 oz)	26/20	2022-11-02	
Nikkor	600mm	f/6.3	FX	VR PF S	Yes	Yes	L‑Fn; L‑Fn2 ×4; Memset	Prime	4 m (13 ft)	1:6.6	95 mm	106.5 mm (4.19 in)	278 mm (10.9 in)	1,470 g (52 oz)	21/14	2023-10-11	
Nikkor	800mm	f/6.3	FX	VR PF S	Yes	Yes	L‑Fn; L‑Fn2 ×4; Memset	Prime	5 m (16 ft)	1:6.2	46 mm	140 mm (5.5 in)	385 mm (15.2 in)	2,385 g (84.1 oz)	22/14	2022-04-06	
7Artisans	10mm	f/2.5	FX	Max	No	na	FN1; FN2	Prime	0.15 m (0.49 ft)	?	No	76 mm (3.0 in)	94 mm (3.7 in)	510 g (18 oz)	11/8	2026-08-26	
7Artisans	10mm	f/2.8	DX		No	na		Prime	0.3 m (0.98 ft)	?	62 mm	69 mm (2.7 in)	70 mm (2.8 in)	232 g (8.2 oz)	11/10	2025-09-28	
7Artisans	24mm	f/1.8	FX		No	na	L-Fn	Prime	0.32 m (1.0 ft)	1:11.1	62 mm	72 mm (2.8 in)	92 mm (3.6 in)	424 g (15.0 oz)	14/11	2025-09-22	
7Artisans	25mm	f/1.8	DX	Lite	No	na		Prime	0.25 m (0.82 ft)	?	58 mm	67 mm (2.6 in)	51 mm (2.0 in)	183 g (6.5 oz)	8/5	2026-06-15	
7Artisans	27mm	f/2.8	DX		No	na		Prime	0.3 m (0.98 ft)	?	39 mm	67 mm (2.6 in)	43 mm (1.7 in)	163 g (5.7 oz)	6/5	2024-08-06	
7Artisans	35mm	f/1.8	FX		No	na	L-Fn	Prime	0.4 m (1.3 ft)	?	62 mm	72 mm (2.8 in)	94 mm (3.7 in) approx.	426 g (15.0 oz)	11/8	2025-10-15	
7Artisans	35mm	f/1.8	DX	Lite	No	na		Prime	0.35 m (1.1 ft)	?	58 mm	67 mm (2.6 in)	51 mm (2.0 in)	181 g (6.4 oz)	7/6	2026-06-15	
7Artisans	40mm	f/2.5	FX	Lite	No	na	L-Fn	Prime	0.4 m (1.3 ft)	?	46 mm	63 mm (2.5 in)	40 mm (1.6 in)	~90 g (3.2 oz)	7/6	2026-08-05	
7Artisans	50mm	f/1.8	FX		No	na		Prime	0.5 m (1.6 ft)	?	62 mm	72 mm (2.8 in)	104 mm (4.1 in)	421 g (14.9 oz)	11/9	2024-04-26	
7Artisans	50mm	f/1.8	DX	Lite	No	na		Prime	0.55 m (1.8 ft)	?	58 mm	67 mm (2.6 in)	51 mm (2.0 in)	178 g (6.3 oz)	6/5	2026-06-15	
7Artisans	85mm	f/1.8	FX		No	na		Prime	0.8 m (2.6 ft)	?	62 mm	72 mm (2.8 in)	96 mm (3.8 in)	437.5 g (15.43 oz)	10/7	2024-09-30	
7Artisans	135mm	f/1.8	FX	Max	No	na	FN1; FN2	Prime	0.68 m (2.2 ft)	1:4	82 mm	91.2 mm (3.59 in)	130 mm (5.1 in)	1,014 g (35.8 oz)	16/13	2026-05-20	
AstrHori	27mm	f/2.8	DX		No	na		Prime	0.3 m (0.98 ft)	?	39 mm	67 mm (2.6 in)	43 mm (1.7 in)	167 g (5.9 oz)	6/5	2024-11-15	
AstrHori	85mm	f/1.8	FX		No	na		Prime	0.79 m (2.6 ft)	?	72 mm	80 mm (3.1 in)	93 mm (3.7 in)	626 g (22.1 oz)	9/8	2024-05-21	
AstrHori	85mm	f/1.8	FX	II	No	na	L-Fn	Prime	0.8 m (2.6 ft)	?	62 mm	72 mm (2.8 in)	96 mm (3.8 in)	441 g (15.6 oz)	10/7	2025-10-22	
Brightin Star	24mm	f/1.8	FX		No	na	L-Fn	Prime	0.32 m (1.0 ft)	?	62 mm	75 mm (3.0 in)	90 mm (3.5 in)	448 g (15.8 oz)	14/11	2025-12-12	
Brightin Star	35mm	f/1.8	FX		No	na	L-Fn	Prime	0.4 m (1.3 ft)	?	62 mm	75 mm (3.0 in)	90 mm (3.5 in)	430 g (15 oz)	11/8	2025-08-04	
Brightin Star	85mm	f/1.8	FX		No	na	L-Fn	Prime	0.8 m (2.6 ft)	?	62 mm	79 mm (3.1 in)	89 mm (3.5 in)	510 g (18 oz)	10/7	2025-05-30	
Kase	85mm	f/1.4	FX		No	na	L‑Fn ×2	Prime	0.7 m (2.3 ft)	?	72 mm	82 mm (3.2 in)	99 mm (3.9 in)	580 g (20 oz)	13/10	2025–07	
Laowa	10mm	f/2.8	FX	Zero-D	No	na		Prime	0.12 m (0.39 ft)	1:4.2	77 mm	82 mm (3.2 in)	70.8 mm (2.79 in)	440 g (16 oz)	15/9	2024-02-20	
Laowa	12mm	f/2.8	FX	Lite Zero-D	No	na		Prime	0.14 m (0.46 ft)	1:4.8	72 mm	77 mm (3.0 in)	76.5 mm (3.01 in)	390 g (14 oz)	16/9	2025-06-26	
Laowa	35mm	f/2.8	FX	ACRIS Macro	No	na	L-Fn	Prime	18 cm (0.59 ft)	1:1	72 mm	75 mm (3.0 in)	114 mm (4.5 in)	570 g (20 oz)	13/10	2026-09-30	
Laowa	180mm	f/4.5	FX	1.5x Ultra Macro APO	No	na	L-Fn	Prime	0.3 m (0.98 ft)	1.5:1	62 mm	67.6 mm (2.66 in)	134.4 mm (5.29 in)	545 g (19.2 oz)	12/9	2025-09-16	
Laowa	200mm	f/2	FX	C-Dreamer	No	na	L-Fn	Prime	1.5 m (4.9 ft)	1:6.7	105 mm 43 mm	118 mm (4.6 in)	176.8 mm (6.96 in)	1,588 g (56.0 oz)	11/9	2025-10-15	
Meike	23mm	f/1.4	DX	NEO	No	na		Prime	0.25 m (0.82 ft)	?	58 mm	66.5 mm (2.62 in)	81 mm (3.2 in)	302 g (10.7 oz)	13/11	2026-01-05	
Meike	24mm	f/1.4	FX	MIX	No	na		Prime	0.28 m (0.92 ft)	?	72 mm	79 mm (3.1 in)	109 mm (4.3 in)	560 g (20 oz)	15/12	2025-08-08	
Meike	33mm	f/1.4	DX		No	na		Prime	0.40 m (1.3 ft)	?	55 mm	66.5 mm (2.62 in)	84 mm (3.3 in)	314 g (11.1 oz)	12/9	2024-07-13	
Meike	35mm	f/1.8	FX	Pro	No	na		Prime	0.35 m (1.1 ft)	?	58 mm	74 mm (2.9 in)	93 mm (3.7 in)	404 g (14.3 oz)	12/10	2025-09-04	
Meike	35mm	f/2	FX	STM	No	na		Prime	0.45 m (1.5 ft)	?	58 mm	73 mm (2.9 in)	93 mm (3.7 in)	300 g (11 oz)	11/9	2024-??-??	
Meike	50mm	f/1.8	FX		No	na		Prime	0.63 m (2.1 ft)	?	58 mm	73 mm (2.9 in)		382 g (13.5 oz)	11/7	2024-??-??	
Meike	55mm	f/1.4	DX		No	na		Prime	0.61 m (2.0 ft)	?	52 mm	66.5 mm (2.62 in)	76 mm (3.0 in)	289 g (10.2 oz)	11/8	2024-03-??	
Meike	55mm	f/1.8	FX	Pro STM	No	na		Prime	0.55 m (1.8 ft)	?	58 mm	74 mm (2.9 in)		364 g (12.8 oz)	11/8	2024-09-21	
Meike	56mm	f/1.7	DX	AIR	No	na		Prime	0.55 m (1.8 ft)	?	58 mm	66.5 mm (2.62 in)	59.2 mm (2.33 in)	190 g (6.7 oz)	11/7	2026-05-28	
Meike	58mm	f/1.2	DX	MIX	No	na	L‑Fn	Prime	0.62 m (2.0 ft)	?	62 mm	76 mm (3.0 in)	90 mm (3.5 in)	455 g (16.0 oz)	14/10	2026-11-03	
Meike	85mm	f/1.4	FX	STM MIX	No	na	L-Fn	Prime	0.98 m (3.2 ft)	?	77 mm	84 mm (3.3 in)	127 mm (5.0 in)	735 g (25.9 oz)	13/8	2023-09-25	
Meike	85mm	f/1.4	FX	STM MIX II	No	na	L-Fn	Prime	0.81 m (2.7 ft)	?	77 mm	85 mm (3.3 in)	110 mm (4.3 in)	656 g (23.1 oz)	15/11	2026-07-17	
Meike	85mm	f/1.8	FX	STM	No	na		Prime	0.9 m (3.0 ft)	?	67 mm	79.5 mm (3.13 in)	?	386 g (13.6 oz)	9/6	2023-03-24	
Meike	85mm	f/1.8	FX	Pro STM	No	na		Prime	0.85 m (2.8 ft)	?	62 mm	76 mm (3.0 in)	97 mm (3.8 in)	395 g (13.9 oz)	11/8	2024-11-15	
Meike	85mm	f/1.8	FX	SE II	No	na		Prime	0.65 m (2.1 ft)	?	62 mm	76 mm (3.0 in)	100.2 mm (3.94 in)	379 g (13.4 oz)	11/7	2025-11-12	
Rollei	24mm	f/1.8	FX	STM	No	na	L‑Fn	Prime	0.32 m (1.0 ft)	?	62 mm	96 mm (3.8 in)	80 mm (3.1 in)	483 g (17.0 oz)	14/11	2026-01-16	
Rollei	35mm	f/1.8	FX	STM	No	na	L‑Fn	Prime	0.40 m (1.3 ft)	?	62 mm	93 mm (3.7 in)	80 mm (3.1 in)	498 g (17.6 oz)	11/8	2026-01-19	
Rollei	85mm	f/1.8	FX	STM	No	na	L‑Fn	Prime	0.85 m (2.8 ft)	?	62 mm	96 mm (3.8 in)	80 mm (3.1 in)	477 g (16.8 oz)	10/7	2025-06-11	
SG-Image	25mm	f/1.8	DX		No	na		Prime	0.3 m (0.98 ft)	1:10	52 mm	67 mm (2.6 in)	32 mm (1.3 in)	152 g (5.4 oz)	7/5	2025-10-10	
SG-Image	35mm	f/2.2	FX		No	na		Prime	0.35 m (1.1 ft)	1:7.7	52 mm	69 mm (2.7 in)	36.2 mm (1.43 in)	163 g (5.7 oz)	7/5	2026-07-14	
SG-Image	55mm	f/1.8	FX		No	na		Prime	0.5 m (1.6 ft)	1:9.1	58 mm	69 mm (2.7 in)	78 mm (3.1 in)	365 g (12.9 oz)	10/8	2024-12-27	
SG-Image	85mm	f/1.8	FX		No	na		Prime	0.8 m (2.6 ft)	1:7.7	58 mm	71 mm (2.8 in)	91.2 mm (3.59 in)	390 g (14 oz)	11/9	2025–10	
Sigma	16mm	f/1.4	DX	DC DN	No	na		Prime	0.25 m (0.82 ft)	1:9.9	67 mm	72.2 mm (2.84 in)	94.3 mm (3.71 in)	420 g (15 oz)	16/13	2023-04-01	
Sigma	16-300mm	f/3.5–6.7	DX	DC OS	Yes	na		External	0.17 m (0.56 ft)	1:2	67 mm	73.8 mm (2.91 in)	125.4 mm (4.94 in)	630 g (22 oz)	20/14	2026-11-05	
Sigma	30mm	f/1.4	DX	DC DN	No	na		Prime	0.3 m (0.98 ft)	1:7	52 mm	70 mm (2.8 in)	75.3 mm (2.96 in)	285 g (10.1 oz)	9/7	2023-04-01	
Sigma	56mm	f/1.4	DX	DC DN	No	na		Prime	0.5 m (1.6 ft)	1:7.4	55 mm	70 mm (2.8 in)	61.5 mm (2.42 in)	295 g (10.4 oz)	10/6	2023-04-01	
Sirui	16mm	f/1.2	DX	Sniper	No	na		Prime	0.30 m (0.98 ft)	?	58 mm	72 mm (2.8 in)	96 mm (3.8 in)	403 g (14.2 oz)	14/5	2024-??-??	
Sirui	20mm	T1.8	DX	1.33x S35 Anamorphic	No	na	AF lock	Prime	0.40 m (1.3 ft)	1:15/1:20	77 mm	86.4 mm (3.40 in)	92.95 mm (3.659 in)	501.1 g (17.68 oz)	16/12	2025-02-21	
Sirui	23mm	f/1.2	DX	Sniper	No	na		Prime	0.30 m (0.98 ft)	?	58 mm	62 mm (2.4 in)	92.5 mm (3.64 in)	386 g (13.6 oz)	12/11	2023-??-??	
Sirui	33mm	f/1.2	DX	Sniper	No	na		Prime	0.40 m (1.3 ft)	?	58 mm		94.2 mm (3.71 in)	404 g (14.3 oz)	11/10	2023-??-??	
Sirui	35mm	f/1.4	FX	Aurora	No	na	AF lock	Prime	0.35 m (1.1 ft)	1:7.1	62 mm	76 mm (3.0 in)	104.9 mm (4.13 in)	505 g (17.8 oz)	16/11	2025-09-15	
Sirui	40mm	T1.8	DX	1.33x S35 Anamorphic	No	na	AF lock	Prime	0.6 m (2.0 ft)	1:19/1:14	77 mm		129.9 mm (5.11 in)	643 g (22.7 oz)	16/12	2024-12-09	
Sirui	50mm	T1.8	FX	Astra 1.33x Anamorphic	No	na	AF lock	Prime	0.5 m (1.6 ft)	1:7.2/1:10.2	67 mm	80 mm (3.1 in)	133 mm (5.2 in)	636 g (22.4 oz)	18/14	2025-11-14	
Sirui	56mm	f/1.2	DX	Sniper	No	na		Prime	0.60 m (2.0 ft)	?	58 mm		94.2 mm (3.71 in)	427 g (15.1 oz)	12/11	2023-??-??	
Sirui	75mm	f/1.2	DX	Sniper	No	na		Prime	0.7 m (2.3 ft)	?	67 mm		95.8 mm (3.77 in)	466 g (16.4 oz)	13/9	2024-06-14	
Sirui	75mm	T1.8	FX	Astra 1.33x Anamorphic	No	na	AF lock	Prime	0.6 m (2.0 ft)	?	67 mm	80 mm (3.1 in)	133 mm (5.2 in)	666 g (23.5 oz)	18/13	2025-11-14	
Sirui	85mm	f/1.4	FX	Aurora	No	na	AF lock	Prime	0.85 m (2.8 ft)	1:8.7	67 mm	105 mm (4.1 in)	80.3 mm (3.16 in)	570 g (20 oz)	14/9	2024-10-25	
Sirui	100mm	T1.8	FX	Astra 1.33x Anamorphic	No	na	AF lock	Prime	0.7 m (2.3 ft)	1:7.5/1:10	67 mm	80 mm (3.1 in)	137.3 mm (5.41 in)	716 g (25.3 oz)	18/13	2025-11-14	
SongRaw	50mm	f/1.2	FX	Moonlit	No	na	L-Fn	Prime	0.52 m (1.7 ft)	1:7.7	72 mm	89.5 mm (3.52 in)	150 mm (5.9 in)	1,090 g (38 oz)	15/10	2025-10-15	
Tamron	12-20mm	f/2.8	FX		No	na	L-Fn	Internal	0.18–0.28 m (0.59–0.92 ft)	1:5.8 (W); 1:9.1 (T)	40 mm	90 mm (3.5 in)	121.3 mm (4.78 in)	585 g (20.6 oz)	17/12	2026-08-27	
Tamron	16-30mm	f/2.8	FX	Di III VXD G2	No	na		Internal	0.19–0.3 m (0.62–0.98 ft)	1:5.4 (W); 1:7 (T)	67 mm	74.8 mm (2.94 in)	103.9 mm (4.09 in)	450 g (16 oz)	16/12	2025-07-01	
Tamron	16–50mm	f/2.8	DX	A	No	na		External	0.15–0.29 m (0.49–0.95 ft)	1:4.5 (W); 1:4.8 (T)	55 mm	70 mm (2.8 in)	81.6 mm (3.21 in)	315 g (11.1 oz)	14/10	2026-11-19	
Tamron	17-70mm	f/2.8	DX	Di III-A VC RXD	Yes	na		External	0.191 m (0.63 ft)	1:4.8	67 mm	74.6 mm (2.94 in)	121.3 mm (4.78 in)	540 g (19 oz)	16/12	2026-06-23	
Tamron	18-300mm	f/3.5–6.3	DX	Di III-A VC VXD	Yes	na		External	0.15–0.99 m (0.49–3.25 ft)	1:2 (W); 1:4 (T)	67 mm	75.5 mm (2.97 in)	125.6 mm (4.94 in)	635 g (22.4 oz)	19/15	2025-08-07	
Tamron	20-40mm	f/2.8	FX	Di III VXD	No	na		External	0.17–0.29 m (0.56–0.95 ft)	1:3.8 (W); 1:5.1 (T)	67 mm	74.4 mm (2.93 in)	88.7 mm (3.49 in)	380 g (13 oz)	12/11	2026-10-22	
Tamron	28-75mm	f/2.8	FX	Di III VXD G2	No	na		External	0.18–0.38 m (0.59–1.25 ft)	1:2.7 (W); 1:4.1 (T)	67 mm	78.8 mm (3.10 in)	117.6 mm (4.63 in)	540 g (19 oz)	17/15	2024-04-18	
Tamron	35-100mm	f/2.8	FX	Di III VXD	No	na	L‑Fn	External	0.22–0.65 m (0.72–2.13 ft)	1:3.3 (W); 1:5.9 (T)	67 mm	80.6 mm (3.17 in)	121.5 mm (4.78 in)	575 g (20.3 oz)	15/13	2026-03-26	
Tamron	35-150mm	f/2–2.8	FX	Di III VXD	No	na	L‑Fn? ×3	External	0.33–0.85 m (1.1–2.8 ft)	1:5.7	82 mm	89.2 mm (3.51 in)	158 mm (6.2 in)	1,190 g (42 oz)	21/15	2023-07-25	
Tamron	50-400mm	f/4.5–6.3	FX	Di III VC VXD	Yes	na	L‑Fn	External	0.25–1.5 m (0.82–4.92 ft)	1:2 (W); 1:4 (T)	67 mm	88.5 mm (3.48 in)	183.4 mm (7.22 in)	1,180 g (42 oz)	24/18	2024-08-29	
Tamron	70-180mm	f/2.8	FX	Di III VC VXD G2	Yes	na	L-Fn	External	0.3–0.85 m (0.98–2.79 ft)	1:2.6 (W); 1:4.7 (T)	67 mm	83 mm (3.3 in)	158.7 mm (6.25 in)	865 g (30.5 oz)	20/15	2025-10-23	
Tamron	70-300mm	f/4.5–6.3	FX	Di III RXD	No	na		External	0.8–1.5 m (2.6–4.9 ft)	1:9.4 (W); 1:5.1 (T)	67 mm	77 mm (3.0 in)	148 mm (5.8 in)	580 g (20 oz)	15/10	2022-09-07	
Tamron	90mm	f/2.8	FX	Di III Macro VXD	No	na	AF lock	Prime	0.23 m (0.75 ft)	1:1	67 mm	79.2 mm (3.12 in)	128.5 mm (5.06 in)	455 g (16.0 oz)	15/12	2024-09-26	
Tamron	150-500mm	f/5–6.7	FX	Di III VC VXD	Yes	na		External	0.6–1.8 m (2.0–5.9 ft)	1:3.1	82 mm	93 mm (3.7 in)	209.6 mm (8.25 in)	1,720 g (61 oz)	25/16	2023-10-10	
TTArtisan	17mm	f/1.8	DX	Air	No	na		Prime	0.18 m (0.59 ft)	?	52 mm	65 mm (2.6 in)	51 mm (2.0 in)	178 g (6.3 oz)	14/10	2026-07-10	
TTArtisan	23mm	f/1.8	DX		No	na		Prime	0.3 m (0.98 ft)	?	52 mm	64 mm (2.5 in)	62 mm (2.4 in)	210 g (7.4 oz)	11/9	2025-01-13	
TTArtisan	27mm	f/2.8	DX		No	na		Prime	0.35 m (1.1 ft)	?	39 mm	61 mm (2.4 in)	29 mm (1.1 in)	100 g (3.5 oz)	6/5	2023-04-07	
TTArtisan	32mm	f/2.8	FX		No	na		Prime	0.5 m (1.6 ft)	?	27 mm	63 mm (2.5 in)	50 mm (2.0 in)	196 g (6.9 oz)	9/6	2022-03-28	
TTArtisan	35mm	f/1.8	DX		No	na		Prime	0.6 m (2.0 ft)	?	52 mm	64 mm (2.5 in)	61 mm (2.4 in)	205 g (7.2 oz)	10/8	2023-10-09	
TTArtisan	35mm	f/1.8	DX	II	No	na		Prime	0.4 m (1.3 ft)	?	52 mm	65 mm (2.6 in)	49 mm (1.9 in)	193 g (6.8 oz)	10/7	2024-12-31	
TTArtisan	40mm	f/2	FX		No	na		Prime	0.4 m (1.3 ft)	?	52 mm	65 mm (2.6 in)	46 mm (1.8 in)	176 g (6.2 oz)	9/6	2025-08-08	
TTArtisan	50mm	f/1.8	FX	Neo	No	na		Prime	0.48 m (1.6 ft)	?	52 mm	66 mm (2.6 in)	54 mm (2.1 in)	167 g (5.9 oz)	12/8	2026-07-03	
TTArtisan	56mm	f/1.8	DX		No	na		Prime	0.5 m (1.6 ft)	?	52 mm	65 mm (2.6 in)	62 mm (2.4 in)	245 g (8.6 oz)	10/9	2023-12-12	
TTArtisan	75mm	f/2	FX		No	na		Prime	0.75 m (2.5 ft)	?	62 mm	68 mm (2.7 in)	69 mm (2.7 in)	340 g (12 oz)	10/7	2024-09-12	
TTArtisan	85mm	f/1.8	FX	Neo	No	na		Prime	0.8 m (2.6 ft)	?	62 mm	70 mm (2.8 in)	92 mm (3.6 in)	338 g (11.9 oz)	12/8	2026-06-20	
Viltrox	9mm	f/2.8	DX	Air	No	na		Prime	0.13 m (0.43 ft)	1:6.7	58 mm	65 mm (2.6 in)	58.4 mm (2.30 in)	190 g (6.7 oz)	13/11	2025-09-19	
Viltrox	13mm	f/1.4	DX		No	na		Prime	0.22 m (0.72 ft)	1:10	67 mm	74 mm (2.9 in)	92 mm (3.6 in)	455 g (16.0 oz)	14/11	2022-06-03	
Viltrox	14mm	f/4	FX	Air	No	na		Prime	0.13 m (0.43 ft)	1:4.4	58 mm	68 mm (2.7 in)	58.4 mm (2.30 in)	185 g (6.5 oz)	12/9	2025-09-19	
Viltrox	15mm	f/1.7	DX	Air	No	na		Prime	0.23 m (0.75 ft)	1:10	58 mm	65 mm (2.6 in)	58.5 mm (2.30 in)	195 g (6.9 oz)	12/10	2025-07-30	
Viltrox	16mm	f/1.8	FX		No	na	L-Fn; L-Fn2	Prime	0.27 m (0.89 ft)	1:10	77 mm	85.2 mm (3.35 in)	103 mm (4.1 in)	550 g (19 oz)	15/12	2024-05-02	
Viltrox	20mm	f/2.8	FX		No	na		Prime	0.19 m (0.62 ft)	1:5.9	52 mm	60.8 mm (2.39 in)	66 mm (2.6 in)	173 g (6.1 oz)	10/8	2024-01-26	
Viltrox	23mm	f/1.4	DX		No	na		Prime	0.3 m (0.98 ft)	1:10	52 mm	69 mm (2.7 in)	73 mm (2.9 in)	300 g (11 oz)	11/10	2021-08-20	
Viltrox	24mm	f/1.8	FX		No	na		Prime	0.29 m (0.95 ft)	1:10	55 mm	70 mm (2.8 in)	87 mm (3.4 in)	370 g (13 oz)	11/9	2021-09-22	
Viltrox	25mm	f/1.7	DX	Air	No	na		Prime	0.3 m (0.98 ft)	1:9.1	52 mm	64 mm (2.5 in)	56.4 mm (2.22 in)	180 g (6.3 oz)	12/10	2025-02-28	
Viltrox	26mm	f/2.8	FX	EVO	No	na		Prime	0.2 m (0.66 ft)	1:5	43 mm	69.4 mm (2.73 in)	25.8 mm (1.02 in)	170 g (6.0 oz)	8/6	2026-07-15	
Viltrox	27mm	f/1.2	DX	Pro	No	na		Prime	0.28 m (0.92 ft)	1:6.7	67 mm	82 mm (3.2 in)	94 mm (3.7 in)	605 g (21.3 oz)	15/11	2024-02-23	
Viltrox	28mm	f/1.8	FX		No	na		Prime	0.37 m (1.2 ft)	1:10	55 mm	70 mm (2.8 in)	88.2 mm (3.47 in)	367 g (12.9 oz)	11/9	2023-08-29	
Viltrox	28mm	f/4.5	FX	Chip	No	na		Prime	0.35 m (1.1 ft)	1:10	No	65.3 mm (2.57 in)	16.8 mm (0.66 in)	80 g (2.8 oz)	6/6	2025-05-28	
Viltrox	33mm	f/1.4	DX		No	na		Prime	0.4 m (1.3 ft)	1:10	52 mm	69 mm (2.7 in)	73 mm (2.9 in)	310 g (11 oz)	10/9	2021-08-23	
Viltrox	35mm	f/1.2	FX	LAB	No	na	L-Fn; L-Fn2	Prime	0.34 m (1.1 ft)	1:5.9	77 mm	89.2 mm (3.51 in)	123.5 mm (4.86 in)	970 g (34 oz)	15/10	2025-12-17	
Viltrox	35mm	f/1.4	FX	Pro	No	na	L-Fn	Prime	0.3 m (0.98 ft)	1:5.6	77 mm	84.5 mm (3.33 in)	112.5 mm (4.43 in)	780 g (28 oz)	16/11	2026-10-29	
Viltrox	35mm	f/1.7	DX	Air	No	na		Prime	0.33 m (1.1 ft)	1:7.7	52 mm	64 mm (2.5 in)	56.4 mm (2.22 in)	180 g (6.3 oz)	11/9	2024-12-18	
Viltrox	35mm	f/1.8	FX		No	na		Prime	0.4 m (1.3 ft)	1:10	55 mm	70 mm (2.8 in)	89.9 mm (3.54 in)	370 g (13 oz)	10/8	2021-09-22	
Viltrox	35mm	f/1.8	FX	II Evo	No	na	L-Fn	Prime	0.34 m (1.1 ft)	1:6.7	58 mm	69 mm (2.7 in)	78 mm (3.1 in)	375 g (13.2 oz)	13/10	2026-04-20	
Viltrox	40mm	f/2.5	FX	Air	No	na		Prime	0.34 m (1.1 ft)	1:7.1	55 mm	68 mm (2.7 in)	55.9 mm (2.20 in)	180 g (6.3 oz)	10/6	2024-04-26	
Viltrox	50mm	f/1.4	FX	Pro	No	na	L-Fn	Prime	0.45 m (1.5 ft)	1:6.9	77 mm	84.5 mm (3.33 in)	113 mm (4.4 in)	830 g (29 oz)	15/11	2026-02-10	
Viltrox	50mm	f/1.8	FX		No	na		Prime	0.55 m (1.8 ft)	1:10	55 mm	70 mm (2.8 in)	89.9 mm (3.54 in)	390 g (14 oz)	11/7	2021-12-14	
Viltrox	50mm	f/2	FX	Air	No	na		Prime	0.51 m (1.7 ft)	1:9.1	58 mm	68 mm (2.7 in)	58.6 mm (2.31 in)	220 g (7.8 oz)	13/9	2025-04-02	
Viltrox	55mm	f/1.8	FX	Evo	No	na	L-Fn	Prime	0.43 m (1.4 ft)	1:6.3	58 mm	69 mm (2.7 in)	78 mm (3.1 in)	390 g (14 oz)	13/9	2026-04-20	
Viltrox	56mm	f/1.2	DX	Pro	No	na	L-Fn	Prime	0.5 m (1.6 ft)	1:7.7	67 mm	78.4 mm (3.09 in)	94.1 mm (3.70 in)	595 g (21.0 oz)	13/8	2026-01-08	
Viltrox	56mm	f/1.4	DX		No	na		Prime	0.6 m (2.0 ft)	1:10	52 mm	69 mm (2.7 in)	73 mm (2.9 in)	320 g (11 oz)	10/9	2021-08-23	
Viltrox	56mm	f/1.7	DX	Air	No	na		Prime	0.55 m (1.8 ft)	1:9.1	52 mm	68 mm (2.7 in)	55.9 mm (2.20 in)	187 g (6.6 oz)	11/9	2024-02-04	
Viltrox	75mm	f/1.2	DX	Pro	No	na		Prime	0.88 m (2.9 ft)	1:10	77 mm	87 mm (3.4 in)	102 mm (4.0 in)	710 g (25 oz)	16/11	2023-08-01	
Viltrox	75mm	f/1.8	DX	Evo	No	na	L-Fn	Prime	0.74 m (2.4 ft)	1:8.3	58 mm	69 mm (2.7 in)	78 mm (3.1 in)	355 g (12.5 oz)	11/9	2026-06-08	
Viltrox	85mm	f/1.4	FX	Pro	No	na	L-Fn	Prime	0.79 m (2.6 ft)	1:7.7	77 mm	84.5 mm (3.33 in)	110.6 mm (4.35 in)	835 g (29.5 oz)	15/11	2025-11-19	
Viltrox	85mm	f/1.8	FX		No	na		Prime	0.80 m (2.6 ft)	1:7.7	72 mm	80 mm (3.1 in)	92 mm (3.6 in)	484 g (17.1 oz)	10/7	2020-12-10	
Viltrox	85mm	f/2	FX	Evo	No	na		Prime	0.74 m (2.4 ft)	1:7.7	58 mm	69 mm (2.7 in)	78 mm (3.1 in)	360 g (13 oz)	10/8	2025-11-05	
Viltrox	90mm	f/2.2	DX	Evo	No	na	L-Fn	Prime	0.74 m (2.4 ft)	1:7.1	58 mm	69 mm (2.7 in)	78 mm (3.1 in)	345 g (12.2 oz)	10/8	2026-06-08	
Viltrox	135mm	f/1.8	FX	LAB	No	na	L‑Fn ×2	Prime	0.72 m (2.4 ft)	1:4	82 mm	93 mm (3.7 in)	147.6 mm (5.81 in)	1,265 g (44.6 oz)	14/9	2025-03-19	
Yongnuo	11mm	f/1.8	DX	DA DSM WL	No	na	FN-A; FN-B	Prime	0.15 m (0.49 ft)	1:6.7	58 mm	68 mm (2.7 in)	70 mm (2.8 in)	290 g (10 oz)	10/9	2024-12	
Yongnuo	23mm	f/1.4	DX	DA DSM WL Pro	No	na		Prime	0.3 m (0.98 ft)	1:10	58 mm	69 mm (2.7 in)	87 mm (3.4 in)	368 g (13.0 oz)	11/9	2024-08-12	
Yongnuo	33mm	f/1.4	DX	DA DSM WL Pro	No	na		Prime	0.4 m (1.3 ft)	1:10	58 mm	69 mm (2.7 in)	89 mm (3.5 in)	378 g (13.3 oz)	11/9	2024-06-10	
Yongnuo	35mm	f/1.8	DX	DA DSM WL	No	na		Prime	0.3 m (0.98 ft)	1:6.7	52 mm	68 mm (2.7 in)	64 mm (2.5 in)	182 g (6.4 oz)	10/8	2024-10-07	
Yongnuo	35mm	f/2	FX	DF DSM	No	na		Prime	0.35 m (1.1 ft)	1:7.7	52 mm	68 mm (2.7 in)	73 mm (2.9 in)	290 g (10 oz)	9/8	2022-11-14	
Yongnuo	50mm	f/1.8	FX	DF DSM	No	na		Prime	0.45 m (1.5 ft)	1:6.6	58 mm	68 mm (2.7 in)	85 mm (3.3 in)	396 g (14.0 oz)	11/8	2022-05-30	
Yongnuo	50mm	f/1.8	FX	II DSM Lite	No	na		Prime	0.45 m (1.5 ft)	1:7.7	58 mm	68 mm (2.7 in)	80 mm (3.1 in)	282 g (9.9 oz)	10/6	2025–12	
Yongnuo	50mm	f/1.8	DX	DA DSM	No	na		Prime	0.45 m (1.5 ft)	1:7.1	49 mm	63 mm (2.5 in)	58 mm (2.3 in)	149 g (5.3 oz)	8/7	2024-01-19	
Yongnuo	56mm	f/1.4	DX	DA DSM WL Pro	No	na		Prime	0.60 m (2.0 ft)	1:9.1	58 mm	69 mm (2.7 in)	89 mm (3.5 in)	375 g (13.2 oz)	10/9	2024-??-??	
Yongnuo	85mm	f/1.8	FX	DF DSM	No	na		Prime	0.8 m (2.6 ft)	1:7.7	58 mm	67 mm (2.6 in)	88 mm (3.5 in)	346 g (12.2 oz)	9/8	2022-03-14	

== Other non-AF lenses ==
Collecting specifications for all third-party manual focus lenses isn't feasible due to the large number of brands producing a great variety of such lenses. However, some special-use manual focus lenses (perspective control and fisheye) are contained in the following sections.

=== Perspective control lenses ===
Perspective control lenses (PC), often called "tilt-shift lenses", offer adjustments that duplicate certain view camera movements.

The following table does not contain all PC lenses; it contains the specifications for six Z-mount manual focus tilt-shift and tilt-only lenses. None are S-line, nor do they have image stabilization, L-Fn buttons, or zoom. There are no autofocus tilt-shift lenses due to how they must be focused. Note that Nikon does not make a Z-mount lens of this type; classic F-mount Nikon PC-E lenses are usable via an FTZ II adapter,

Brand	Focal length	Aperture	FX/DX	Designations	Tilt angle	Shift amount	Angle of view	Mount rotation	Min Focus Dist	Mag.	Filter size	Diameter	Length	Weight	E/G	Rel date	Ref
Laowa	17mm	f/4	FX	Zero-D	±10°	±12mm	104°	360°	0.25 m (0.82 ft)	1:7.63	86 mm	93 mm (3.7 in)	111 mm (4.4 in)	810 g (29 oz)	18/12	2026-03-10	
Laowa	26mm	f/2	FX	Zero-D	±10°	±12mm	84°	360°	0.25 m (0.82 ft)	1:5.15	77 mm	93 mm (3.7 in)	119 mm (4.7 in)	860 g (30 oz)	13/10	2026-11-05	
Laowa	35mm	f/2.8	FX	Zero-D Macro	±10°	±12mm	87.5°	360°	22.8 m (75 ft)	1:2	77 mm	104.9 mm (4.13 in)	148.9 mm (5.86 in)	1,350 g (48 oz)	14/12	2025-11-25	
Laowa	100mm	f/2.8	FX	1X Macro	±10°	±12mm	37°	360°	0.32 m (1.0 ft)	1:1	77 mm	85 mm (3.3 in)	162 mm (6.4 in)	1,215 g (42.9 oz)	13/10	2024-12-17	
TTArtisan	17mm	f/4	FX	ASPH	±8°	±8mm	104°	360°	0.3 m (0.98 ft)	1:8.33	No	88 mm (3.5 in)	116 mm (4.6 in)	1,056 g (37.2 oz)	17/11	2025-10-10	
TTArtisan	35mm	f/1.4	DX	Tilt	±8°	No	45°	360°	0.35 m (1.1 ft)	?	52 mm	66 mm (2.6 in)	65 mm (2.6 in)	350 g (12 oz)	7/6	2025-05-09	

=== Fisheye lenses ===
Fisheye lenses are ultra wide-angle lenses that produces strong visual distortion intended to create a wide panoramic or hemispherical image. Fisheye lenses achieve extremely wide angles of view, well beyond any rectilinear lens.

The following table does not contain all fisheye lenses; it contains the specifications for three Z-mount manual focus fisheye lenses. None are S-line, nor do they have image stabilization, L-Fn buttons, or zoom. There are some autofocus fisheyes in the Table of Z-mount lenses. Note that Nikon does not make a Z-mount lens of this type; classic F-mount Fisheye lenses are usable via an FTZ II adapter.

Brand	Focal length	Aperture	FX/DX	Designations	Angle of view	Min Focus Dist	Mag.	Filter size	Diameter	Length	Weight	E/G	Rel date	Ref
7Artisans	10mm	f/2.8	FX	Mark II	185°	0.15 m (0.49 ft)	?	No	75 mm (3.0 in)	95 mm (3.7 in)	602 g (21.2 oz)	8/11	2024-11-24	
AstrHori	6.5mm	f/2	DX		192°	0.2 m (0.66 ft)	?	No	64 mm (2.5 in)	52 mm (2.0 in)	268 g (9.5 oz)	6/5	2025-04	
Laowa	4mm	f/2.8	DX	Fisheye	210°	0.8 m (2.6 ft)	1:9	No	45.2 mm (1.78 in)	25.5 mm (1.00 in)	135 g (4.8 oz)	7/6	2021-11-05	

== Firmware updates ==
Firmware updates are available from the Nikon website for all Nikon components of the Z-system: cameras, lenses, flashes, adapters, and teleconverters. They are released as needed to correct errors, enhance functionality, or add new capabilities. The component being updated must be currently attached to a Z-system camera (if not the camera itself), and can be updated using one of two methods:

1. The update file can be downloaded from the Nikon site and copied to the root directory of a memory card, which is then inserted into the camera's card slot. The update is then initiated using the camera's menu option.
2. The update can be downloaded via the paired Nikon SnapBridge app.

Firmware updates for third-party lenses and equipment and the techniques for updating vary; they are not integrated into the Nikon menuing system for updates. The manufacturer's website should be consulted for details. Many of the lenses (such as Viltrox and Tamron) have a USB-C port which is used during the update, along with possibly a dedicated utility from the manufacturer.

=== Alternative firmware ===
Until approximately October 2026, there were no alternate FW loads for Nikon Z-series cameras, only the multitude of menu options and frequent Nikon-provided FW updates.

Nikon’s firmware runs only internally (i.e., not off of a memory card). To be used, an alternate firmware file, including valid checksum, must be created and installed as a firmware update on the camera. Loading non-OEM firmware into a Z-camera invalidates the camera's warranty. Nikon does allow firmware to be reverted, assuming that the alternate firmware did not "brick" the camera.

As of November 2026, there have been alternate firmware loads for several Z-system cameras via the WonderLantern GitHub.

== See also ==
- Nikkor
- Nikon F-mount
- Nikon 1-mount
- Nikon S-mount
- Micro-Nikkor

Sensor	Class	2018	2019	2020	2021	2022	2023	2024	2025	2026
FX (Full-frame)	Flagship					^{8K} Z9 ^{S}				
FX (Full-frame)	Flagship							^{8K} Z8 ^{S}		
FX (Full-frame)	Professional		^{4K} Z7 ^{S}		^{4K} Z7Ⅱ ^{S}					
FX (Full-frame)	Professional		^{4K} Z6 ^{S}		^{4K} Z6Ⅱ ^{S}				^{6K} Z6Ⅲ ^{S}	
FX (Full-frame)	Cinema									^{6K} ZR ^{S}
FX (Full-frame)	Enthusiast							^{4K} Zf ^{S}		
FX (Full-frame)	Enthusiast				^{4K} Z5 ^{S}					^{4K} Z5Ⅱ ^{S}
FX (Full-frame)	Entry-level									^{4K} Z5ⅡC ^{S}
DX (APS-C)	Enthusiast								^{4K} Z50Ⅱ	
DX (APS-C)	Enthusiast					^{4K} Zfc				
DX (APS-C)	Prosumer			^{4K} Z50						
DX (APS-C)	Entry-level						^{4K} Z30			
Sensor	Class									
Sensor	Class	2018	2019	2020	2021	2022	2023	2024	2025	2026
