= Nikon Nikkor Z 135 mm f/1.8 S Plena =

Nikkor Z 135 mm f/1.8 S Plena
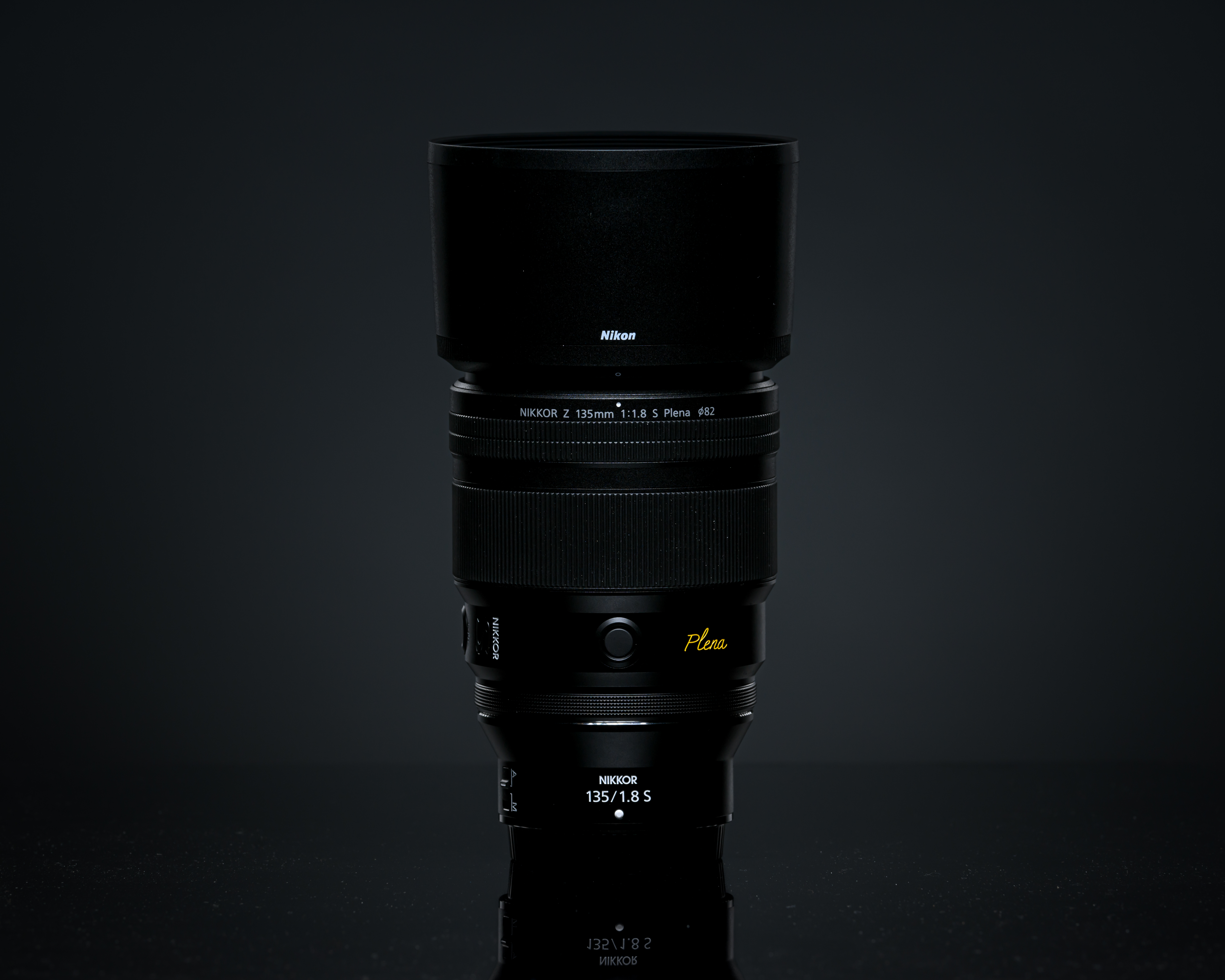
- Maker: Nikon
- Lens mount: Z-mount

Technical data
- Type: Prime
- Focus drive: Stepping motors
- Focal length: 135mm
- Image format: FX (full frame)
- Aperture (max/min): f/1.8–16
- Close focus distance: 0.82m
- Max. magnification: 1:5
- Diaphragm blades: 11 (rounded)
- Construction: 16 elements in 14 groups

Features
- Lens-based stabilization: No No
- Macro capable: No No
- Unique features: S-Line lens Meso Amorphous and ARNEO Coat elements SR element
- Application: Portrait

Physical
- Max. length: 139.5 mm
- Diameter: 98 mm
- Weight: 995 g
- Filter diameter: 82 mm

Software
- Lens ID: 46

Accessories
- Lens hood: HB-108 (bayonet)
- Case: CL-C2

Angle of view
- Diagonal: 18°10' (FX); 12° (DX)

History
- Introduction: September 2023

Retail info
- MSRP: 2499.95 USD (as of 2023)

The Nikon Nikkor Z 135 mm f/1.8 S Plena is a full-frame prime lens manufactured by Nikon for use on Nikon Z-mount mirrorless cameras.

The Plena is the second Nikkor Z-mount lens with a unique name (first being the Nikon Nikkor Z 58 mm f/0.95 S Noct), which is engraved in yellow into the metal lens barrel. According to Nikon, this mid-telephoto lens is built for edge-to-edge brightness, sharpness and dramatic, well-rounded bokeh even in the corners of the frame. Also according to Nikon, word "Plena" comes from the Latin "plenum" meaning full to the brim and overflowing, referring to the image properties and characteristics provided by the optics used in the lens. The lens’s projected image circle is significantly larger than the size of a full-frame sensor, this results in exceptionally low vignetting and minimal "cat's eye bokeh" in corners of image.

== Introduction ==
This lens was introduced on September 27, 2023. The lens comes with a bayonet lens hood (HB-108).

== Features ==
- 135 mm focal length (approximately equivalent field of view of a 202.5 mm lens when used on a DX format camera)
- S-Line lens
- "Multi-focusing" autofocusing system using dual stepping motors (STM), dedicated focus-by-wire manual focus ring
- 16 elements in 14 groups (including 4 ED glass, 1 aspherical and 1 short-wavelength refractive (SR) elements, elements with Meso Amorphous Coat and ARNEO Coat)
- 11-blade rounded diaphragm
- Internal focusing (IF lens)
- One customizable control ring at the back (aperture, ISO and exposure compensation functions can be assigned to it)
- Two L-Fn customizable function buttons (both assigned to a single, shared function)
- A/M switch for autofocus/manual focus modes

== Awards ==
The lens was awarded with the Red Dot Design Award 2024, the Japan Institute of Design Promotion Good Design 2024 award and the iF Design Award 2024.

== Sample images ==
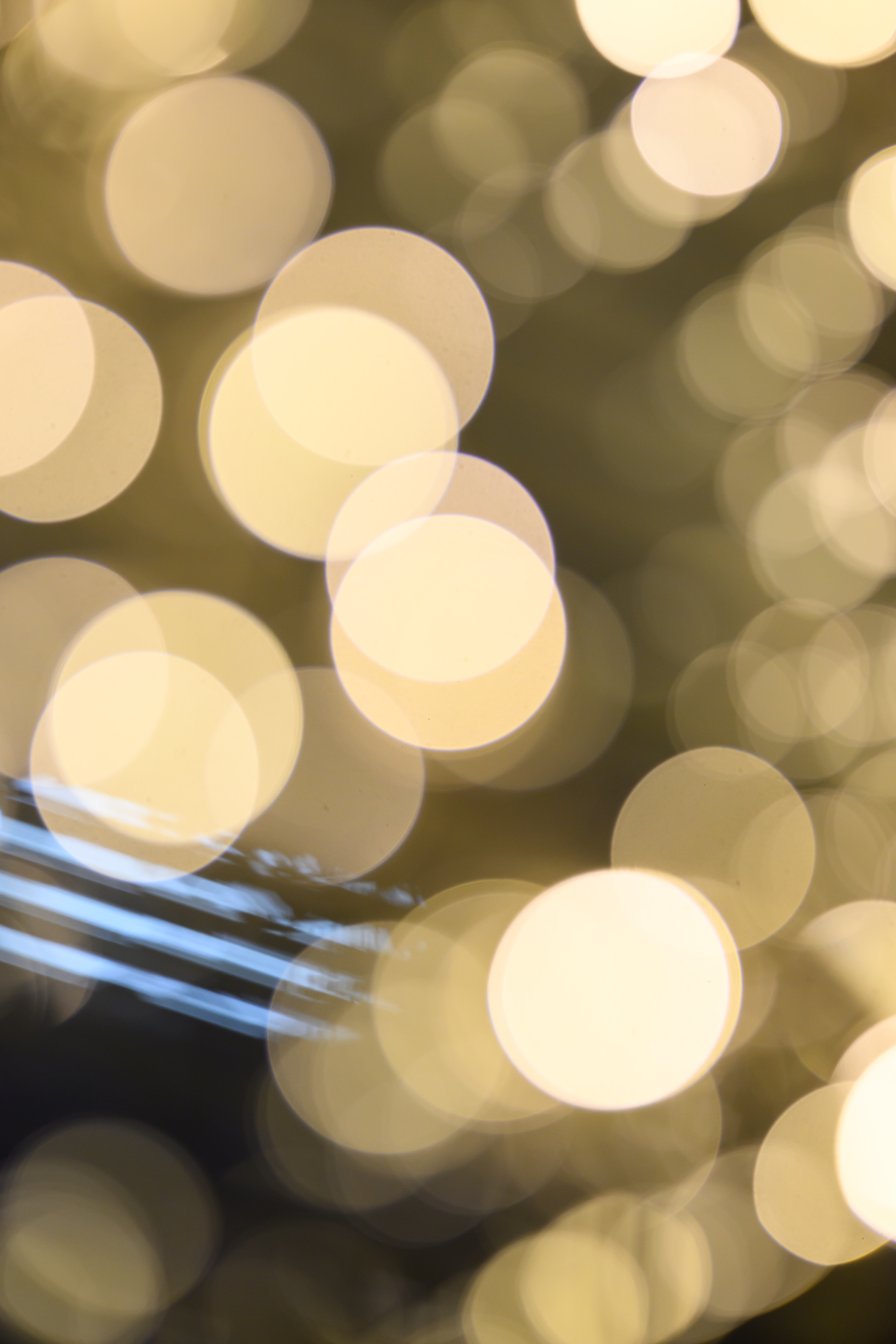
Bokeh at f/1.8

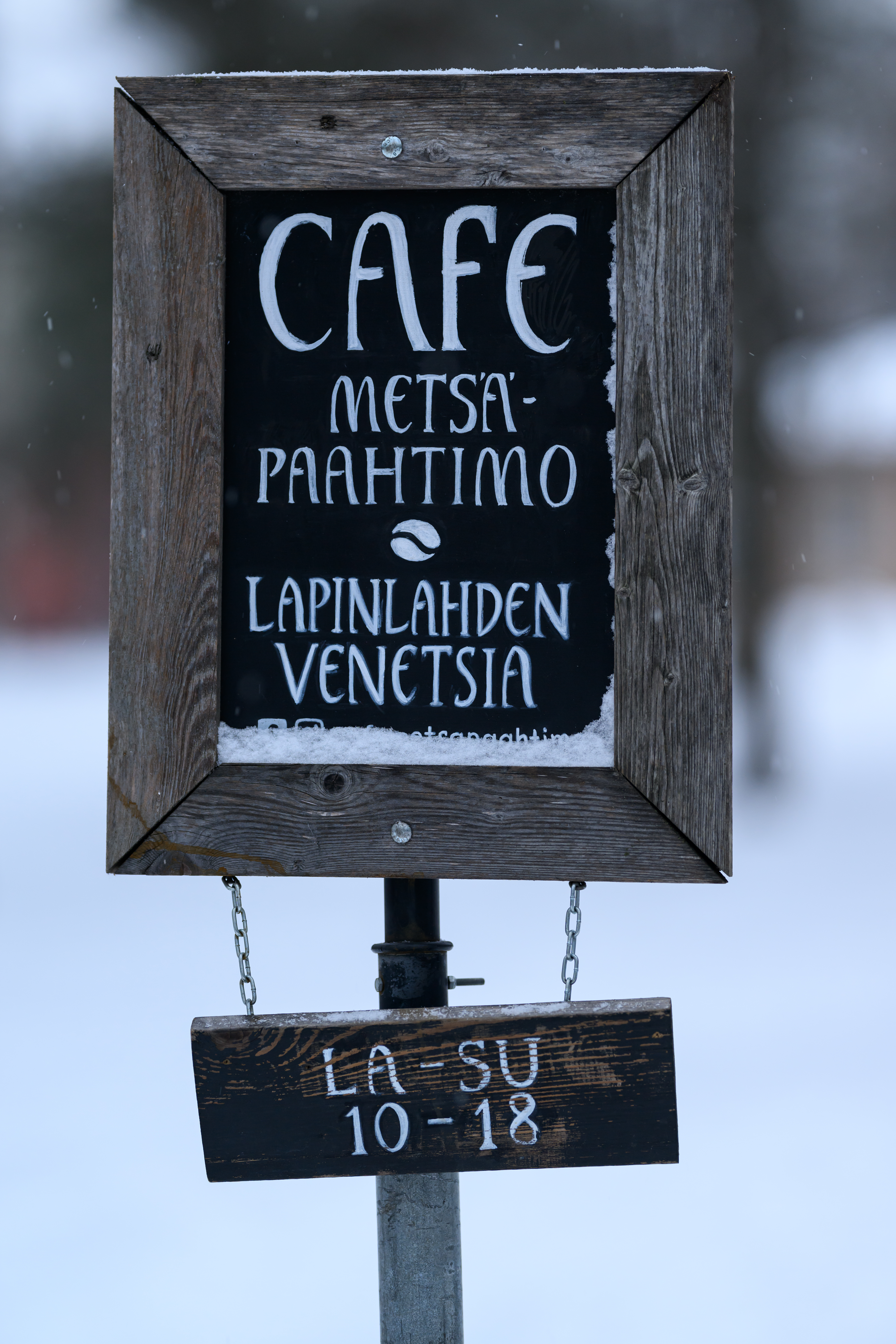
At f/1.8

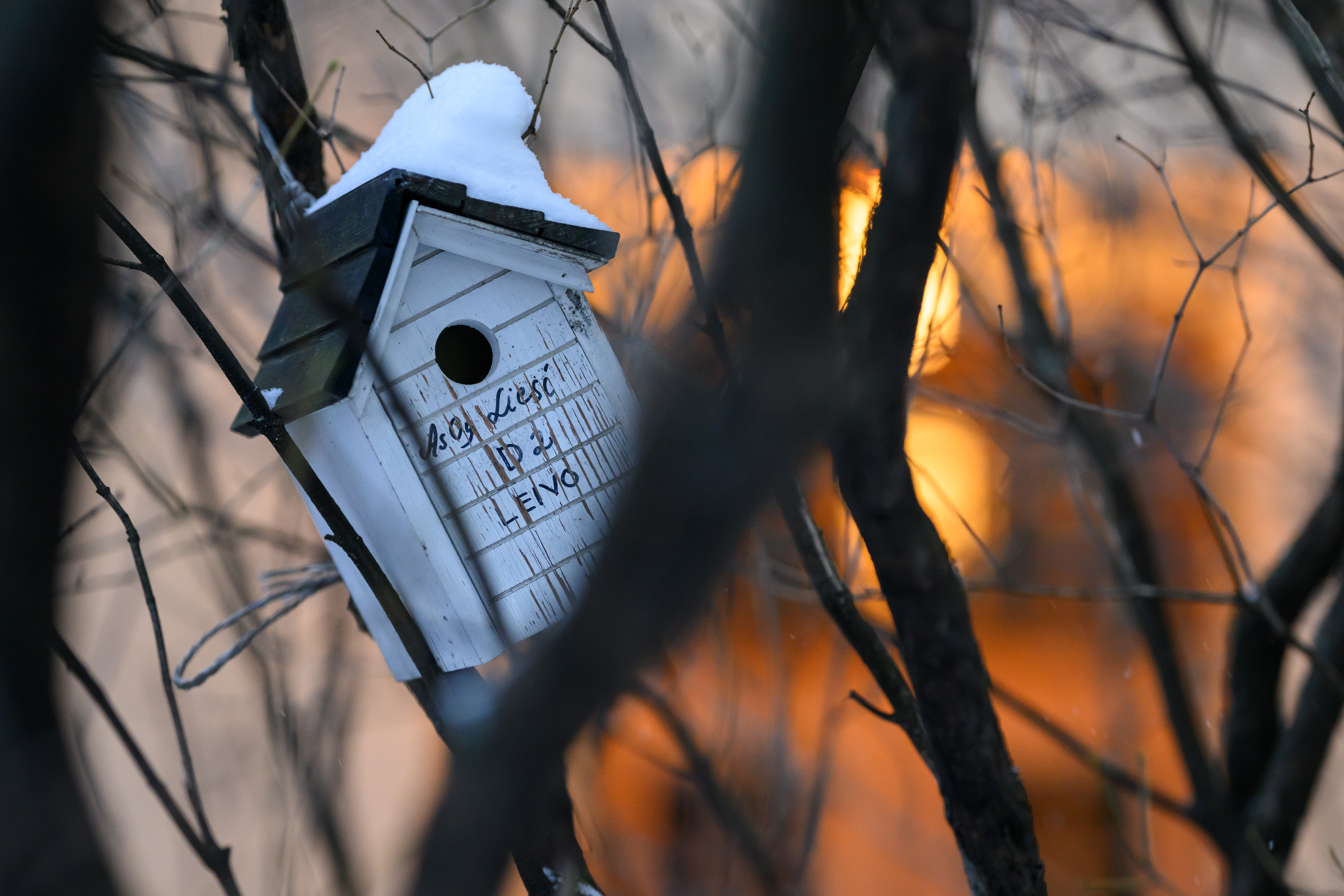
At f/1.8

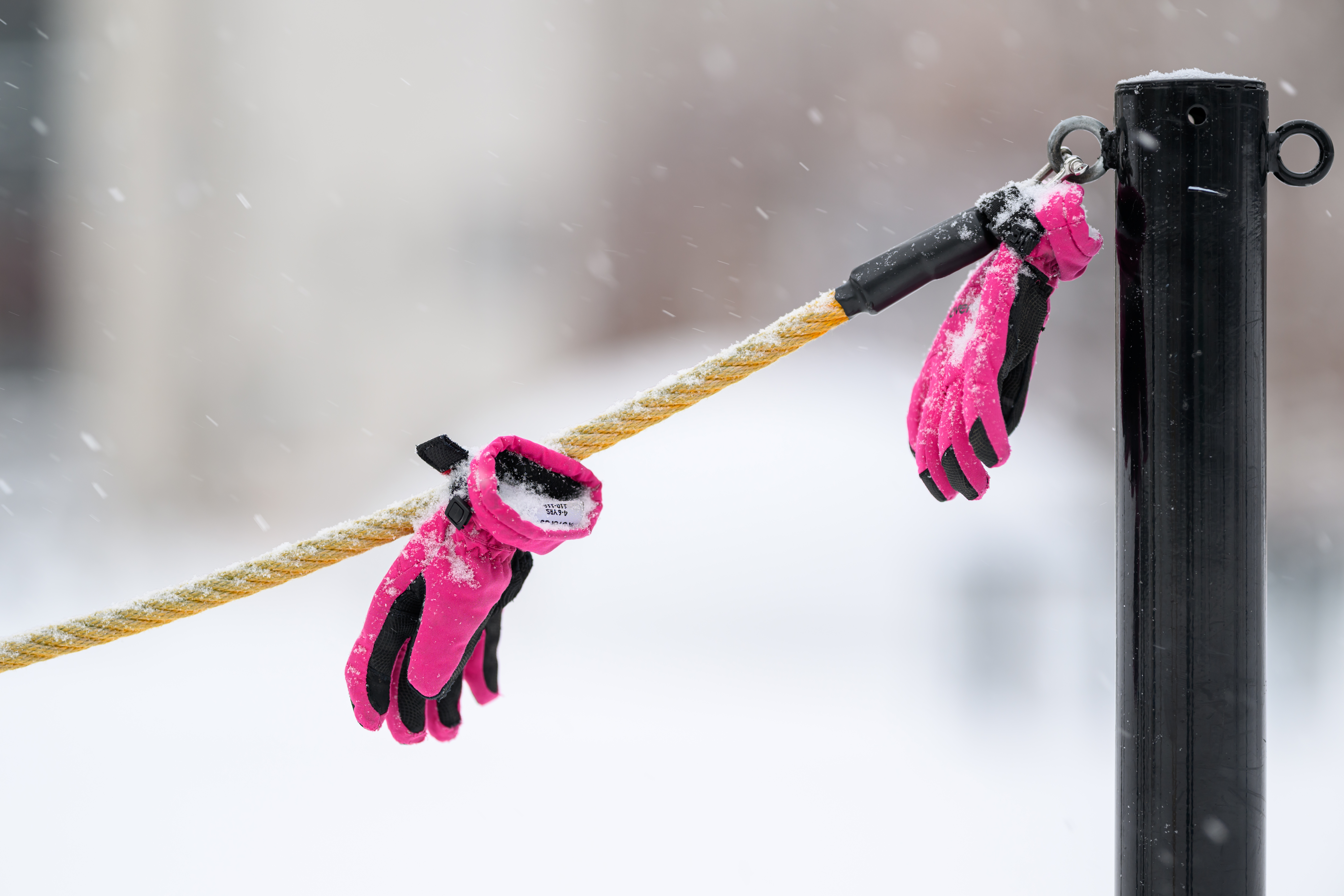
At f/1.8

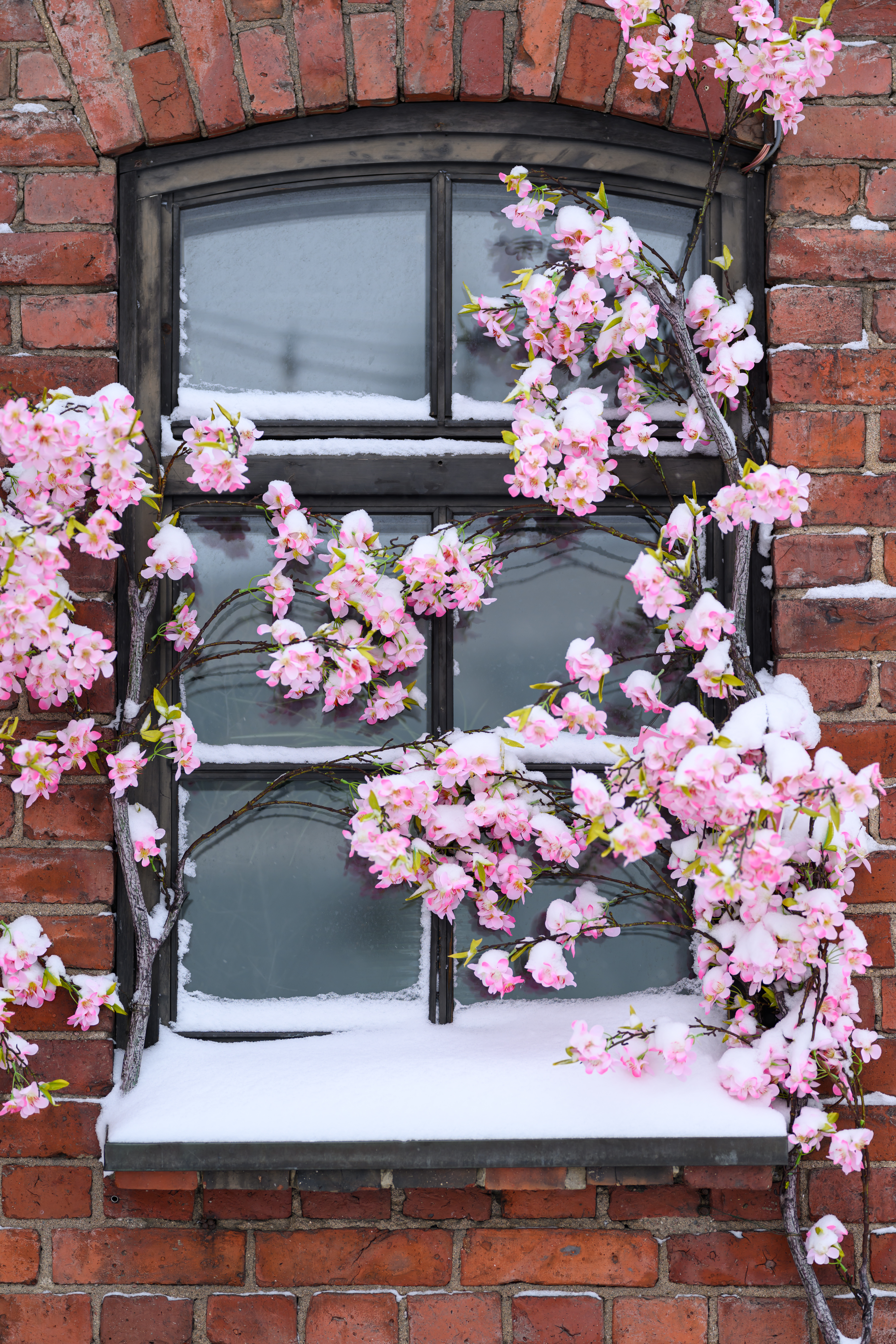
At f/1.8

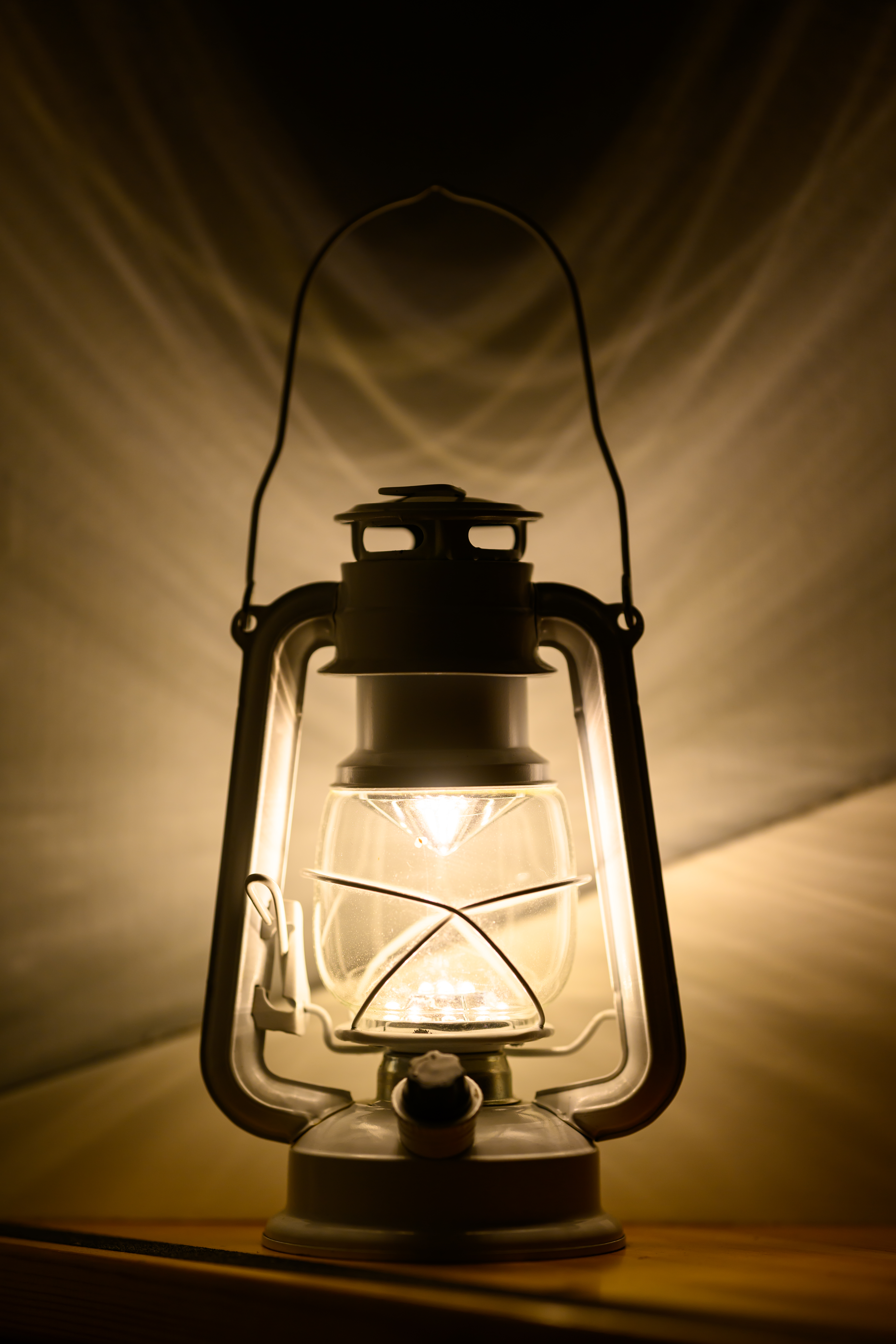
At f/1.8

== See also ==
- Nikon Z-mount
