= Noct =

Noct or NOCT may refer to:

- Noct (camera lens), a series of lenses from Nikon
- Noct (video game)
- Noctis Lucis Caelum, a character in the Final Fantasy video game series
- Nocturnin, encoded by the NOCT gene
- National Olympic Committee of Thailand
