= Nikon Nikkor Z 26 mm f/2.8 =

Nikkor Z 26 mm f/2.8
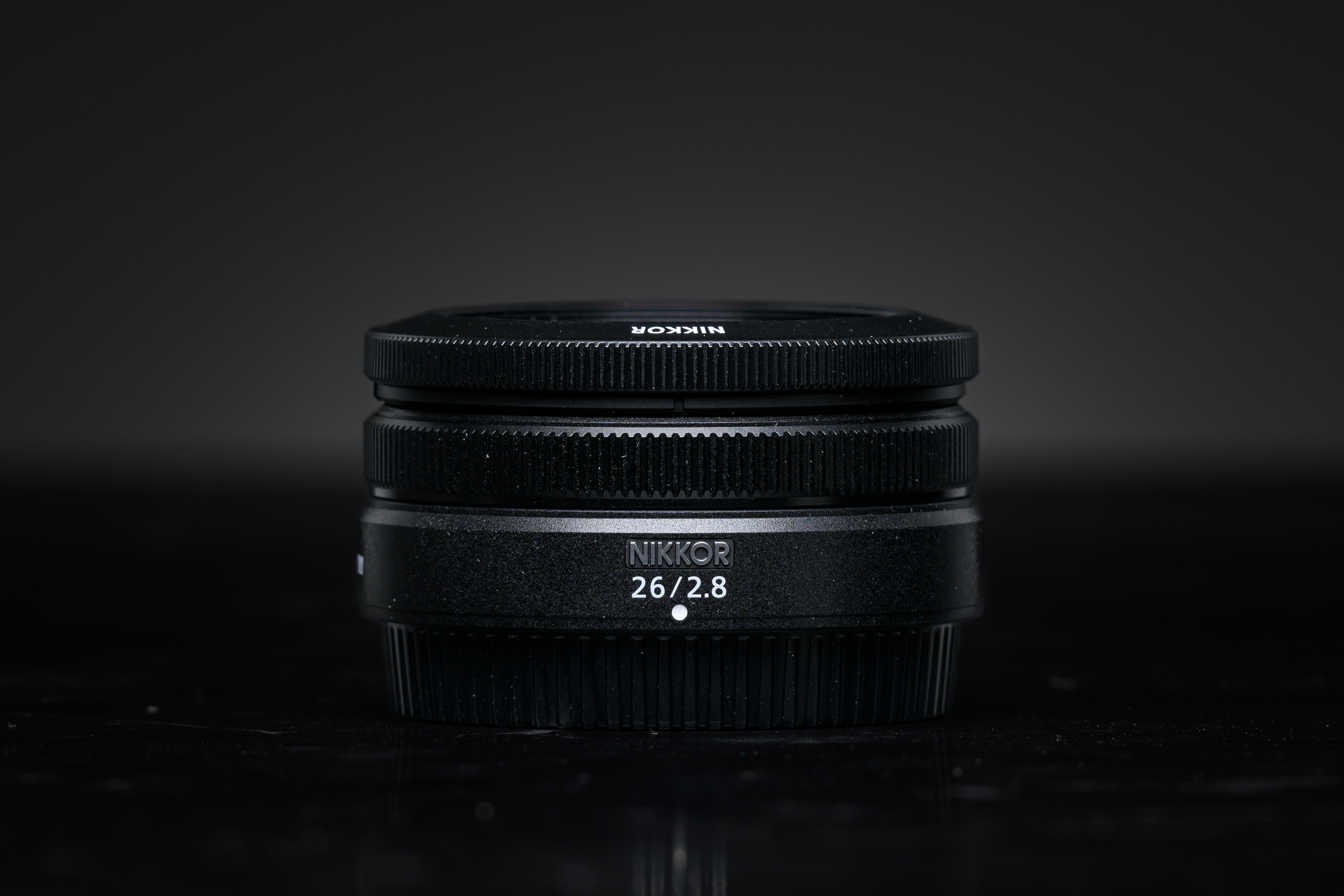
- Maker: Nikon
- Lens mount: Z-mount

Technical data
- Type: Prime
- Focus drive: Stepping motor
- Focal length: 26mm
- Image format: FX (full frame)
- Aperture (max/min): f/2.8–16
- Close focus distance: 0.2m
- Max. magnification: 1:5.3
- Diaphragm blades: 7 (rounded)
- Construction: 8 elements in 6 groups

Features
- Lens-based stabilization: No No
- Macro capable: No No
- Application: Wide-angle Lens

Physical
- Max. length: 23.5 mm
- Diameter: 70 mm
- Weight: 125 g
- Filter diameter: 52 mm (only on hood)

Software
- Lens ID: 40

Accessories
- Lens hood: HB-111 (bayonet)

Angle of view
- Diagonal: 79° (FX); 57° (DX)

History
- Introduction: February 2023

Retail info
- MSRP: 499.95 USD (as of 2023)

The Nikon Nikkor Z 26 mm f/2.8 is a full-frame, wide-angle prime lens manufactured by Nikon for use on Nikon Z-mount mirrorless cameras.

== Introduction ==
On January 5, 2023, Nikon announced the development of the lens. The lens was introduced on February 7, 2023, alongside the Nikkor Z 85 mm f/1.2 S. According to Nikon, at the time of release, the lens was the slimmest autofocus full-frame lens for mirrorless cameras, and at only 125 g, the lightest amongst Nikkor Z lenses. The lens comes with a bayonet-type lens hood (HB-111) and a dedicated slip-on lens cap (LC-K108), which can be attached to both the lens or the lens hood. There is no filter thread on the lens, 52 mm filters can only be mounted on the lens hood.

== Features ==
- 26 mm focal length (approximately equivalent field of view of a 39 mm lens when used on a DX format camera)
- Autofocus using a stepping motor (STM), focus-by-wire manual focus ring
- 8 elements in 6 groups (including 3 aspherical lens elements)
- 7-blade rounded diaphragm
- One customizable control ring (manual focusing by default, aperture, ISO and exposure compensation functions can be assigned to it)

== Awards ==
The lens was awarded with the Japan Institute of Design Promotion Good Design 2023 award and the iF Design Award 2024.

== Sample images ==
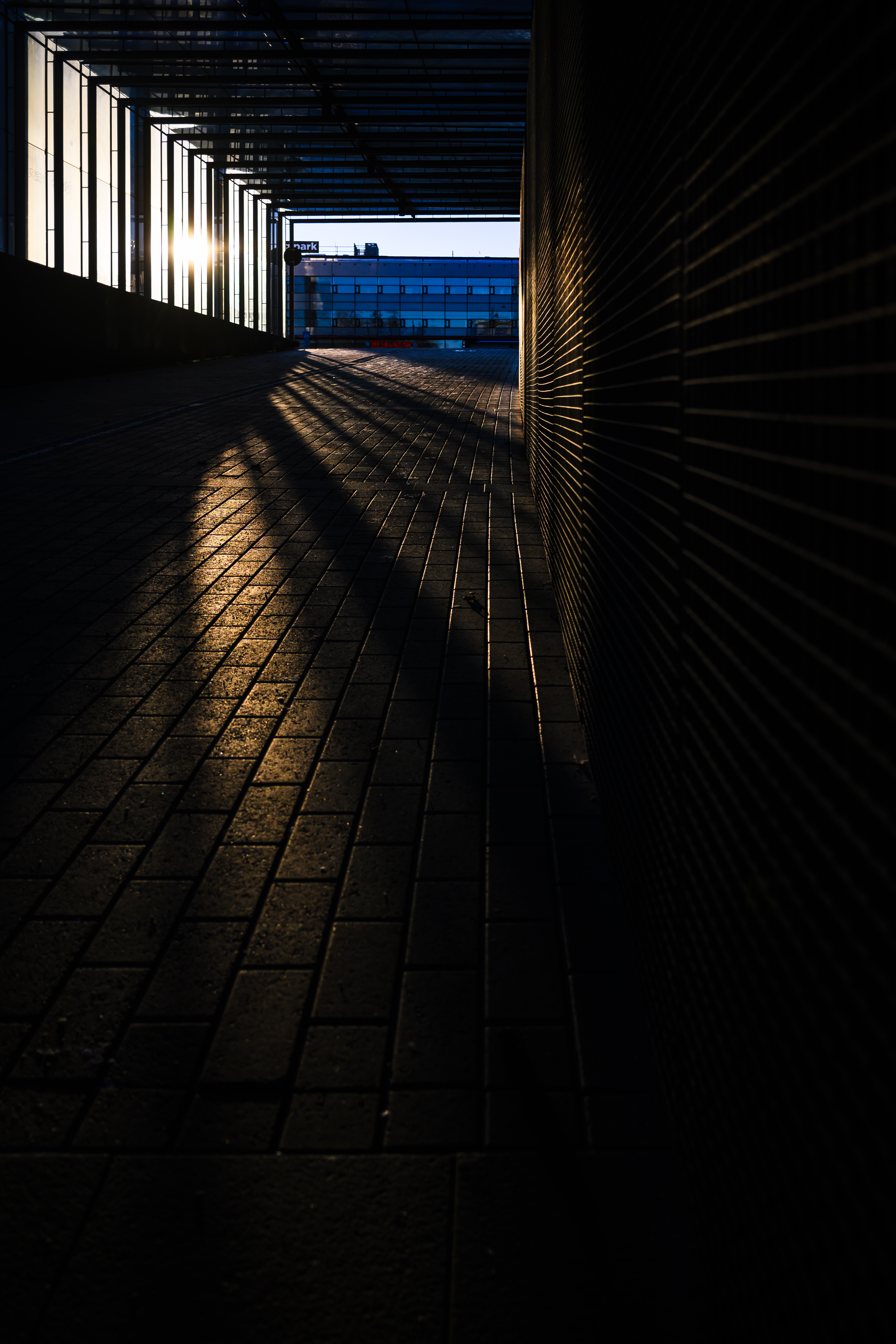
At f/2.8

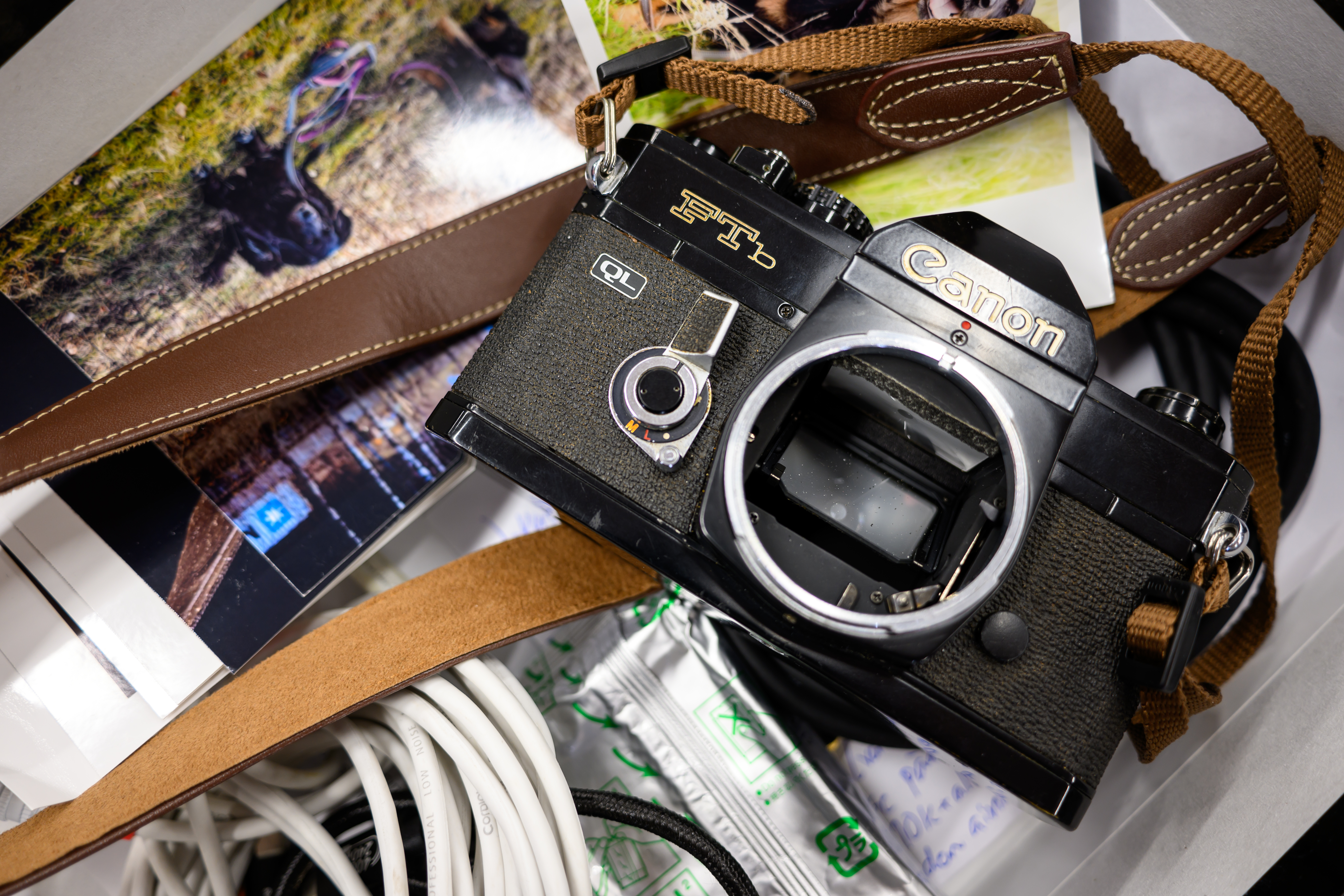
At f/2.8

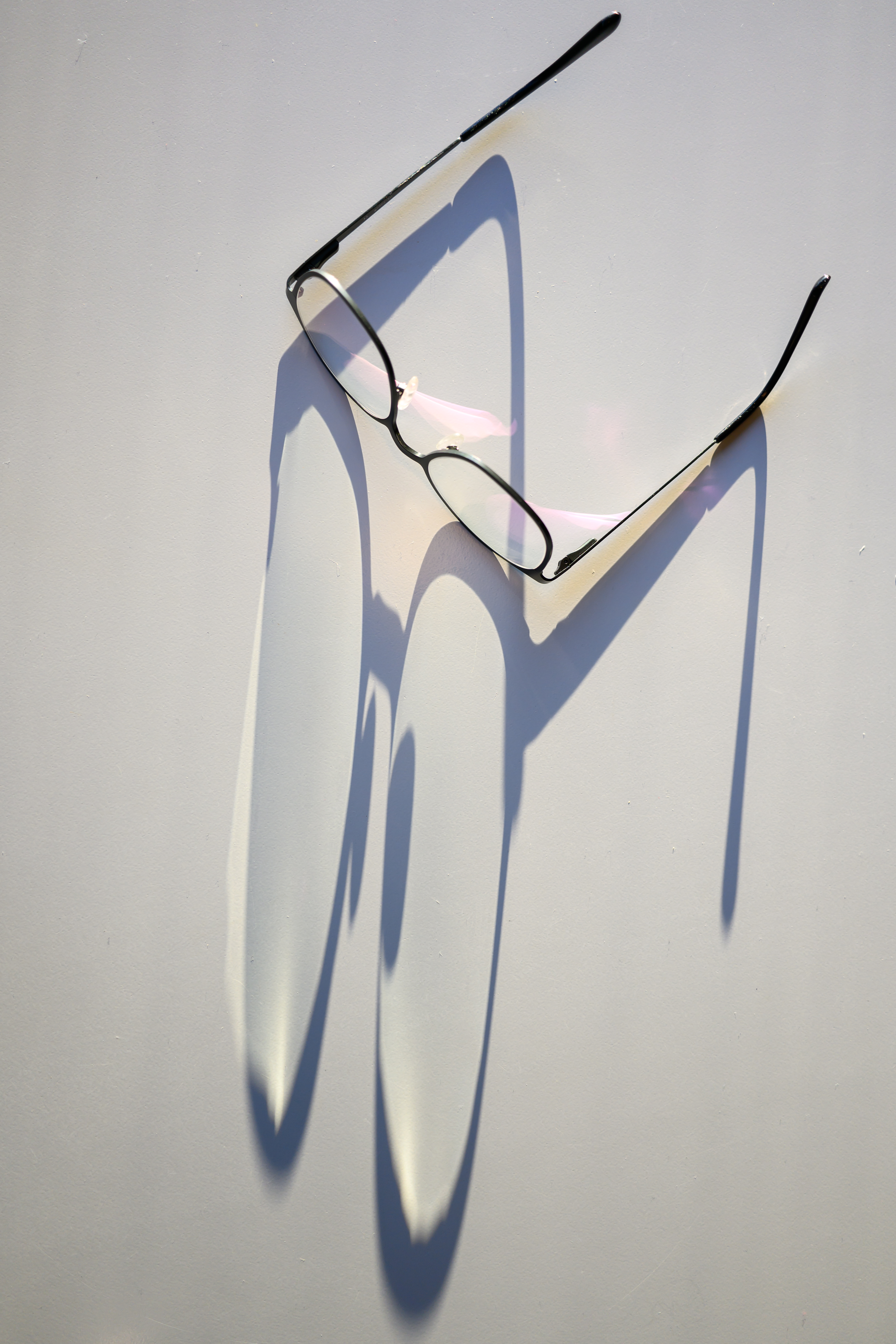
At f/2.8

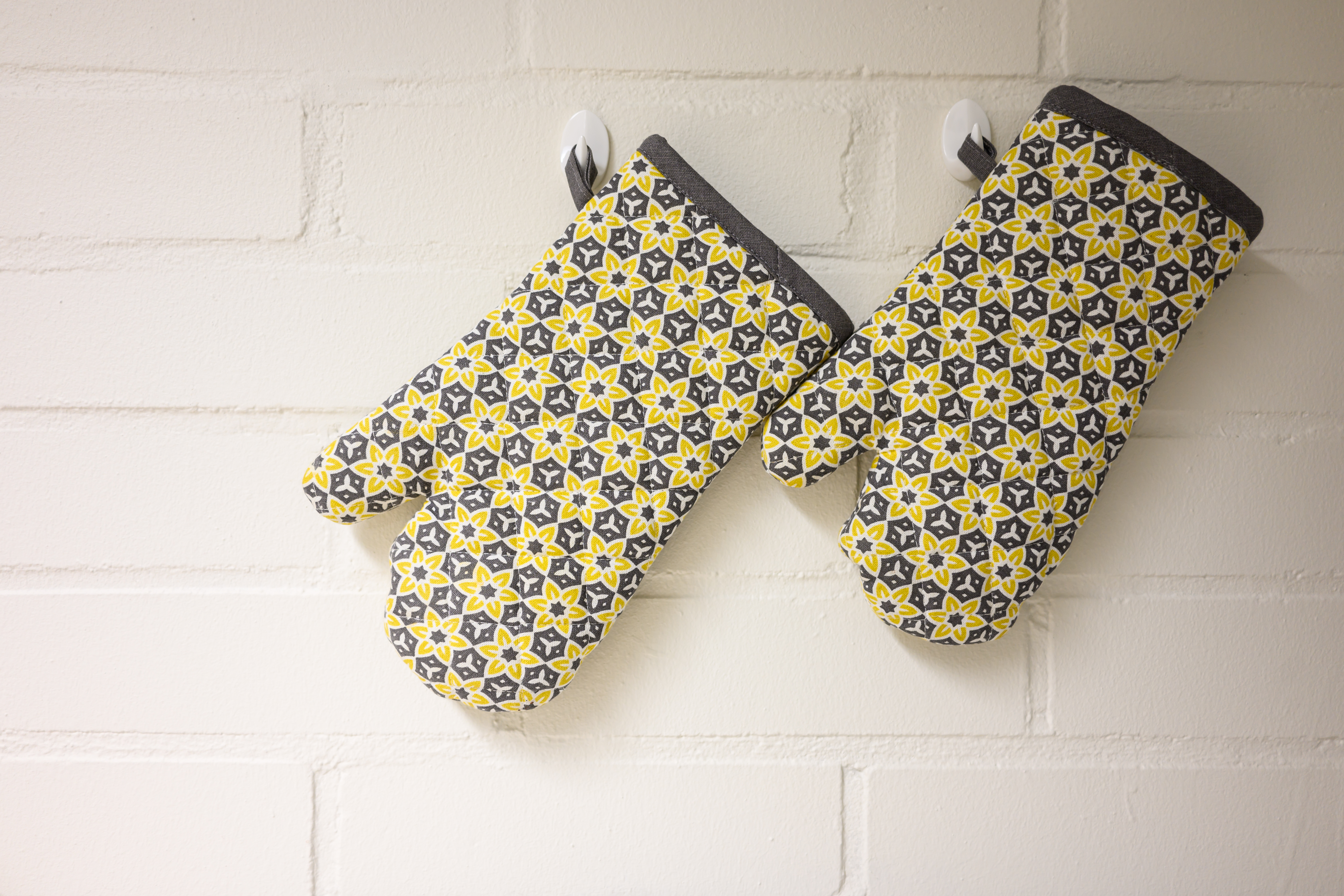
At f/2.8

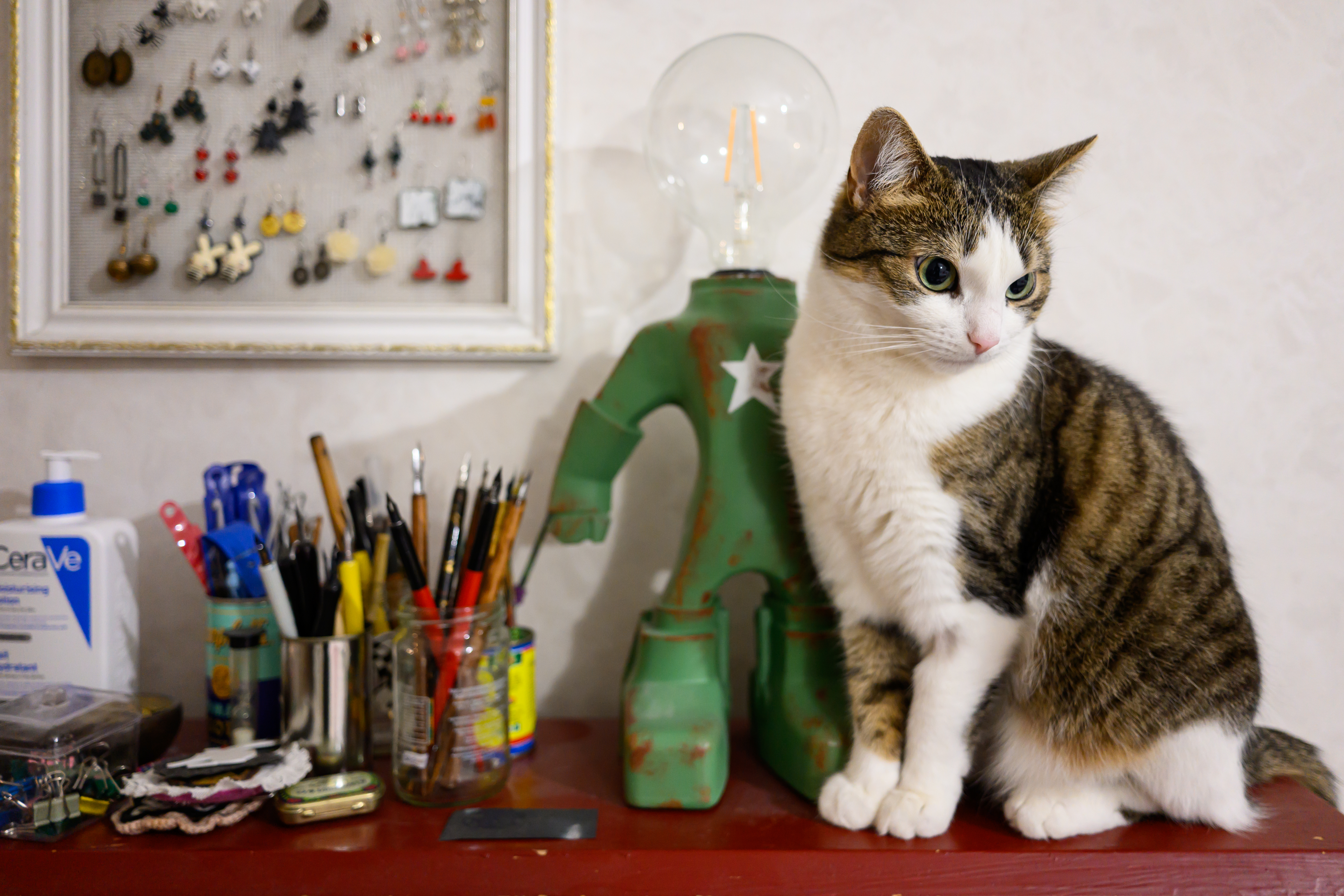
At f/2.8

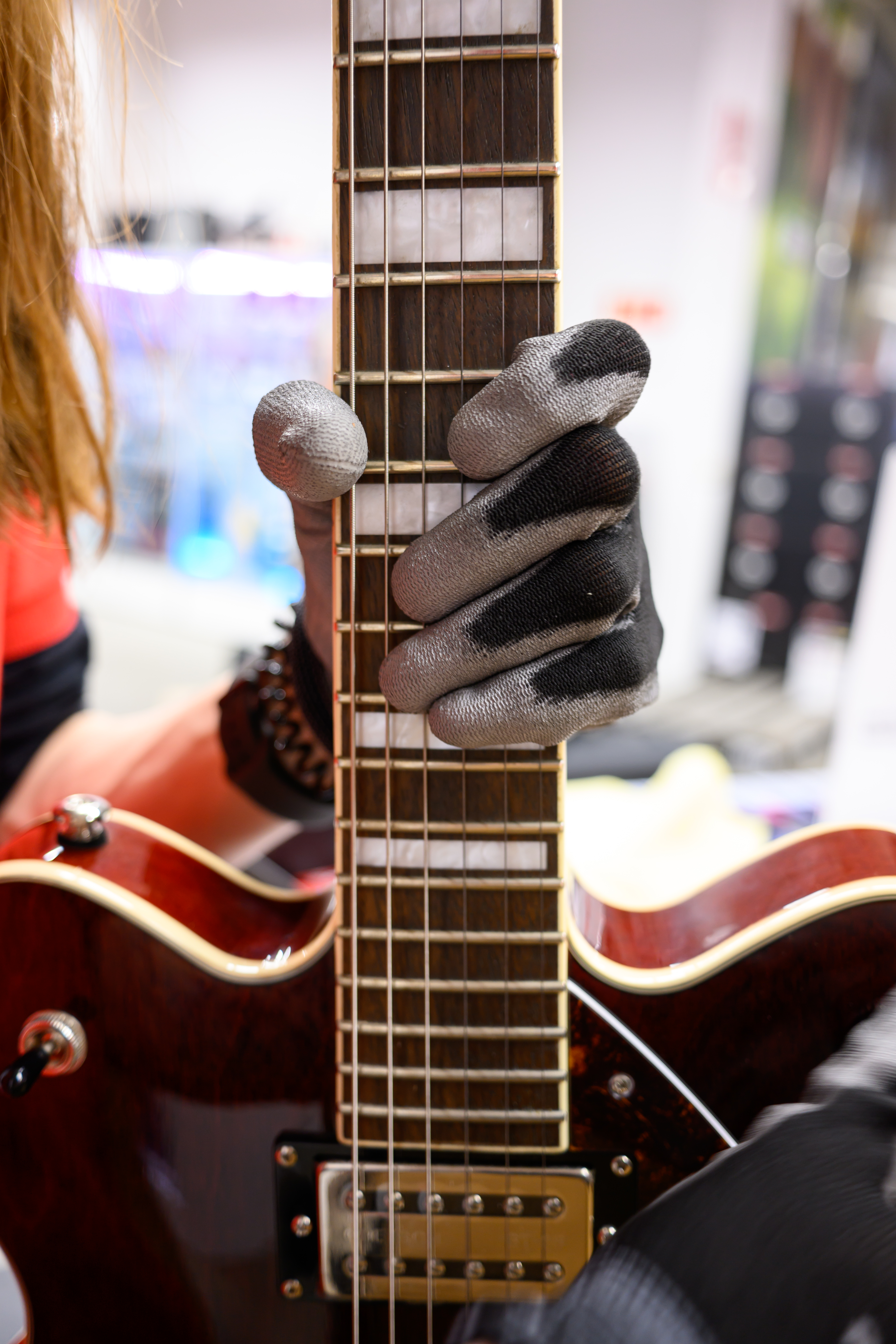
At f/2.8

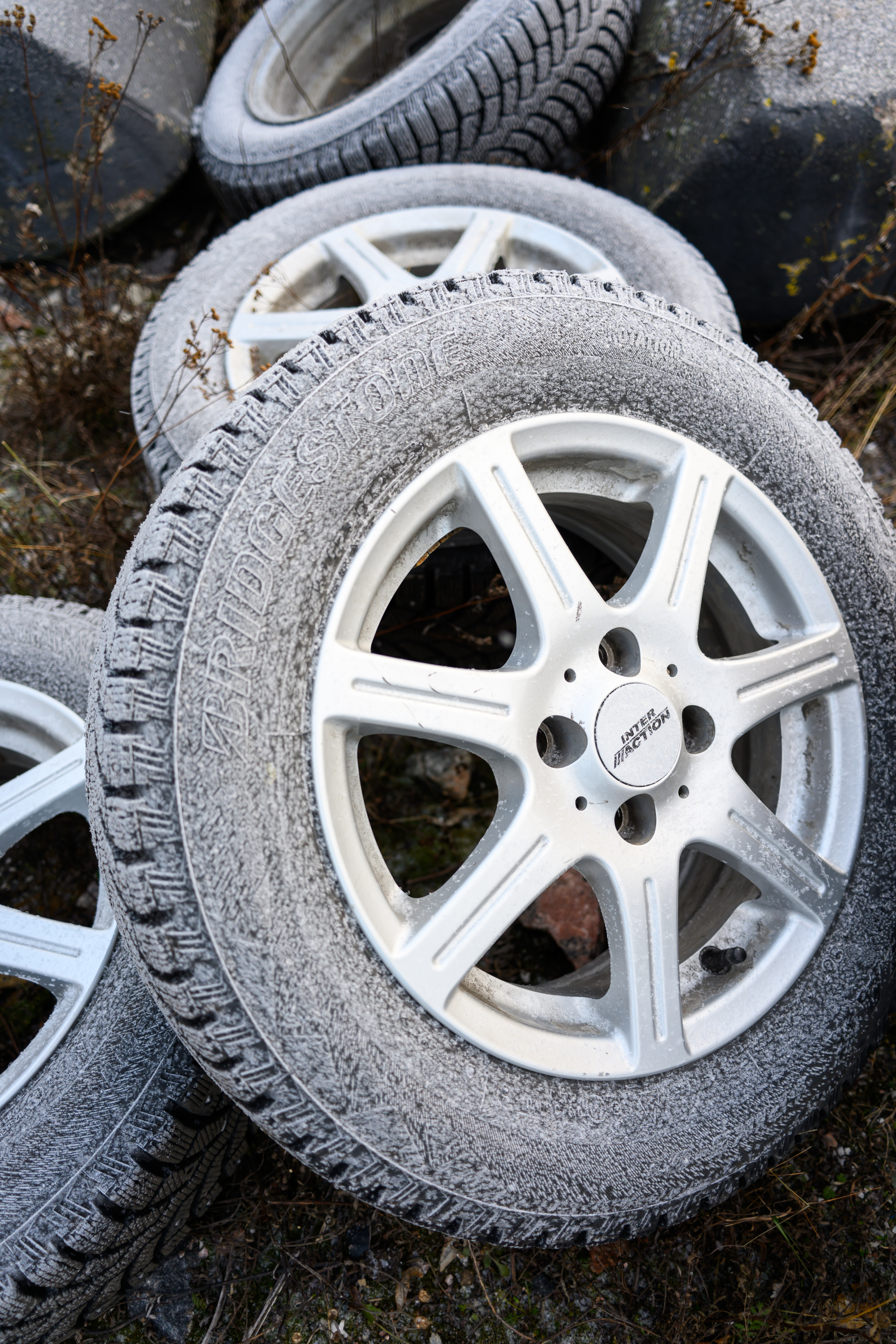
At f/2.8

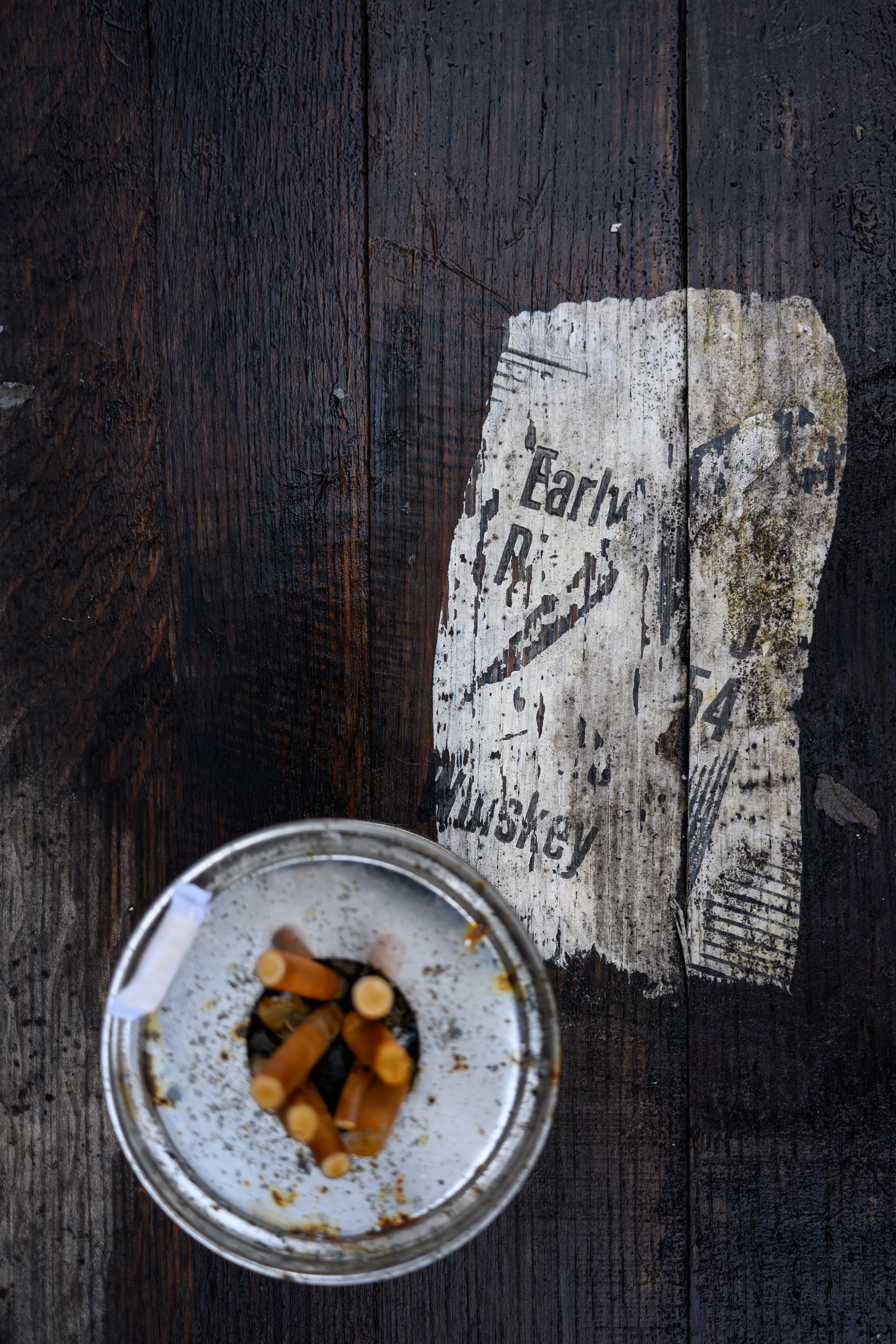
At f/2.8

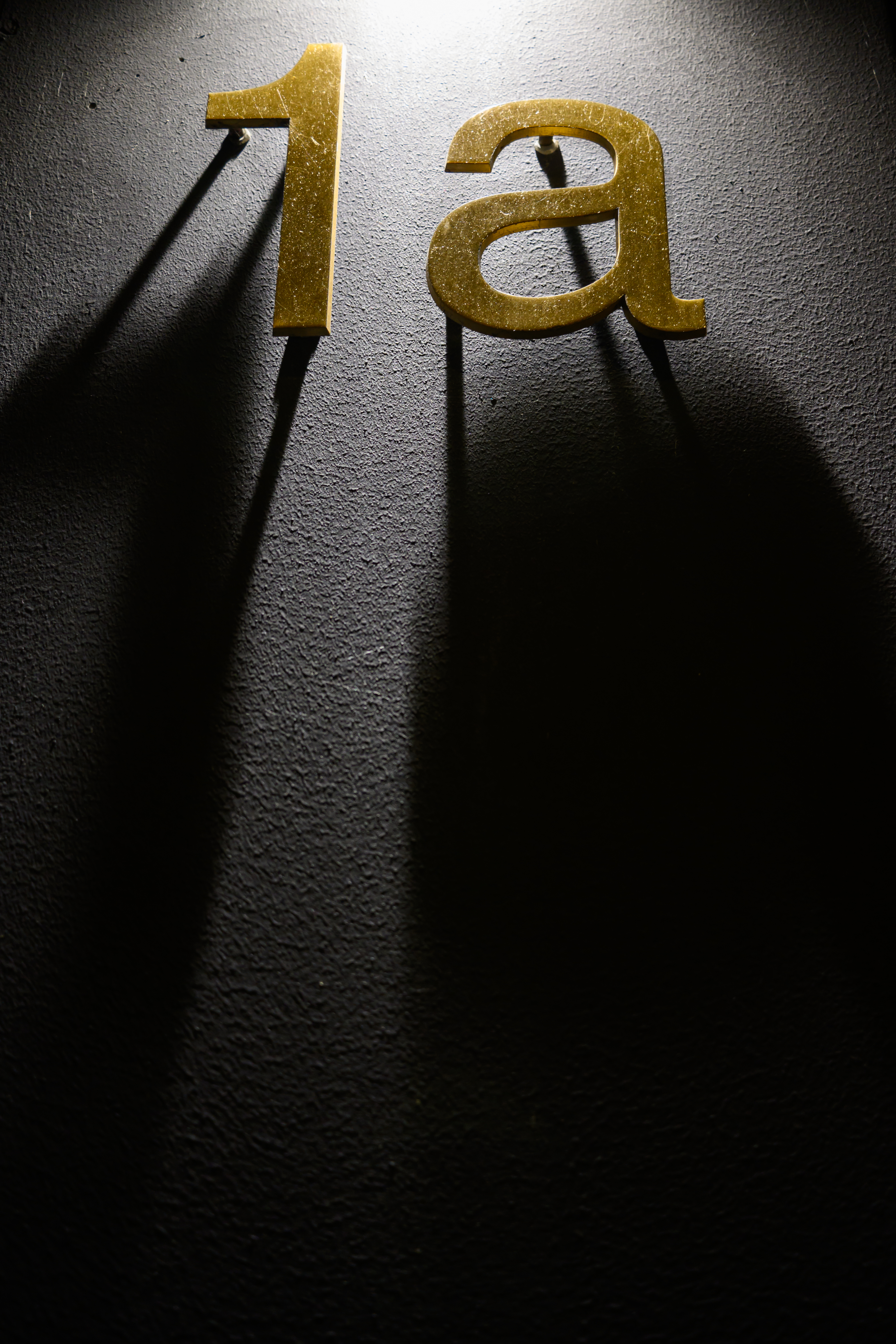
At f/2.8

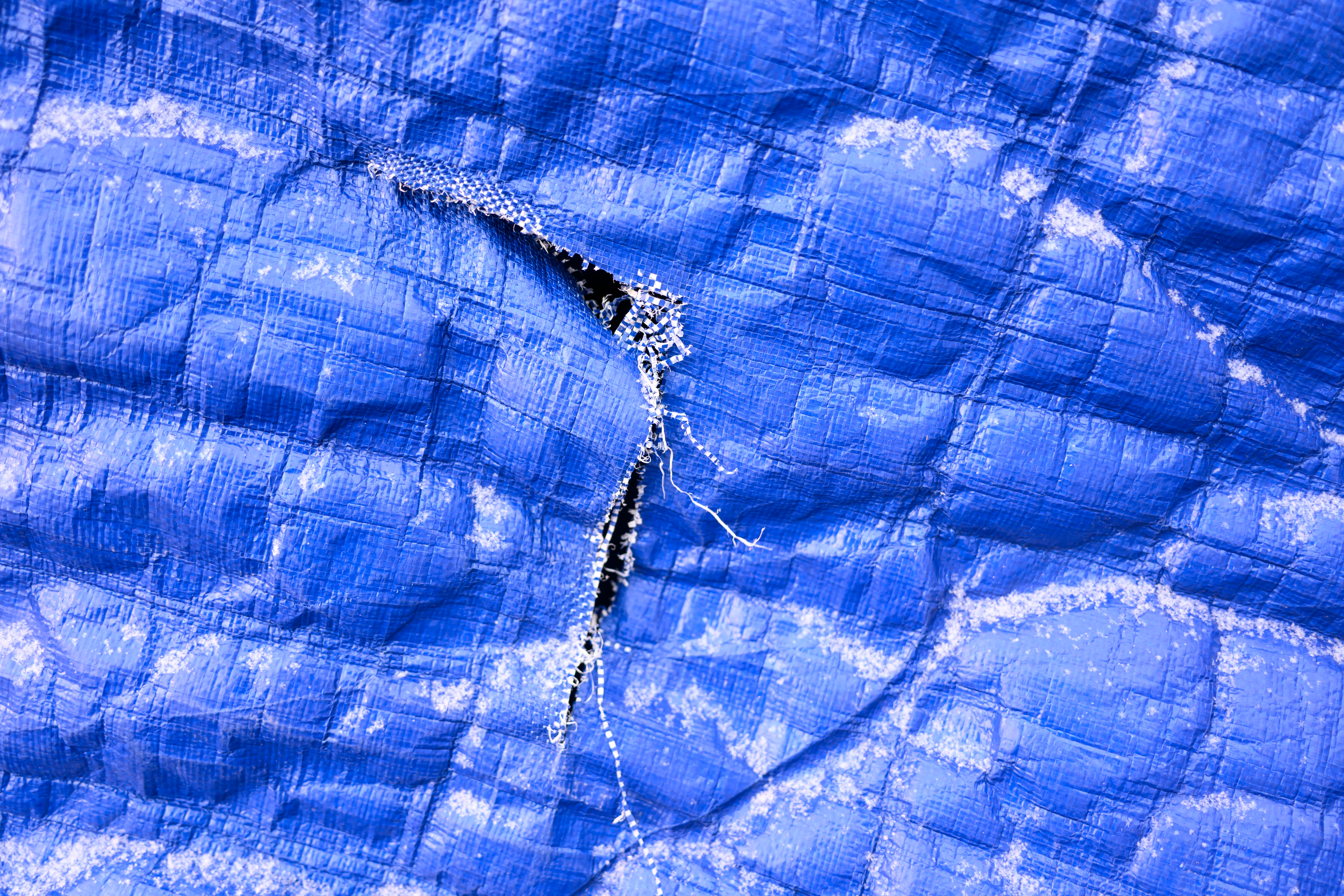
At f/2.8

== See also ==
- Nikon Z-mount
