= Nikon Nikkor Z 85 mm f/1.2 S =

Nikkor Z 85 mm f/1.2 S
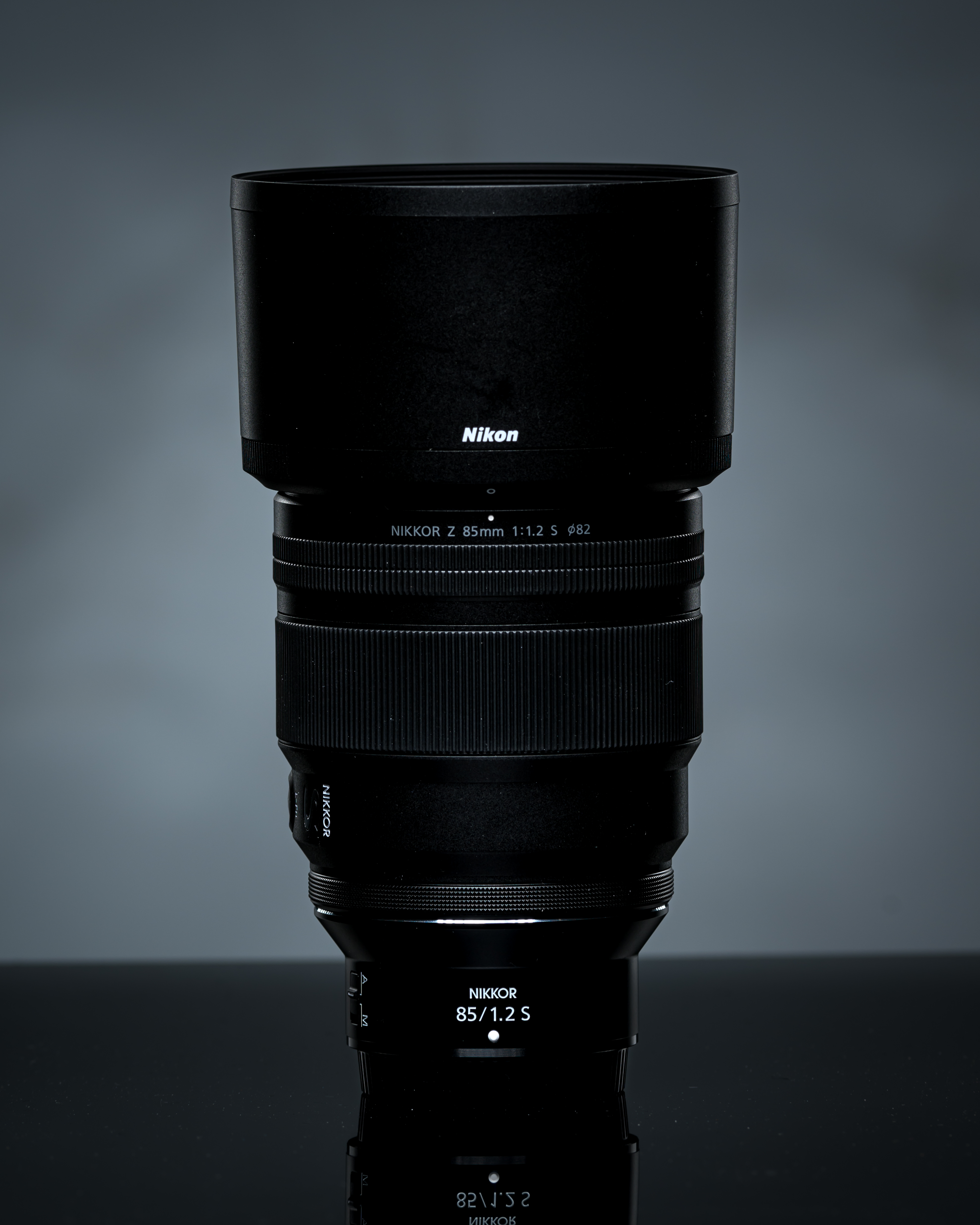
- Maker: Nikon
- Lens mount: Z-mount

Technical data
- Type: Prime
- Focus drive: Stepping motors
- Focal length: 85mm
- Image format: FX (full frame)
- Aperture (max/min): f/1.2–16
- Close focus distance: 0.85m
- Max. magnification: 1:9.1
- Diaphragm blades: 11 (rounded)
- Construction: 15 elements in 10 groups

Features
- Lens-based stabilization: No No
- Macro capable: No No
- Unique features: S-Line lens Nano Crystal Coat elements
- Application: Portrait

Physical
- Max. length: 141.5 mm
- Diameter: 102.5 mm
- Weight: 1160 g
- Filter diameter: 82 mm

Software
- Lens ID: 38

Accessories
- Lens hood: HB-106 (bayonet)
- Case: CL-C2

Angle of view
- Diagonal: 28°30' (FX); 18°50' (DX)

History
- Introduction: February 2023

Retail info
- MSRP: 2799.95 USD (as of 2023)

The Nikon Nikkor Z 85 mm f/1.2 S is a full-frame short-telephoto prime lens manufactured by Nikon for use on Nikon Z-mount mirrorless cameras.

== Introduction ==
On January 5, 2023, Nikon announced the development of the lens (besides the development of Nikkor Z 26 mm f/2.8 as well). This lens was released on February 7, 2023. The lens comes with a bayonet-type lens hood (HB-106).

The lens achieved a DXOMark score of 55, the highest score among all tested lenses as of December 2024 (on par with the Nikkor Z 58 mm f/0.95 S Noct and Sigma 50 mm f/1.4 DG DN Art for Sony E-mount).

== Features ==
- 85 mm focal length (approximately equivalent field of view of a 127.5 mm lens when used on a DX format camera)
- S-Line lens
- Autofocus using dual stepping motors (STM), dedicated focus-by-wire manual focus ring
- 15 elements in 10 groups (including 1 ED glass and 2 aspherical lens elements and Nano Crystal Coat elements)
- 11-blade rounded diaphragm
- Internal focusing (IF lens)
- One customizable control ring at the back (aperture, ISO and exposure compensation functions can be assigned to it)
- One customizable function button (L-Fn)
- A/M switch for autofocus/manual focus modes

== Awards ==
The lens was awarded with the TIPA World Awards 2023 in category Best Portrait Lens, the EISA Portrait Lens 2023-2024 award and the Japan Institute of Design Promotion Good Design 2023 award.

== Sample images ==
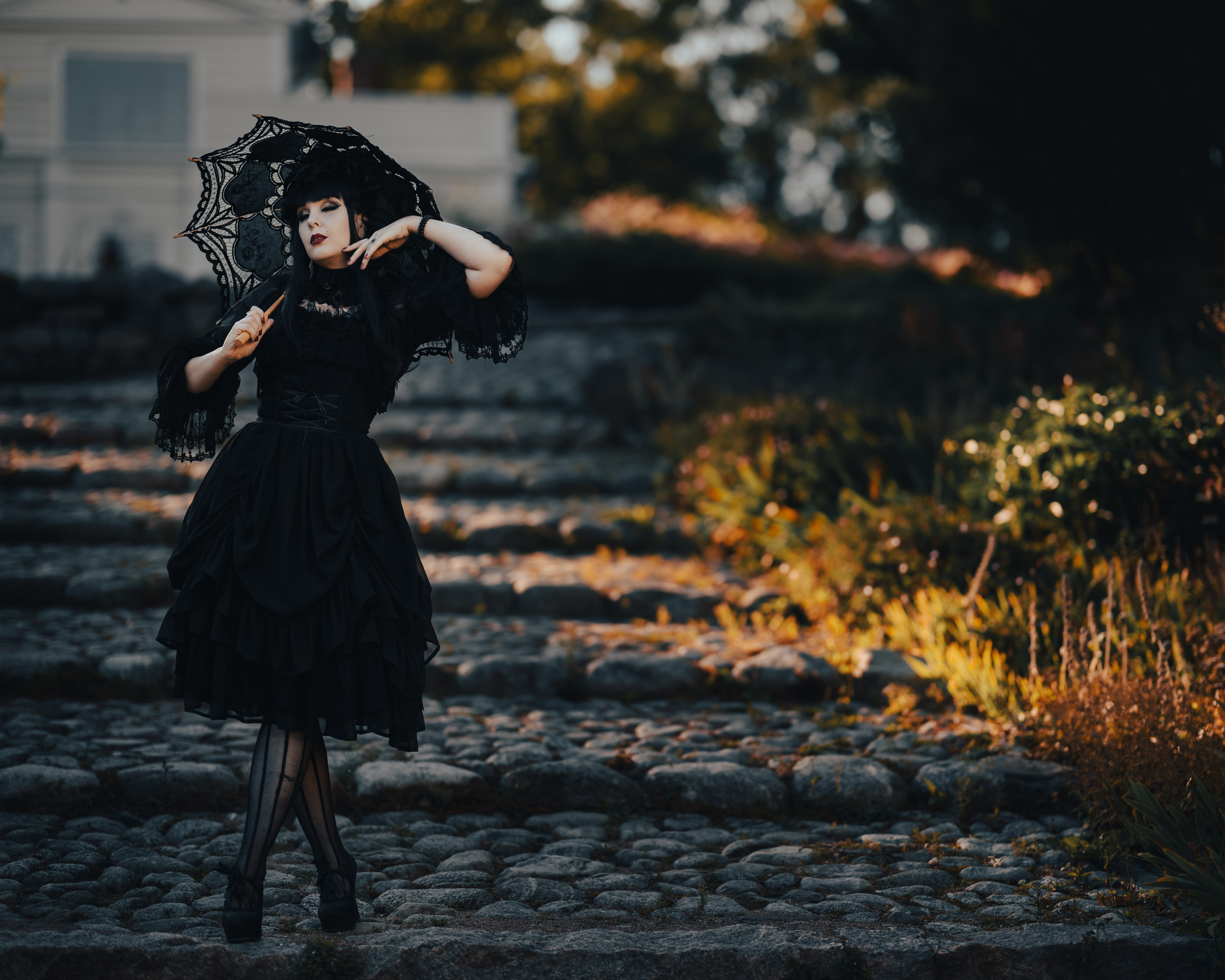
At f/1.2

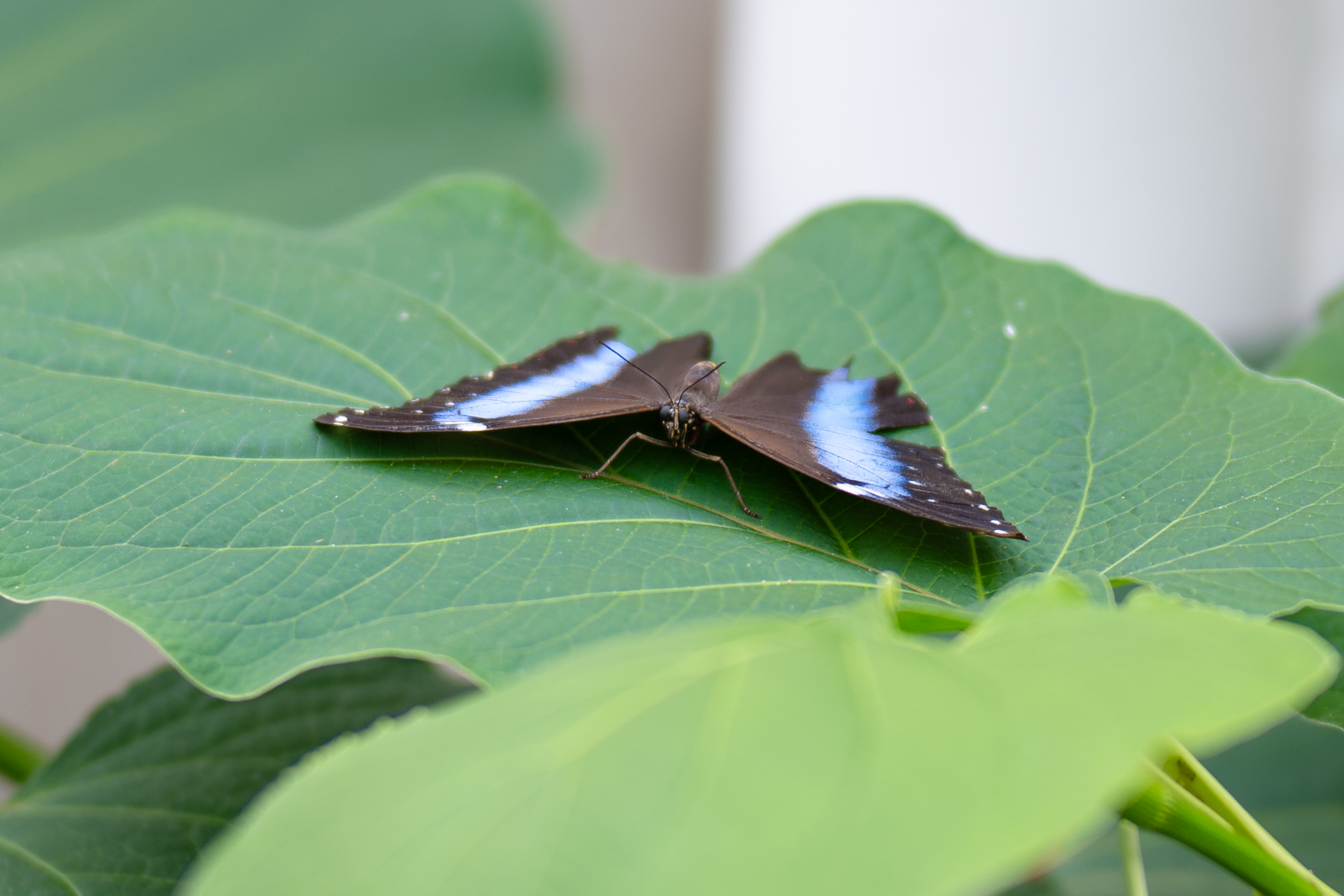
At f/1.2

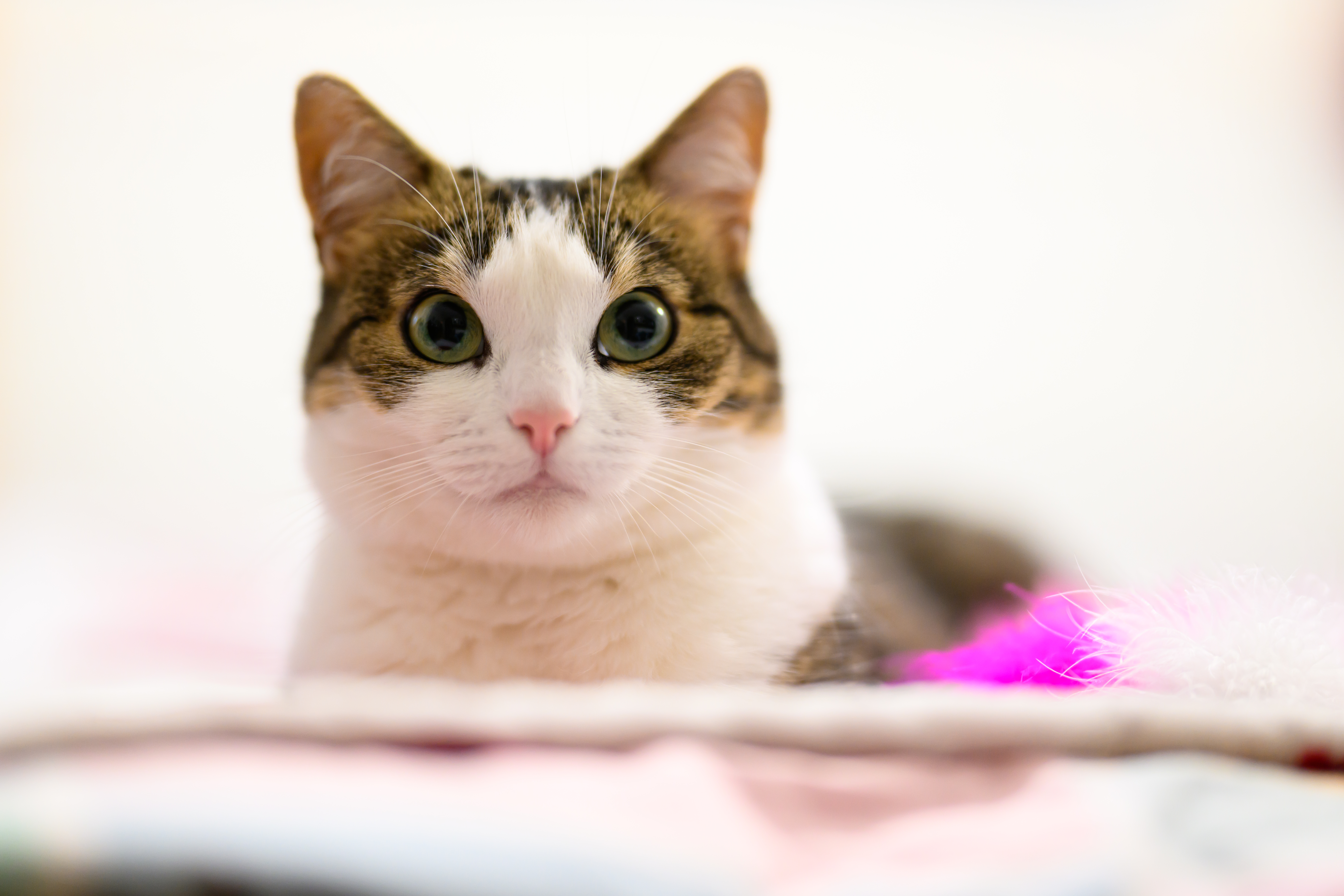
At f/1.2

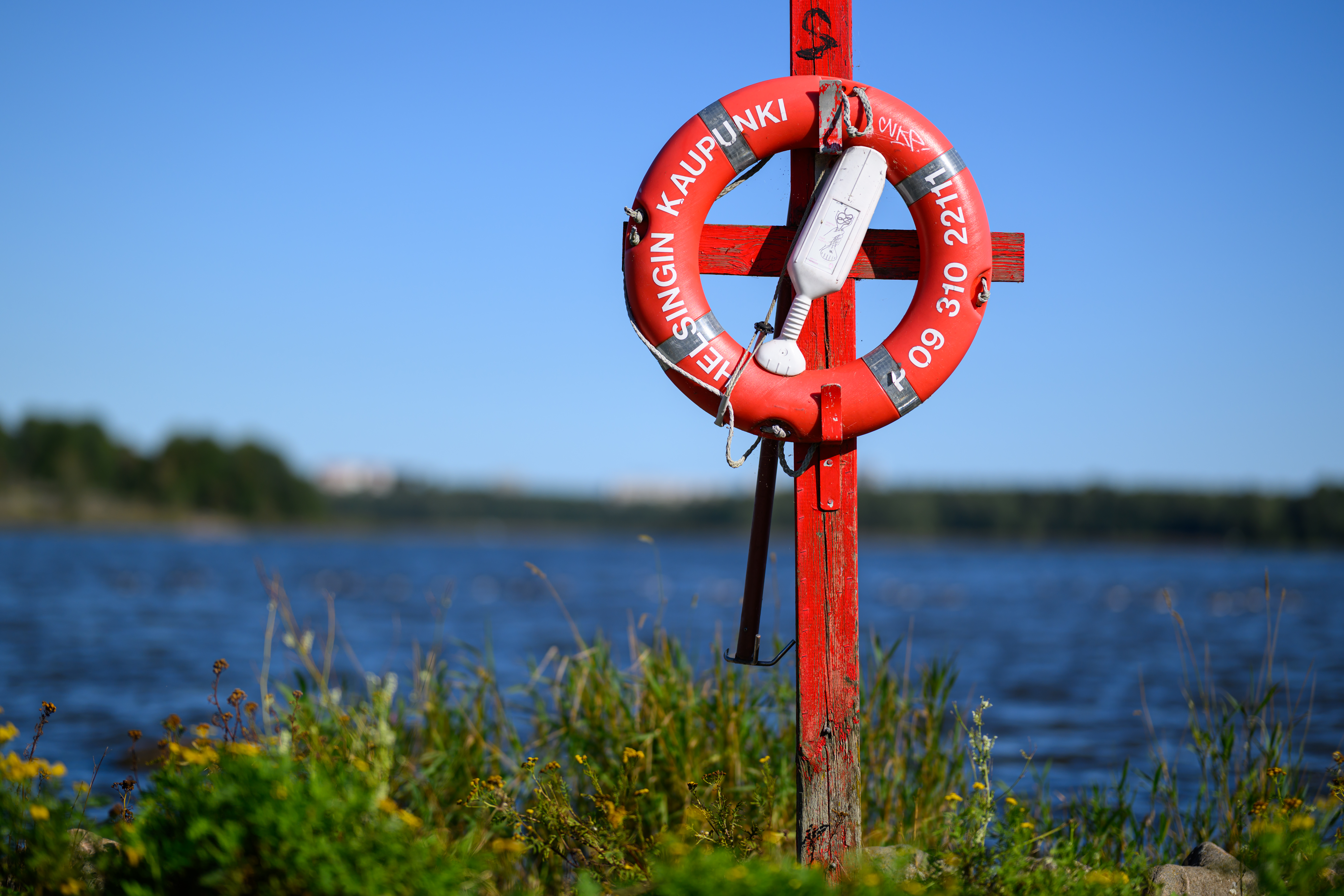
At f/1.2

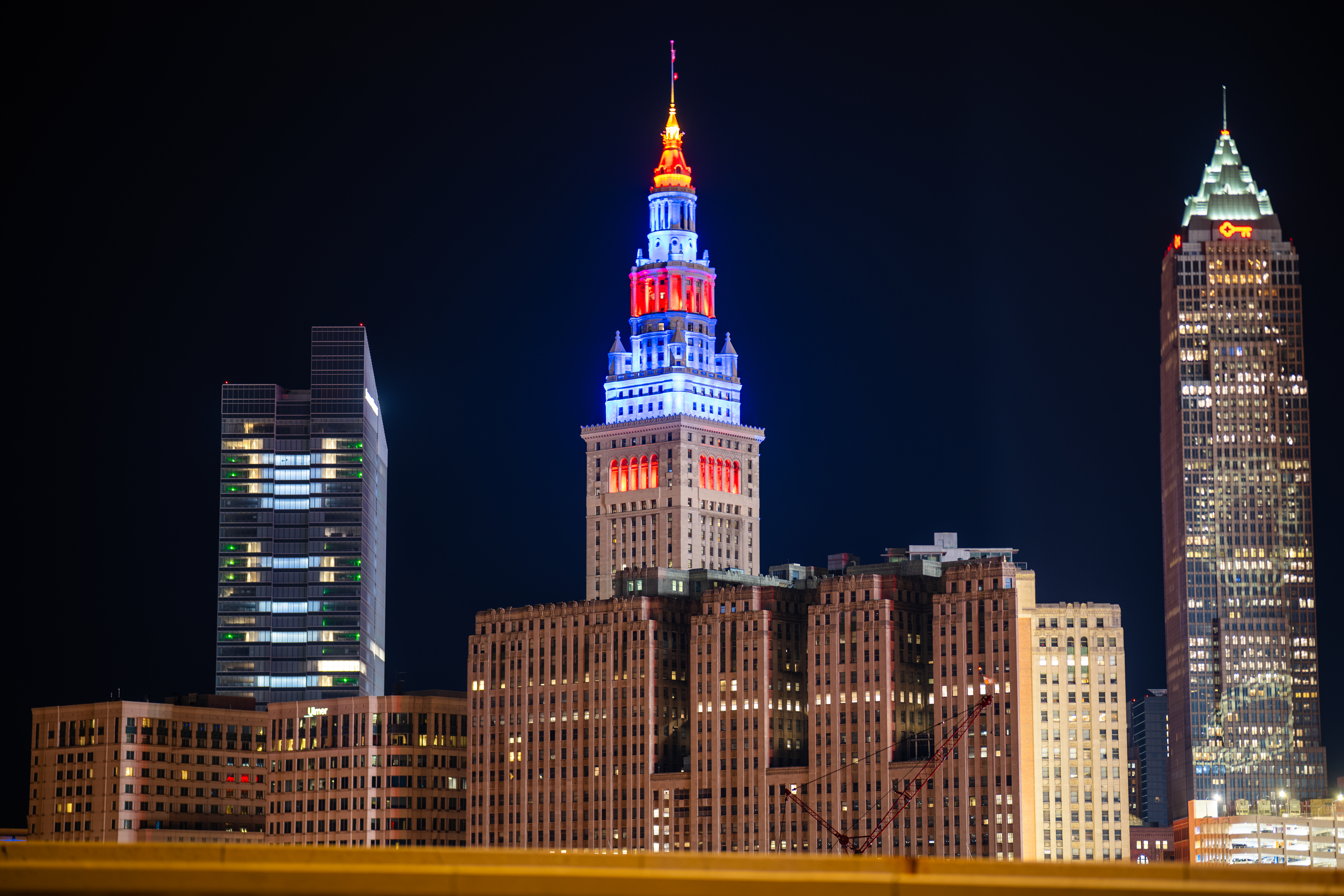
At f/1.2

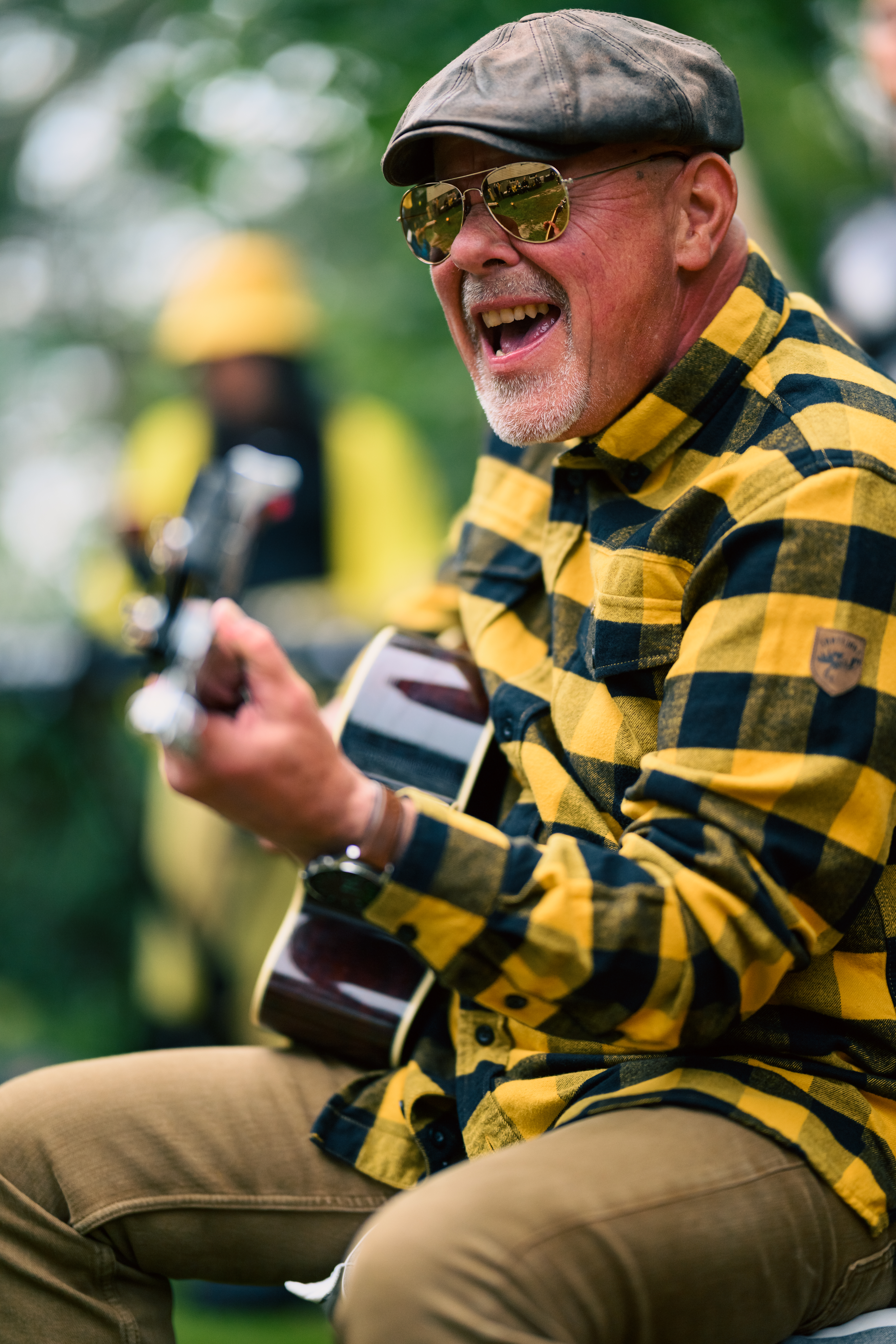
At f/1.2

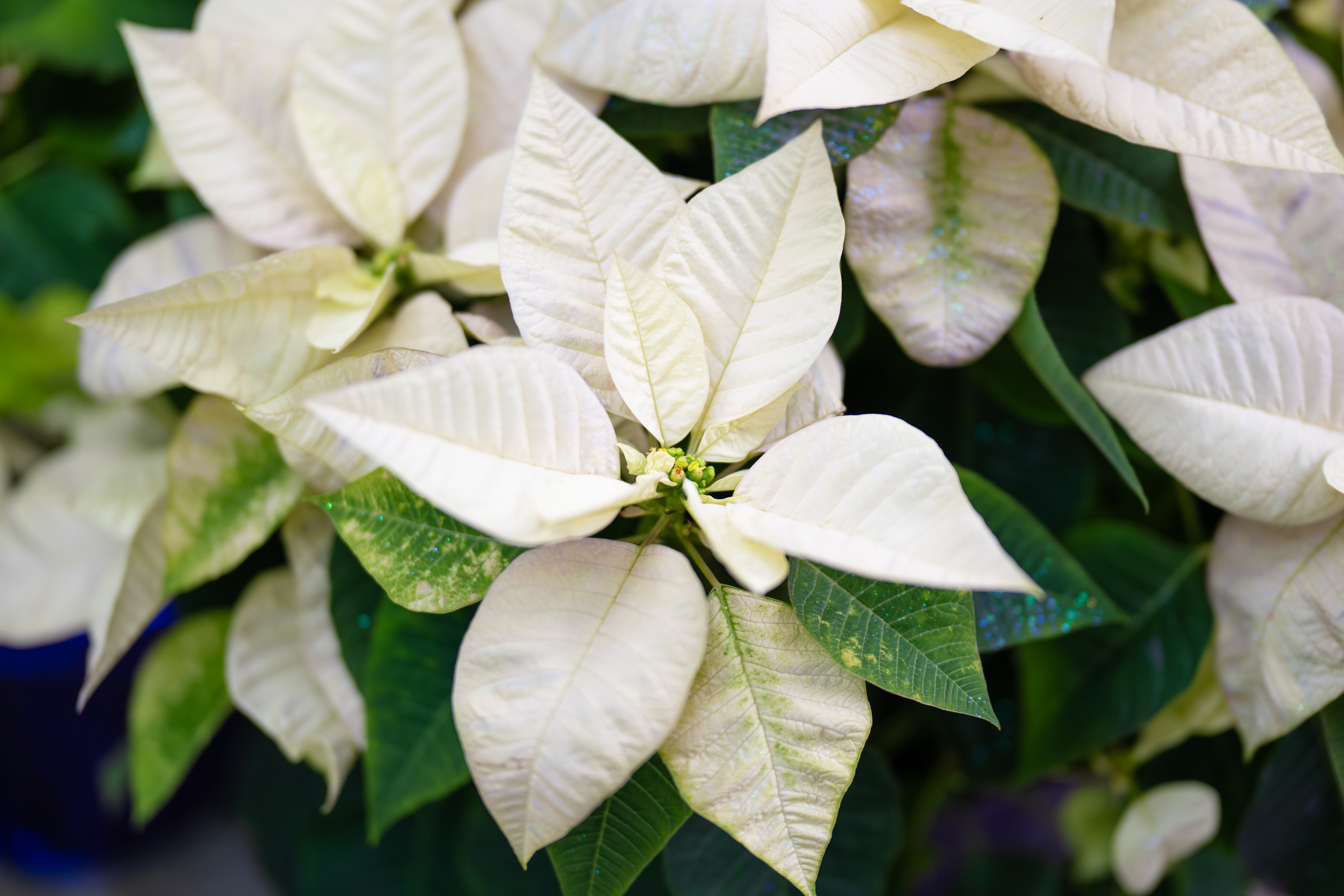
At f/1.2

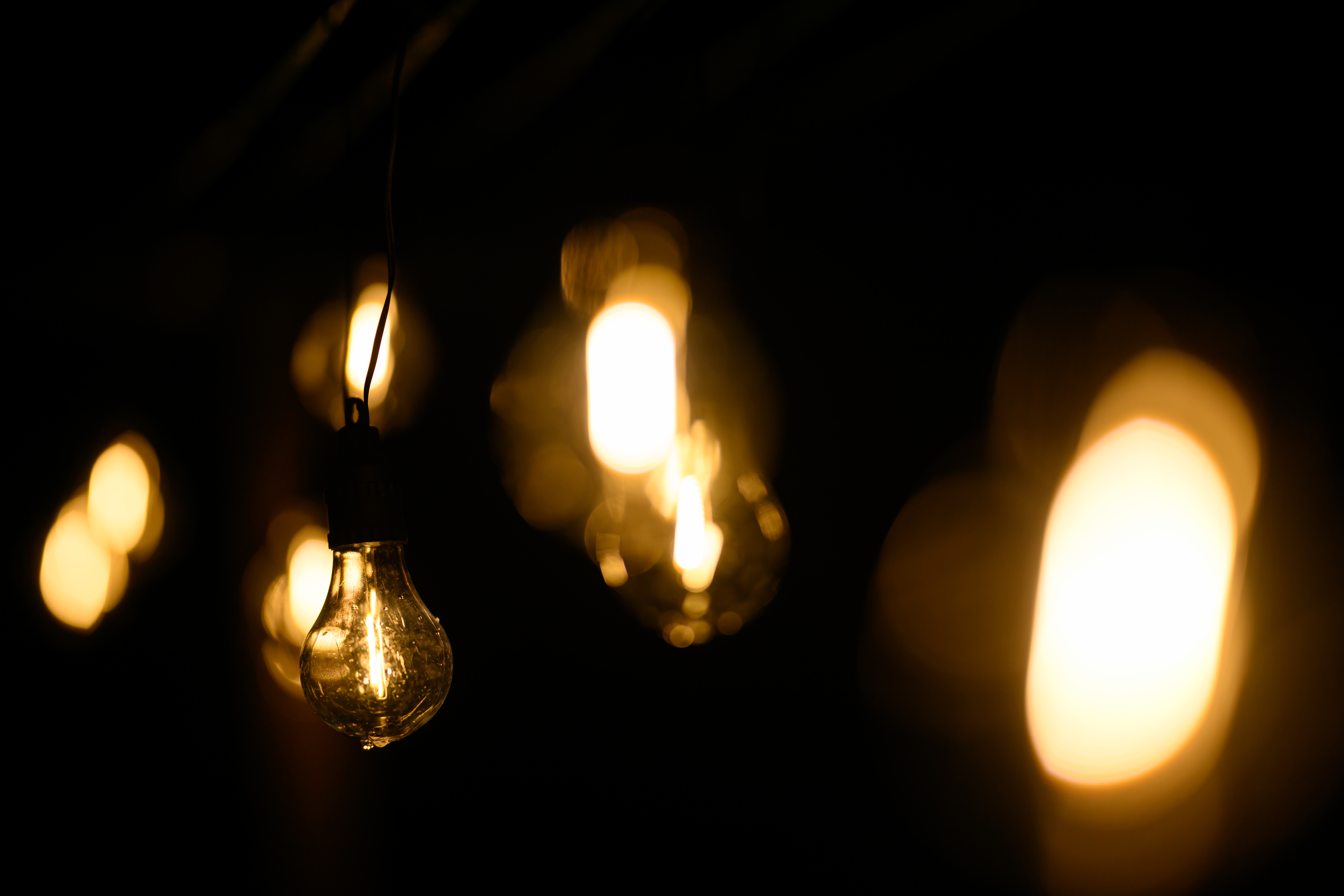
At f/1.2

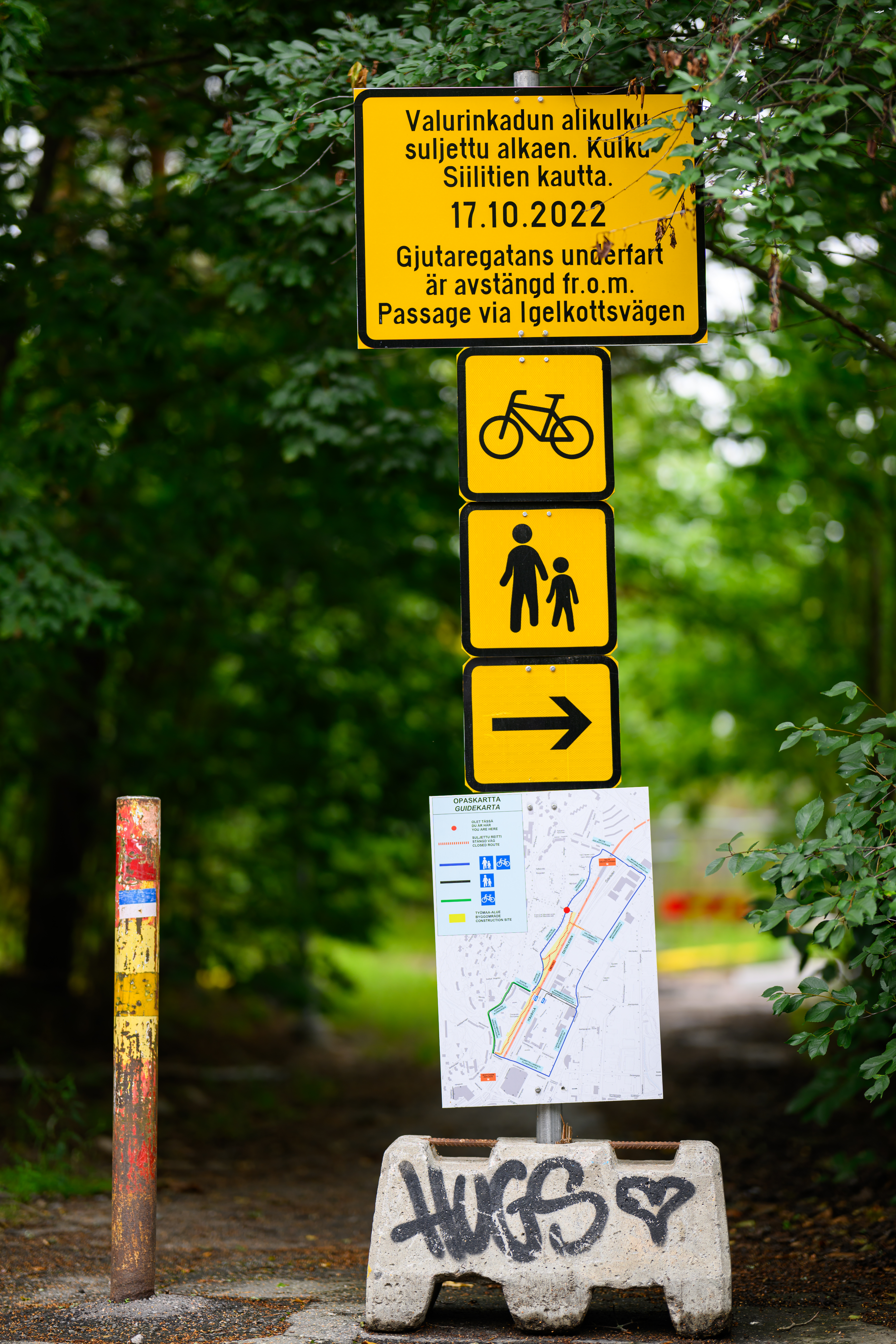
At f/1.2

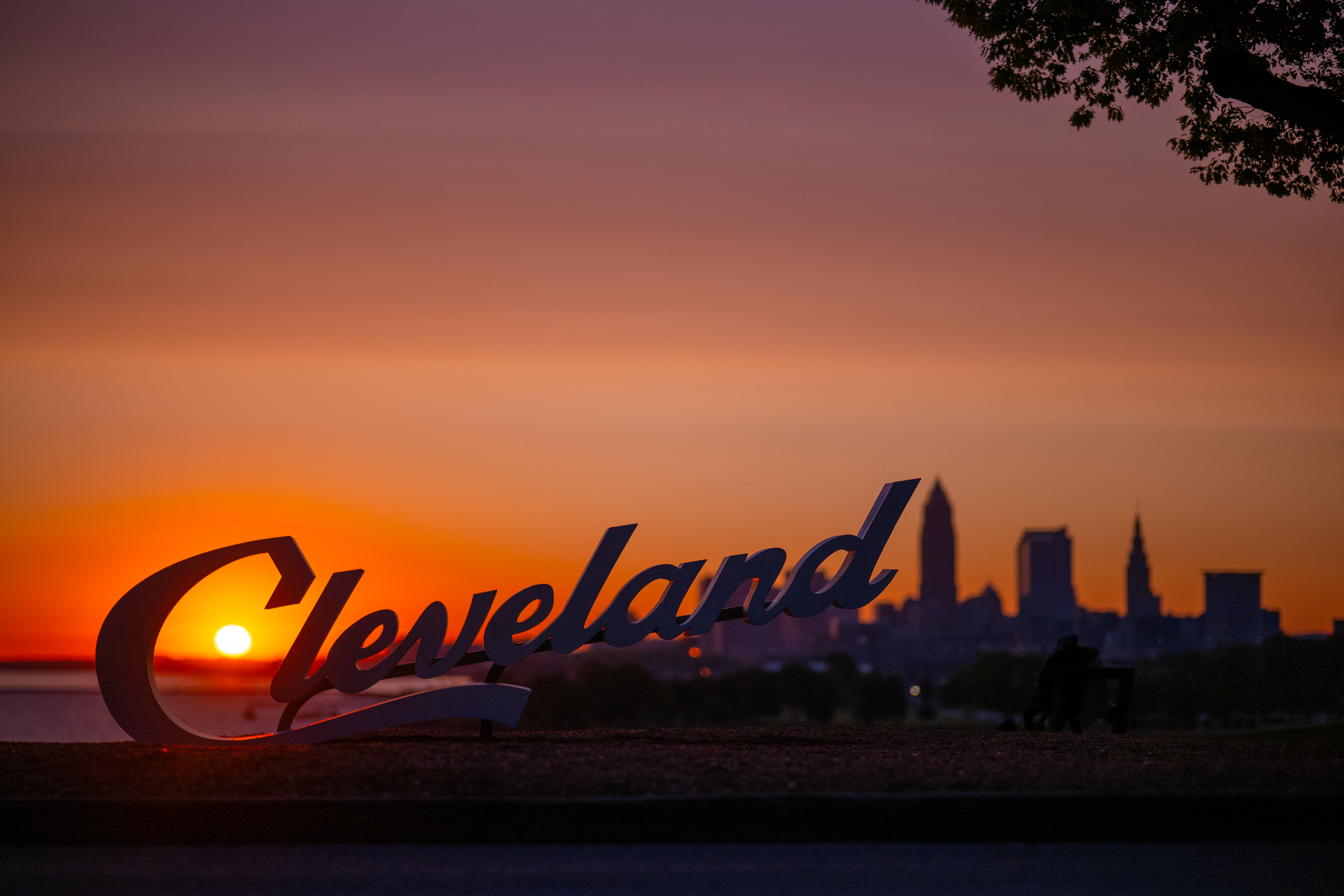
At f/1.2

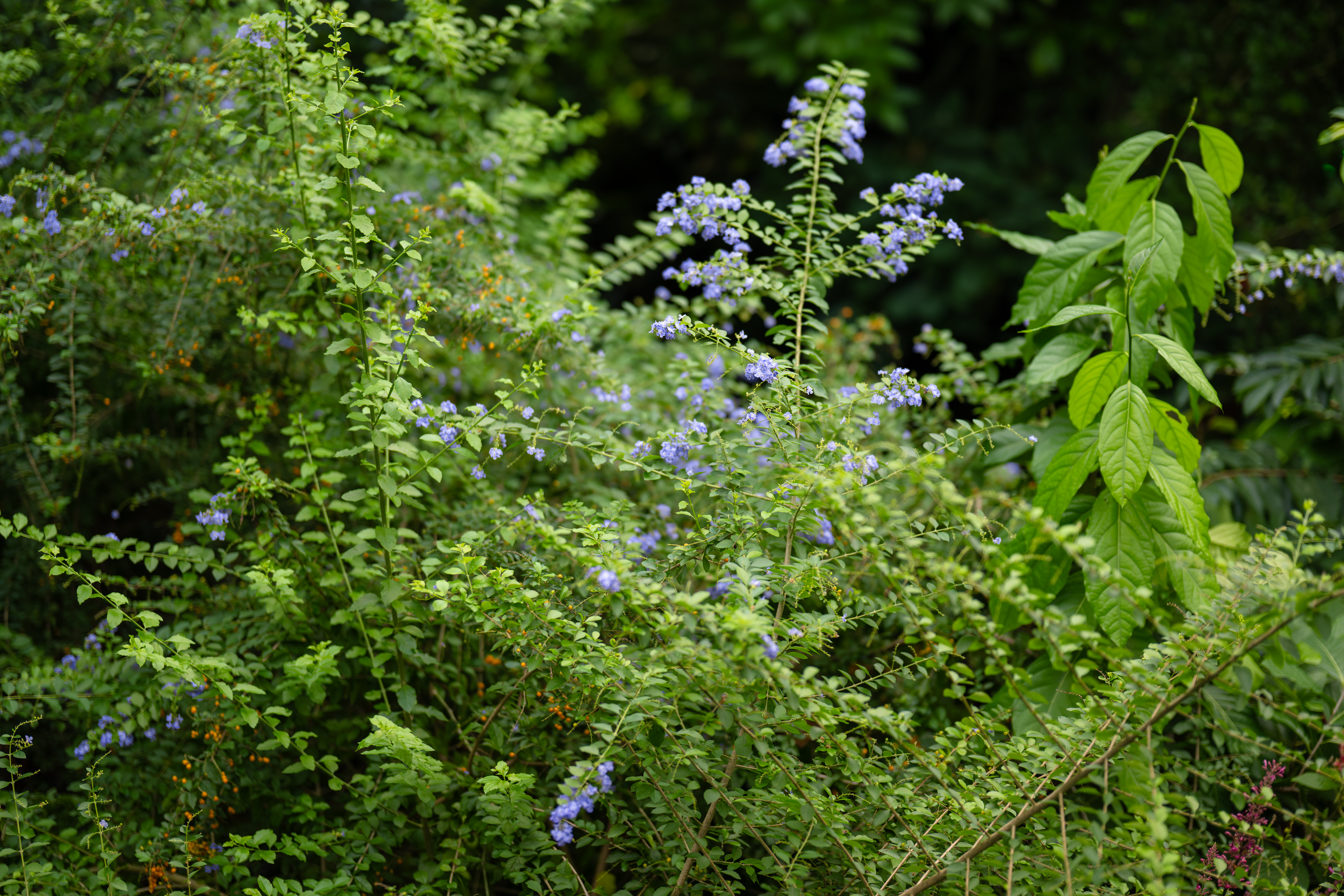
At f/1.2

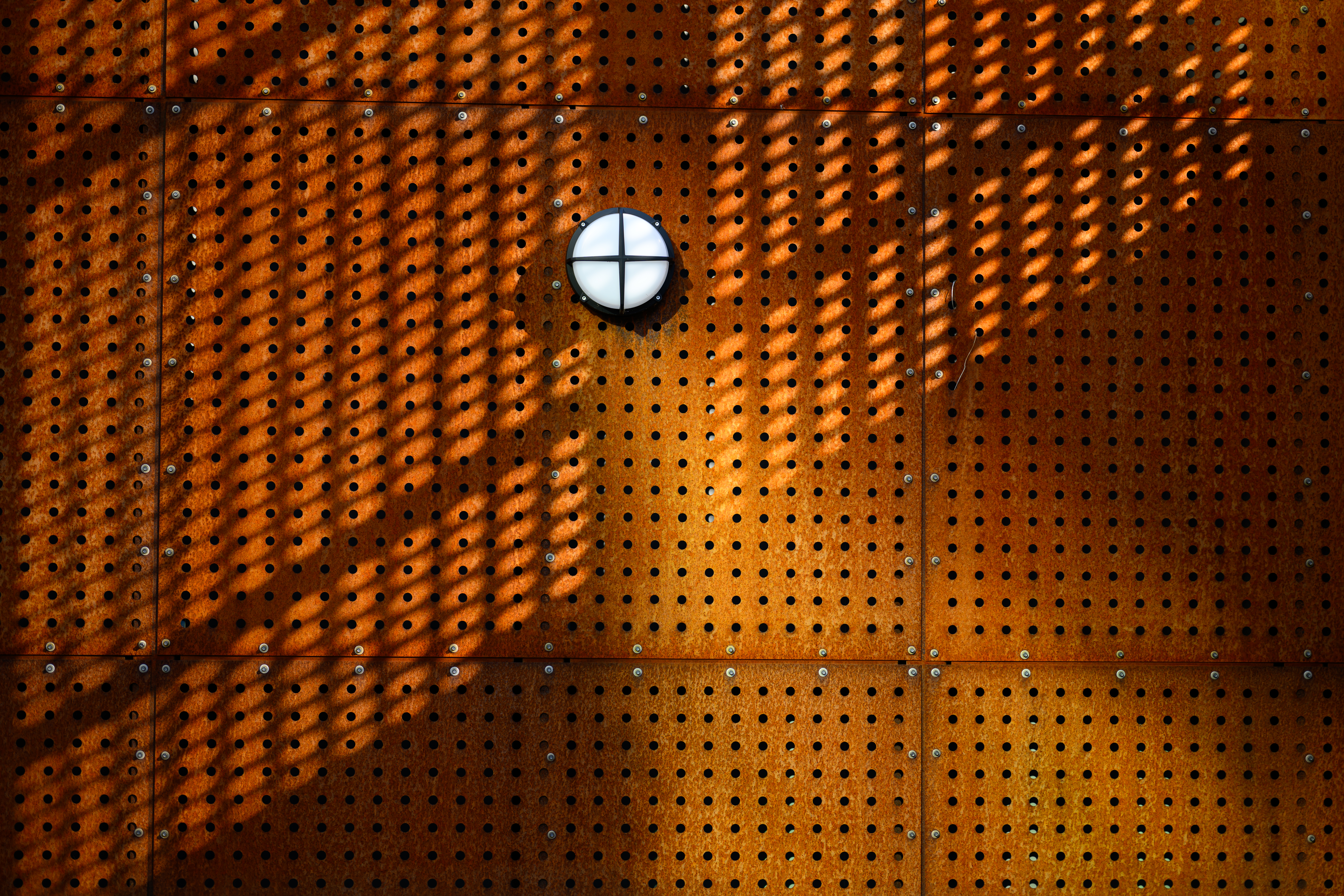
At f/1.2

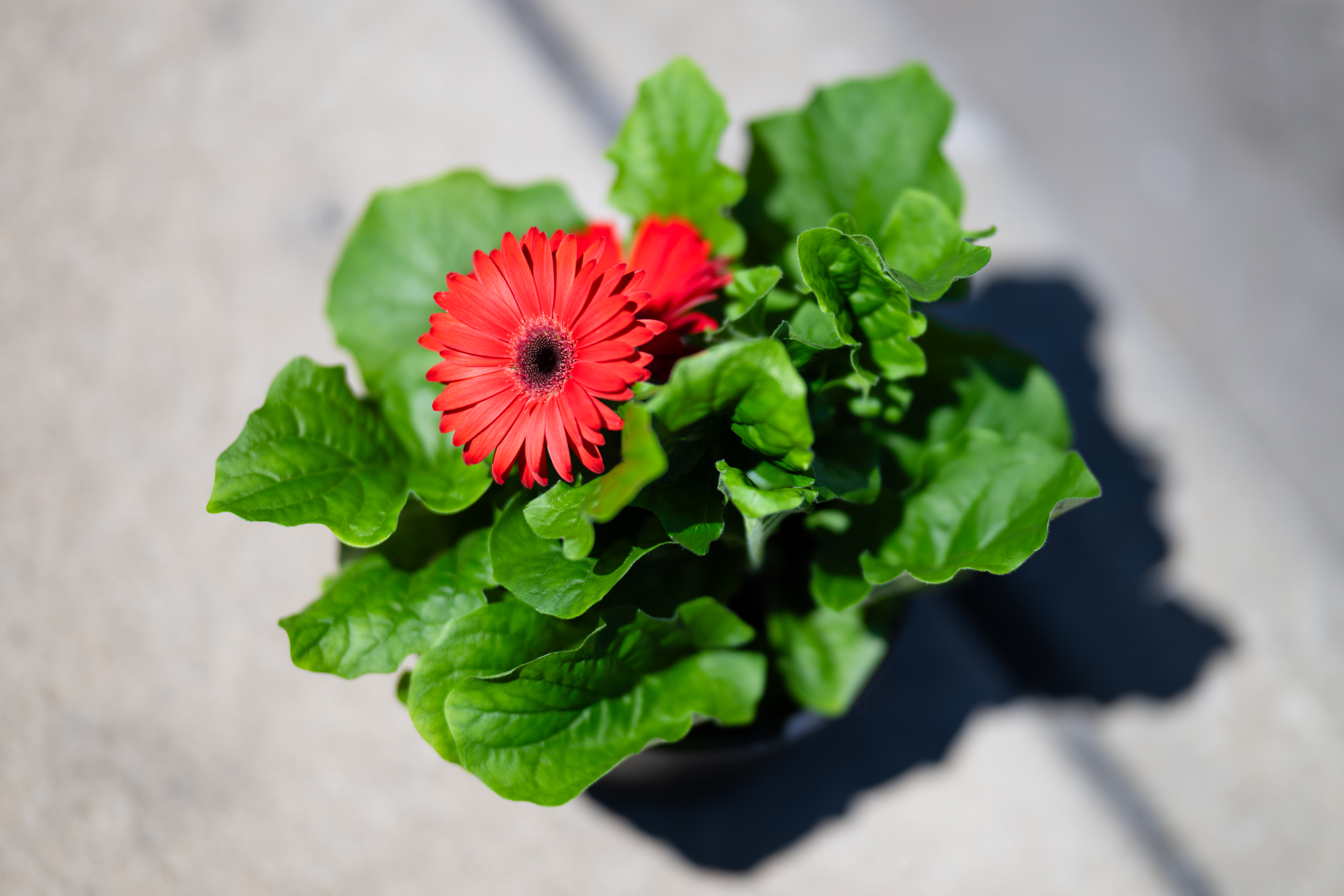
At f/1.2

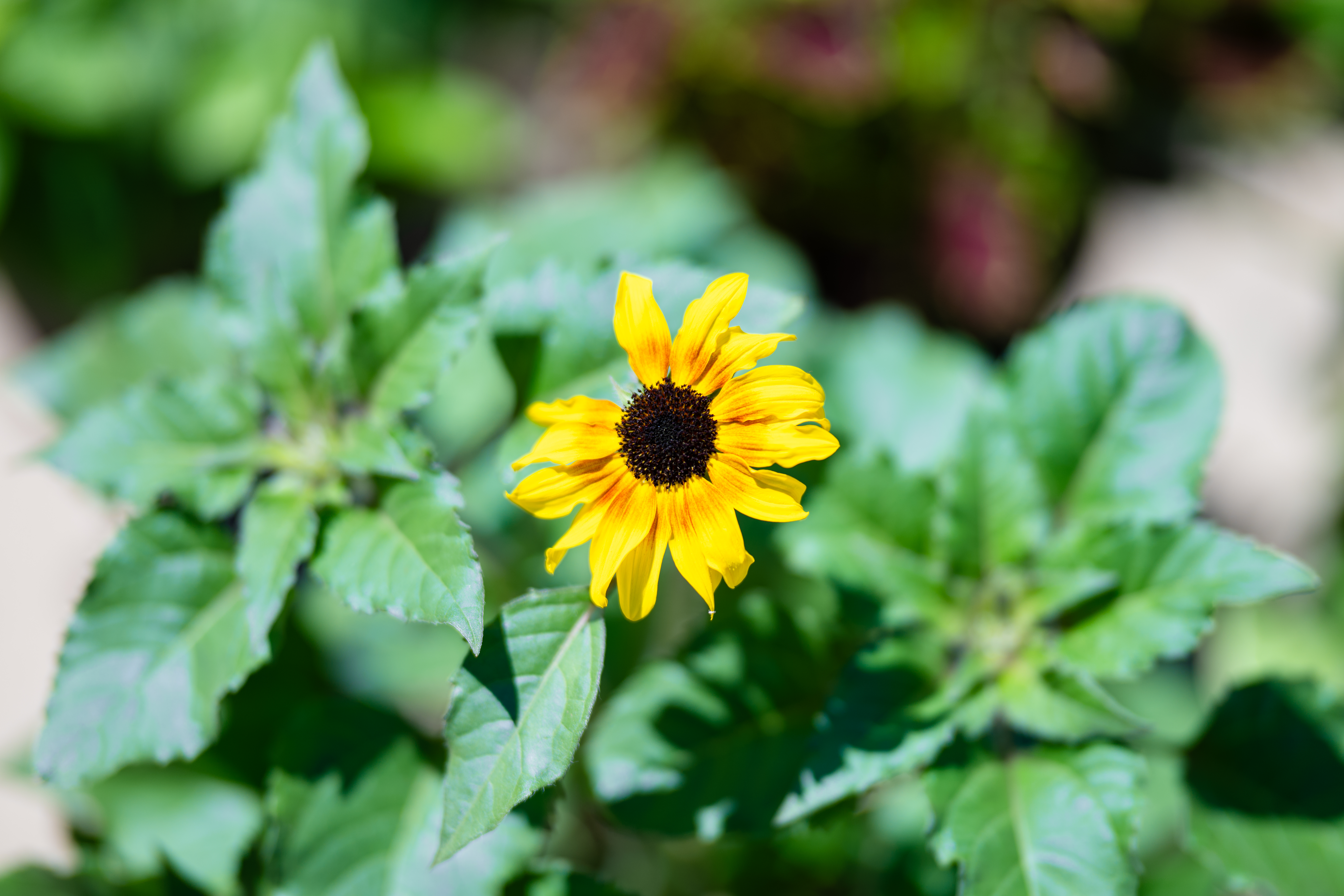
At f/1.2

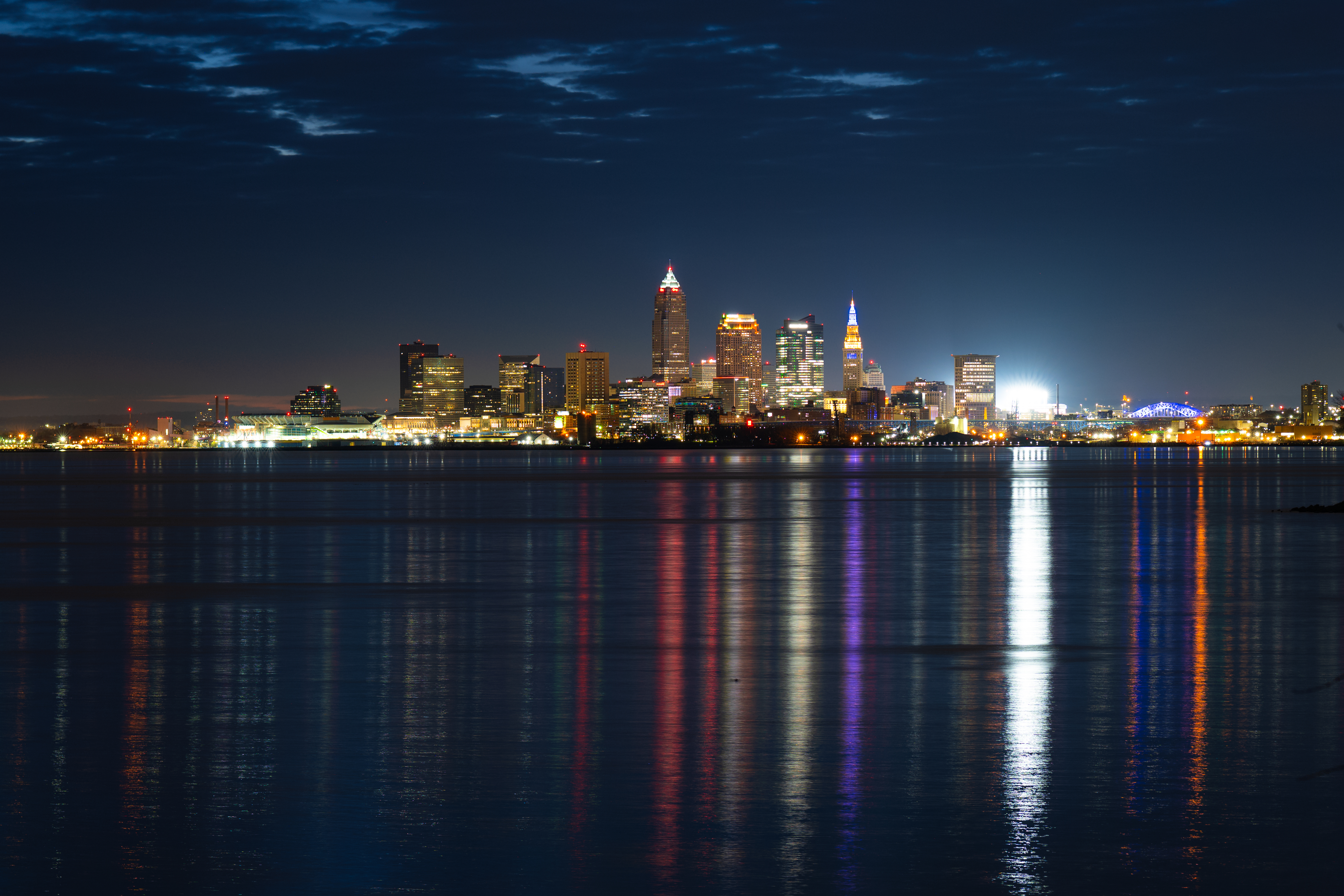
At f/3.5

At f/5.6

== See also ==
- Nikon Z-mount
