= Nikon Nikkor Z 58 mm f/0.95 S Noct =

Nikkor Z 58 mm f/0.95 S Noct
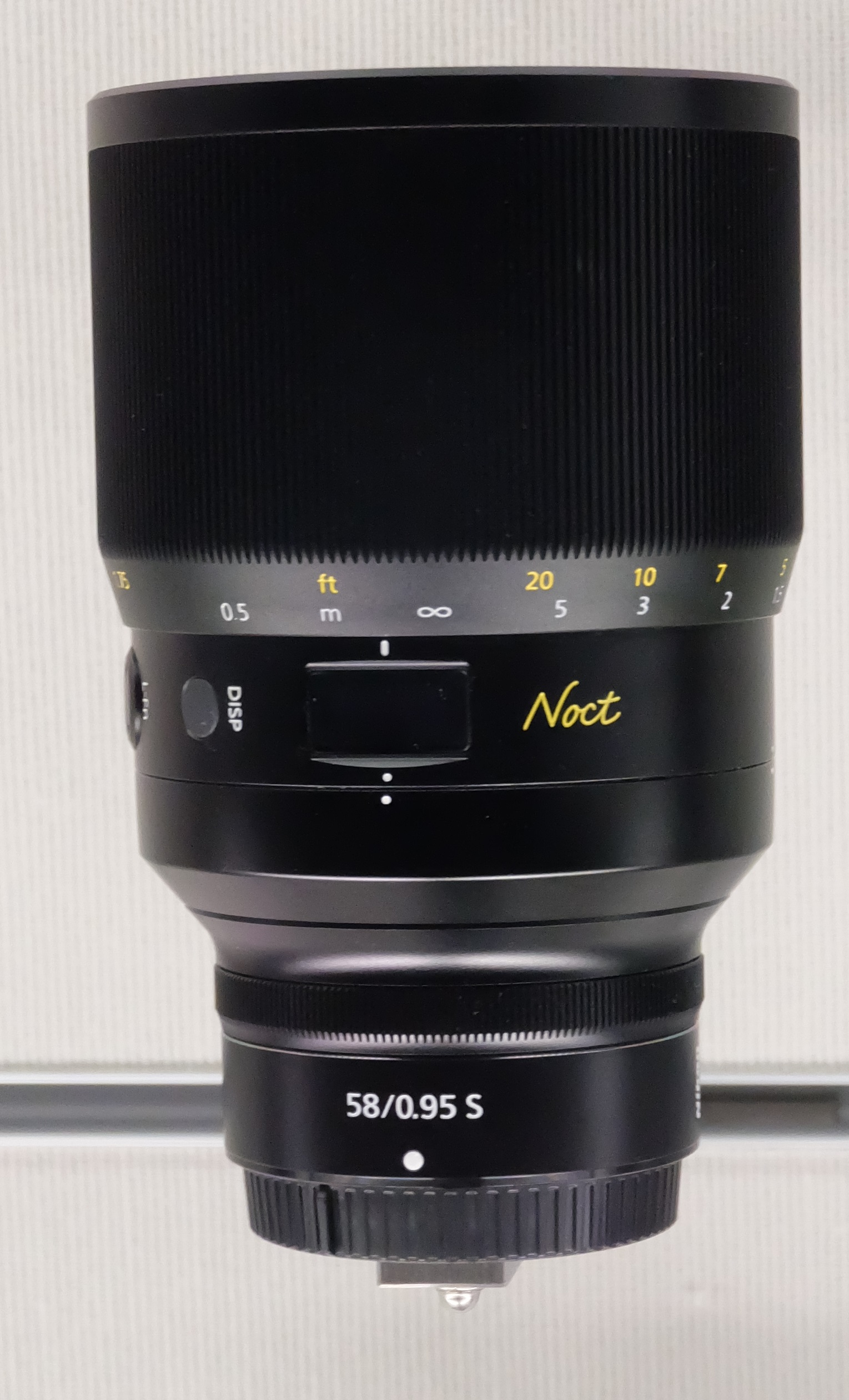
- Maker: Nikon
- Lens mount: Z-mount

Technical data
- Type: Prime
- Focus drive: No No
- Focal length: 58mm
- Image format: FX (full frame)
- Aperture (max/min): f/0.95–16
- Close focus distance: 0.5m
- Max. magnification: 1:5.26
- Diaphragm blades: 11 (rounded)
- Construction: 17 elements in 10 groups

Features
- Lens-based stabilization: No No
- Macro capable: No No
- Unique features: S-Line lens Nano Crystal Coat and ARNEO Coat elements Fluorine element OLED screen
- Application: Normal Lens

Physical
- Max. length: 153 mm
- Diameter: 102 mm
- Weight: 2000 g
- Filter diameter: 82 mm

Software
- Lens ID: 8

Accessories
- Lens hood: HN-38 (screw-on)
- Case: CT-101 (hardshell trunk)

Angle of view
- Diagonal: 40°50' (FX); 27°20' (DX)

History
- Introduction: October 2019

Retail info
- MSRP: 7999.95 USD (as of 2019)

The Nikon Nikkor Z 58 mm f/0.95 S Noct is a full-frame prime lens manufactured by Nikon for use on Nikon Z-mount mirrorless cameras. It is one of the two Nikkor lenses that have the Noct branding (the other one being the Noct-Nikkor 58mm f/1.2 for F-mount), due to its very large aperture of f/0.95. The word "Noct" is engraved in yellow into the lens body.

== Introduction ==
On 23 August 2018, Nikon announced the development of the lens, reintroducing the Noct brand historically used by Nikon for lenses with ultra-fast maximum apertures. This lens was released on October 10, 2019.

The lens comes with a hardshell trunk case (CT-101) and a screw-on metal lens hood (HN-38).

The lens achieved a DXOMark score of 55, the highest score among all tested lenses as of December 2024 (on par with the Nikkor Z 85mm f/1.2 S and Sigma 50mm f/1.4 DG DN Art for Sony E-mount).

== Features ==
- 58 mm focal length (approximately equivalent field of view of a 87 mm lens when used on a DX format camera)
- S-Line lens
- Manual focusing with a wide mechanical focus ring (unlike most autofocus Nikkor Z lenses, which have a focus-by-wire system for the focus ring as well), with a throw of approximately 350°
- 17 elements in 10 groups (including 4 ED glass and 3 aspherical lens elements, Nano Crystal Coat and ARNEO Coat elements and a fluorine-coated front lens element)
- 11-blade rounded diaphragm
- Multi-function OLED display ("lens information panel"), capable of showing aperture, focus distance and depth of field information
- One customizable control ring at the back (aperture, ISO and exposure compensation functions can be assigned to it)
- One customizable function button (L-Fn)

== Awards ==
The lens was awarded with:

- the TIPA World Awards 2020 in category Best Mirrorless Prime Standard Lens,
- the Camera GP 2020 "Editors Award"
- the Red Dot Design Award 2020.

== Sample images ==
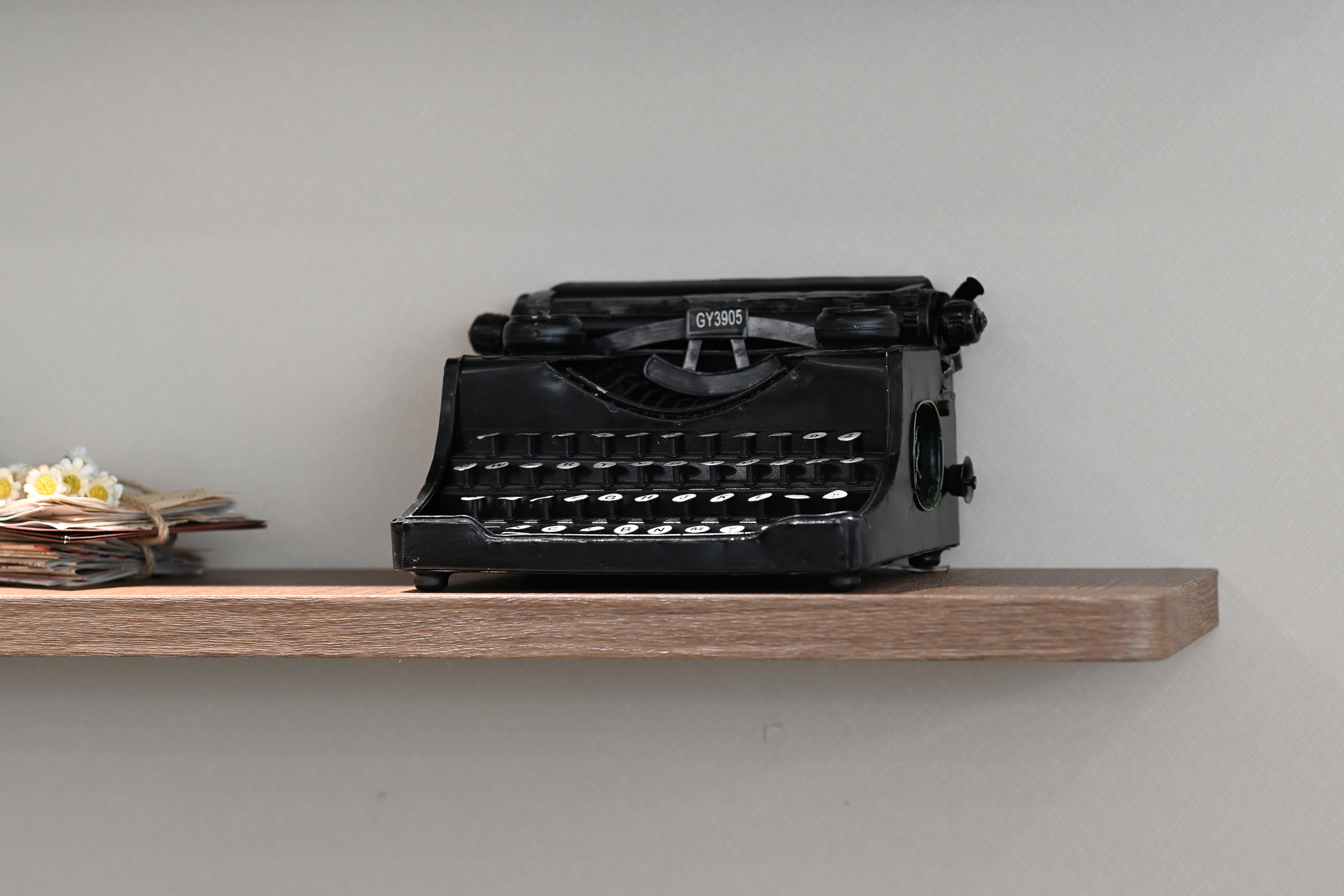
At f/2.8

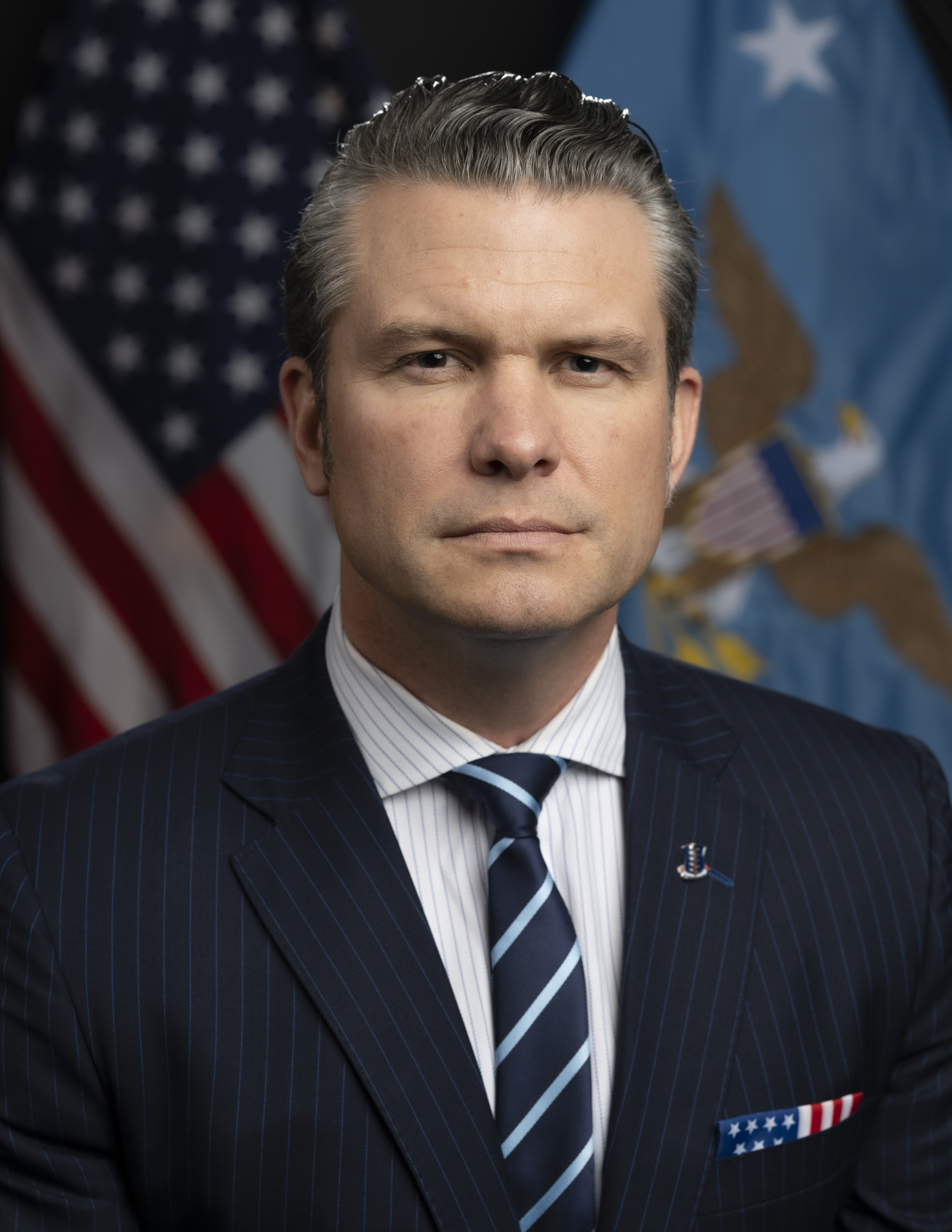
At f/4

== See also ==
- Nikon Z-mount
