= Noct (camera lens) =

Series of camera lenses

Noct brand logo

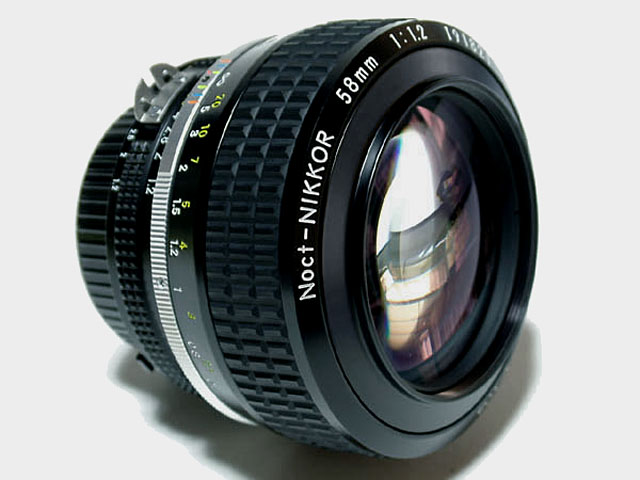
58mm f/1.2 Noct

Noct is Nikon's trademark for its largest-aperture camera lenses: the F-mount Noct-Nikkor 58mm f/1.2 lens produced from 1977 to 1997 and the Z-mount 58mm f/0.95 S Noct introduced in 2018.
