= Nikon AF-S Nikkor 24-120mm f/4G ED VR =

AF-S NIKKOR 24-120mm f/4G IF-ED VR
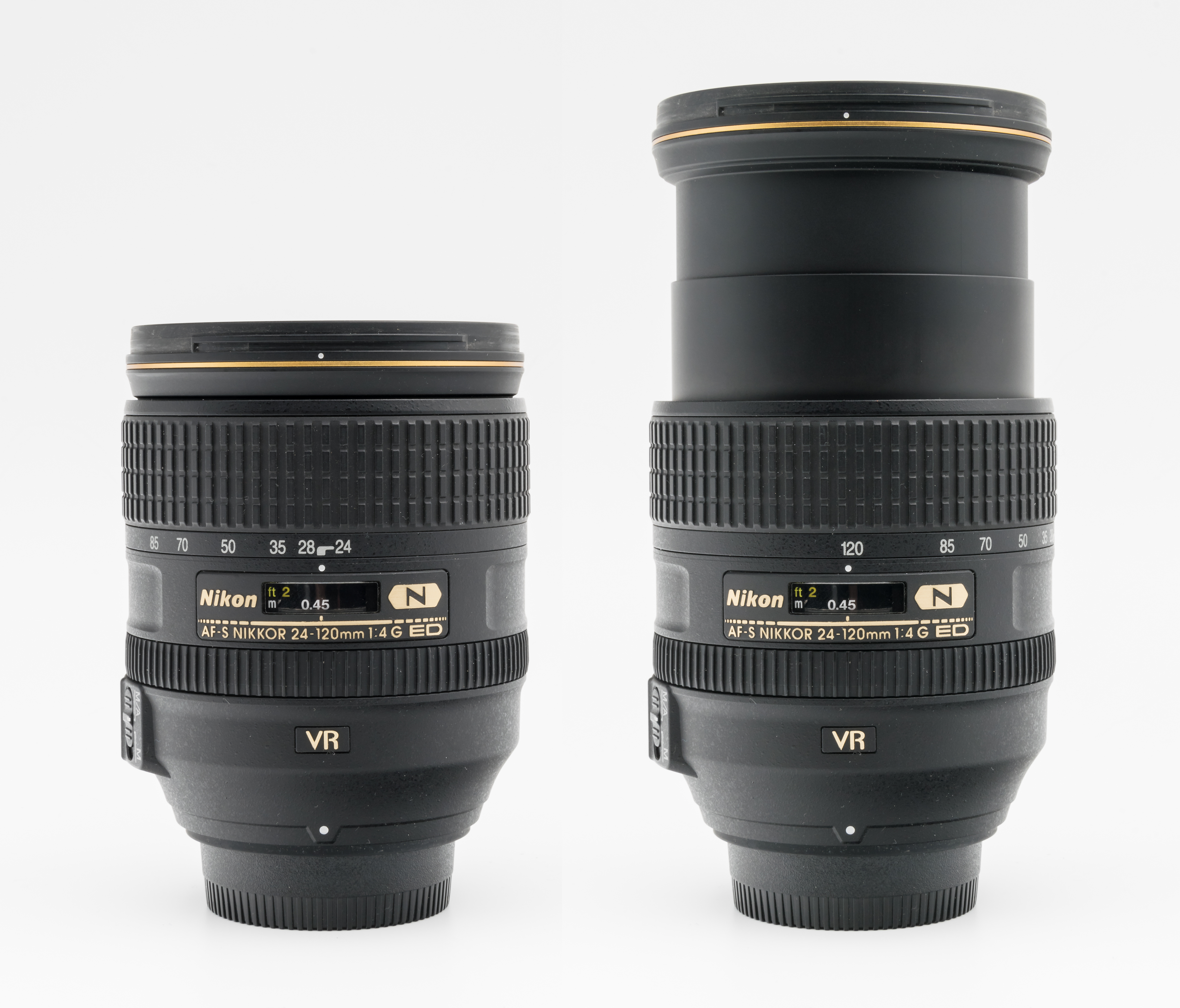
- Maker: Nikon
- Lens mount: F-mount

Technical data
- Type: Zoom
- Focus drive: Silent wave motor
- Focal length: 24-120mm
- Image format: FX (full-frame)
- Aperture (max/min): f/4 - f/22
- Close focus distance: 1.3 ft. (0.4m)
- Max. magnification: 1:4.2
- Diaphragm blades: 9 (rounded)
- Construction: 17 elements in 13 groups

Features
- Lens-based stabilization: Yes Yes
- Macro capable: No No
- Aperture ring: No No
- Application: Standard zoom

Physical
- Max. length: 103mm
- Diameter: 84mm
- Weight: 707.6g
- Filter diameter: 77mm

Accessories
- Lens hood: HB-53
- Case: CL-1218

History
- Introduction: 2010
- Successor: Z 24-120 mm f/4 S (Z-mount)

Retail info
- MSRP: 1299.95 USD

The Nikon AF-S Zoom-Nikkor 24-120mm f/4G IF-ED VR is a 5x standard zoom lens with a fixed maximum aperture of f/4 throughout its entire zoom range.

== Features ==
- 24-120mm focal length
- Compact silent wave autofocus motor with full-time manual override
- Nikon F-lens mount for use with Nikon FX format DSLRs
- Rear-focussing elements allow for a non-rotating lens front, enabling easier usage of rotating filters such as circular polarisers
- Dust gasket around lens mount to reduce dust entering when lens and camera are attached

== Construction ==
- 17 lens elements in 13 groups
- 3 hybrid aspherical elements
- 2 ED elements
- Nano crystal coat

== See also ==
- List of Nikon compatible lenses with integrated autofocus-motor
