= Nikon Nikkor Z 100-400 mm f/4.5-5.6 VR S =

Nikkor Z 100-400 mm f/4.5–5.6 VR S
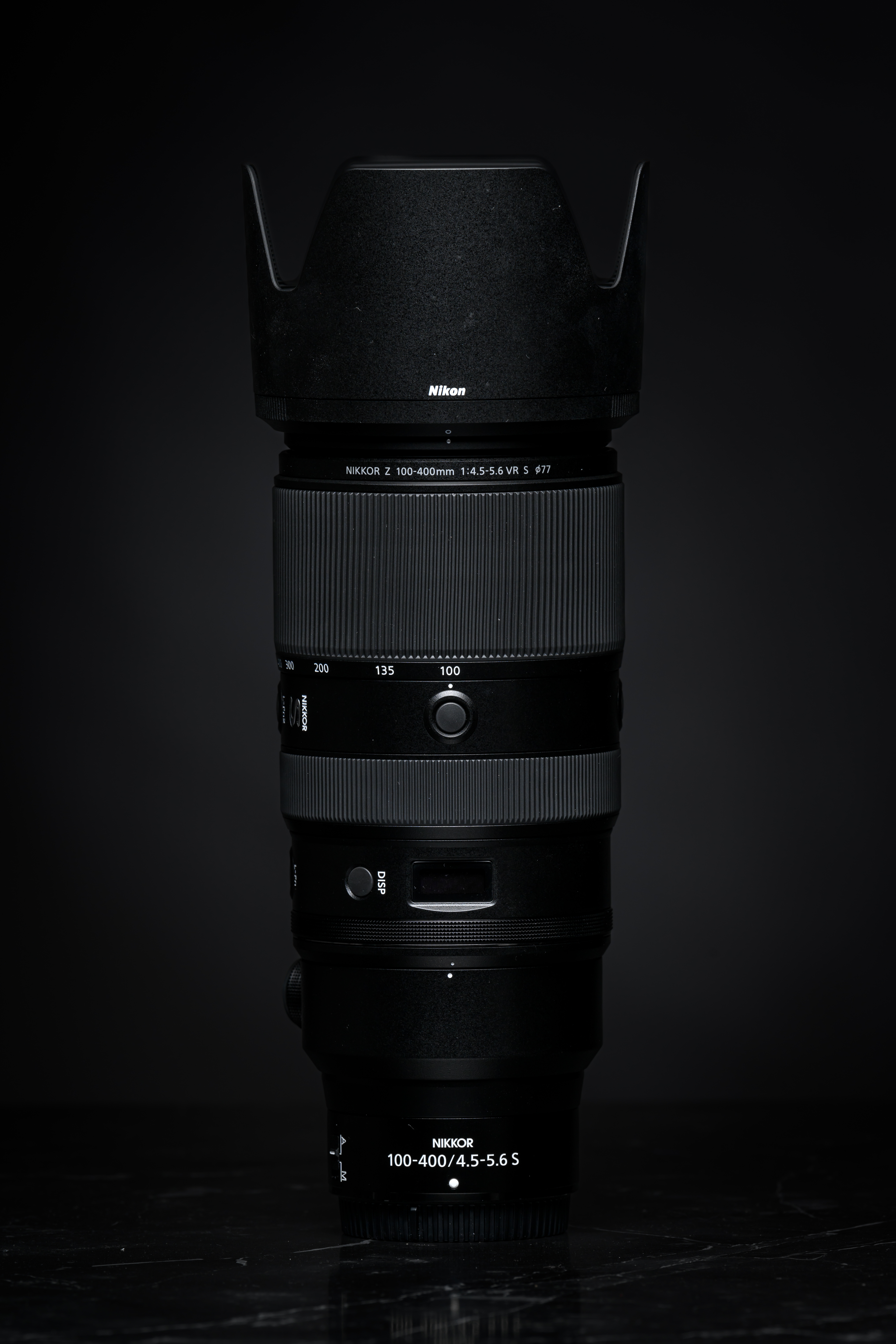
- Maker: Nikon
- Lens mount: Z-mount

Technical data
- Type: Zoom
- Focus drive: 2 × stepping motors
- Focal length: 100-400mm
- Image format: FX (full frame)
- Aperture (max/min): f/4.5–32 (wide) f/5.6–40 (tele)
- Close focus distance: 0.75m (wide); 0.98m (tele)
- Max. magnification: 1:2.6
- Diaphragm blades: 9 (rounded)
- Construction: 25 elements in 20 groups

Features
- Lens-based stabilization: Yes Yes
- Macro capable: No No
- Unique features: S-Line lens Nano Crystal Coat and ARNEO Coat elements Fluorine-coated front element OLED screen
- Application: Super-telephoto zoom

Physical
- Max. length: 222 mm
- Diameter: 98 mm
- Weight: 1435 g (w/ tripod collar); 1355 g
- Filter diameter: 77 mm

Software
- Latest firmware: 1.10 (as of 26 April 2022)
- User flashable: Yes Yes
- Lens ID: 28

Accessories
- Lens hood: HB-103 (bayonet)
- Case: CL-C3

Angle of view
- Diagonal: 24°20'–6°10' (FX); 16°–4° (DX)

History
- Introduction: October 2021

Retail info
- MSRP: 2699.95 USD (as of 2021)

The Nikon Nikkor Z 100-400 mm f/4.5–5.6 VR S is a full-frame super-telephoto zoom lens with a variable aperture of f/4.5–5.6, manufactured by Nikon for use on Nikon Z-mount mirrorless cameras.

== Introduction ==
The lens was introduced on October 28, 2021 (along with the Nikkor Z 24-120 mm f/4 S and FTZ II mount adapter). The lens comes with a bayonet-type lens hood (HB-103). The lens is compatible with teleconverters Z TC-1.4x and Z TC-2.0x.

Spencer Cox of Photography Life called the lens "one of the best telephotos for Nikon mirrorless shooters" as of review publication date, highlighting very strong optics and a useful combination of focal length, build and image quality. Ryan Mense of PetaPixel described it as "an impressive piece of glass that can produce high-quality images in any lighting situation", with the close focusing ability and support for teleconverters making the lens a versatile addition to anyone's kit.

== Features ==
- 100-400 mm focal length (approximately equivalent field of view of a 150-600 mm lens when used on a DX format camera)
- Autofocus using two high-speed stepping motors (STM), dedicated focus-by-wire manual focus ring
- 25 elements in 20 groups (including 6 ED glass, 2 Super ED, elements with Nano Crystal Coat and ARNEO Coat, and a fluorine-coated front lens element)
- 9-blade rounded diaphragm
- Vibration Reduction (VR) optical stabilization
- Internal focusing (IF lens)
- Multi-function OLED display ("lens information panel"), capable of showing aperture, focus distance and depth of field information
- One customizable control ring at the back (aperture, ISO and exposure compensation functions can be assigned to it)
- One L-Fn and four L-Fn2 customizable buttons for a total of 2 assignable functions
- A/M switch for autofocus/manual focus modes
- Focus limiter switch (full and infinity - 3 m)
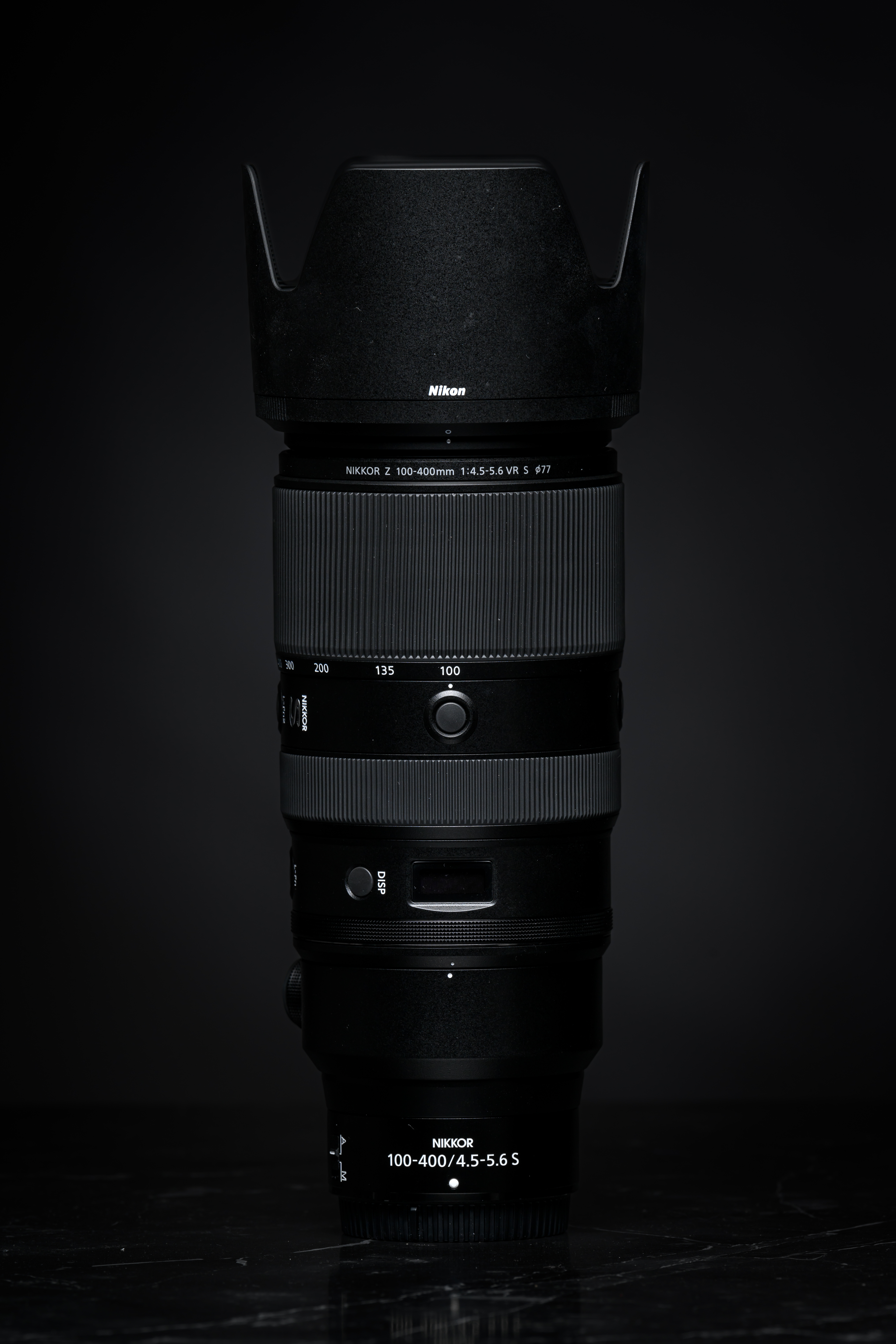
With lens hood attached

== Sample images ==
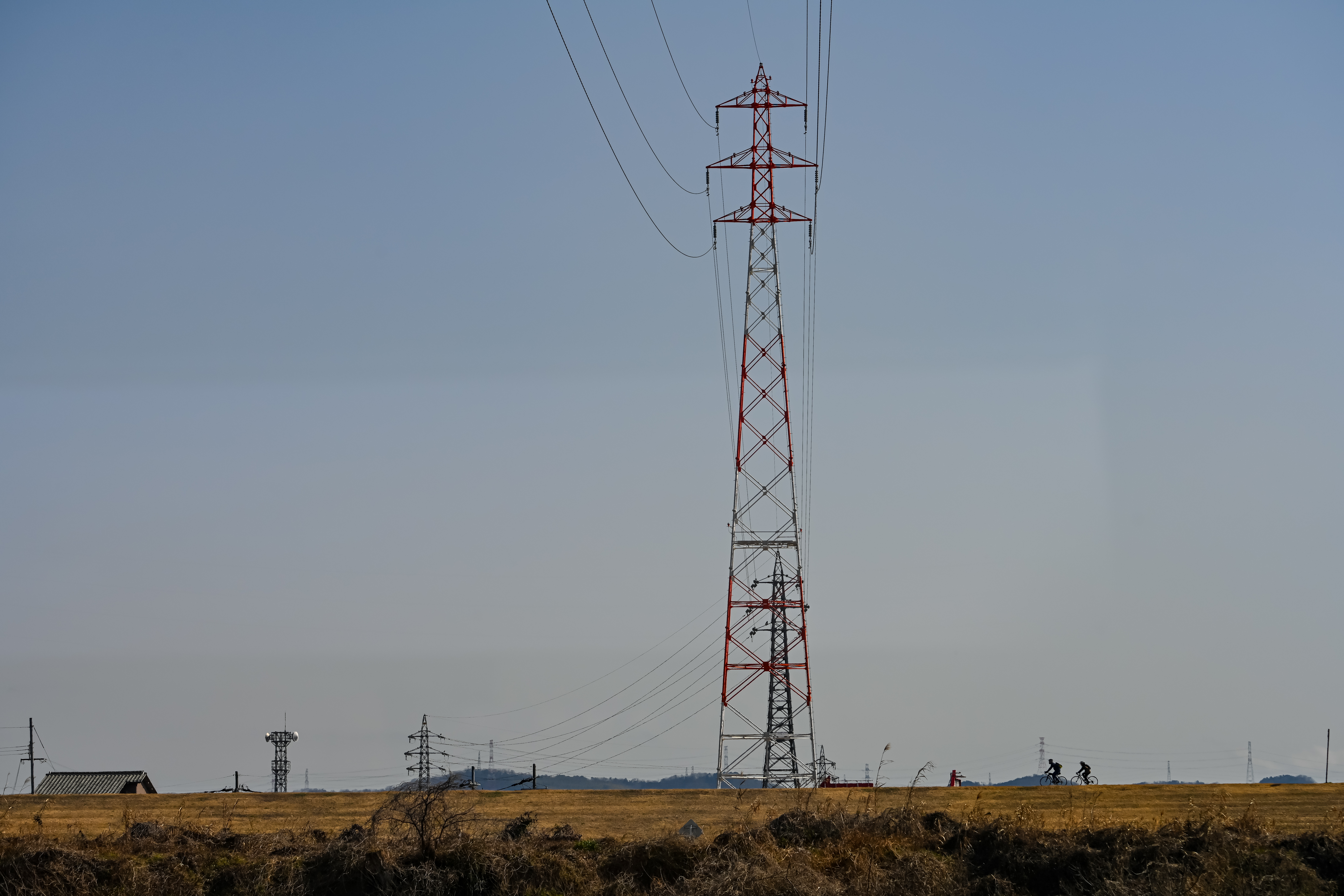
At 130 mm, f/8

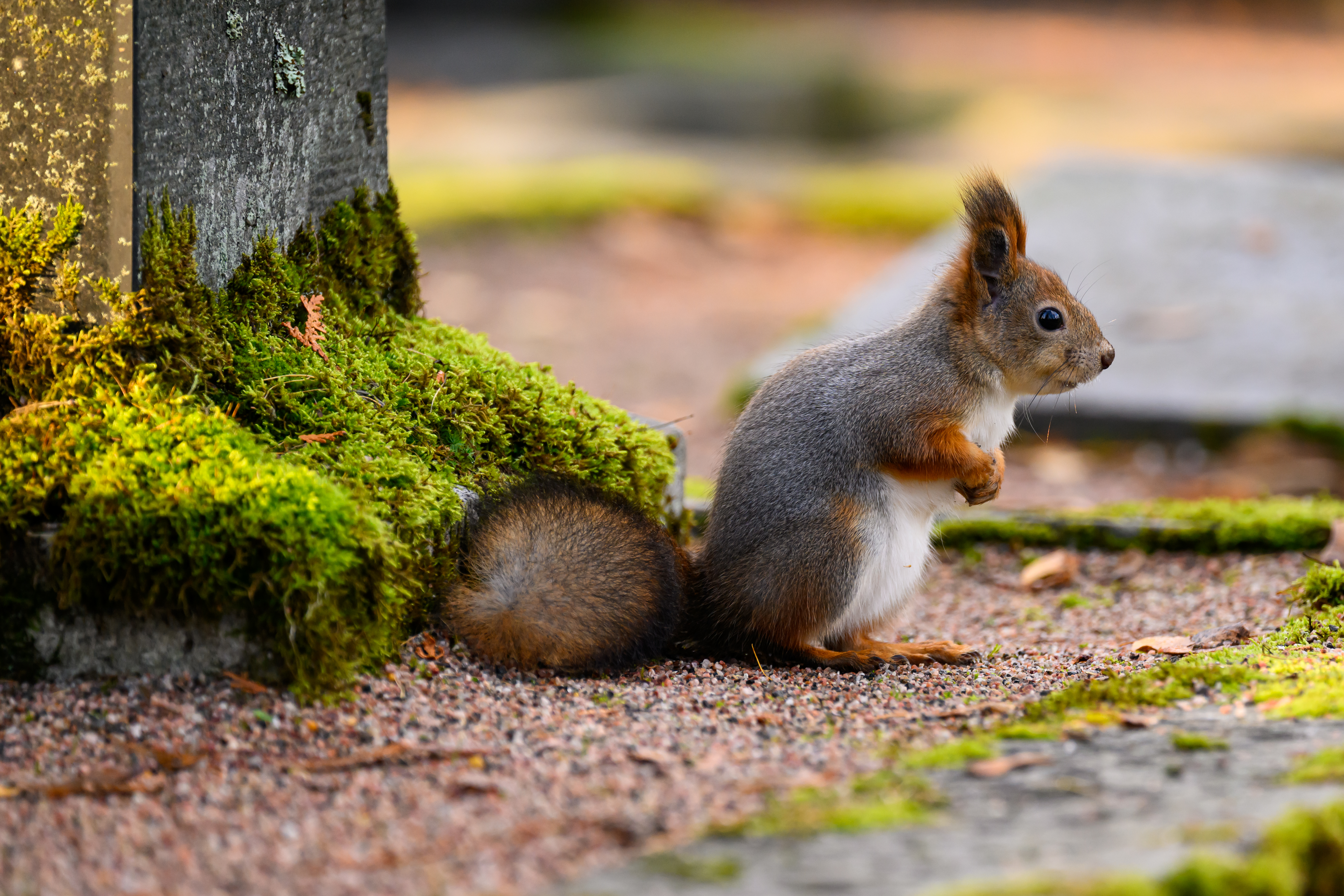
At 300 mm, f/5.3

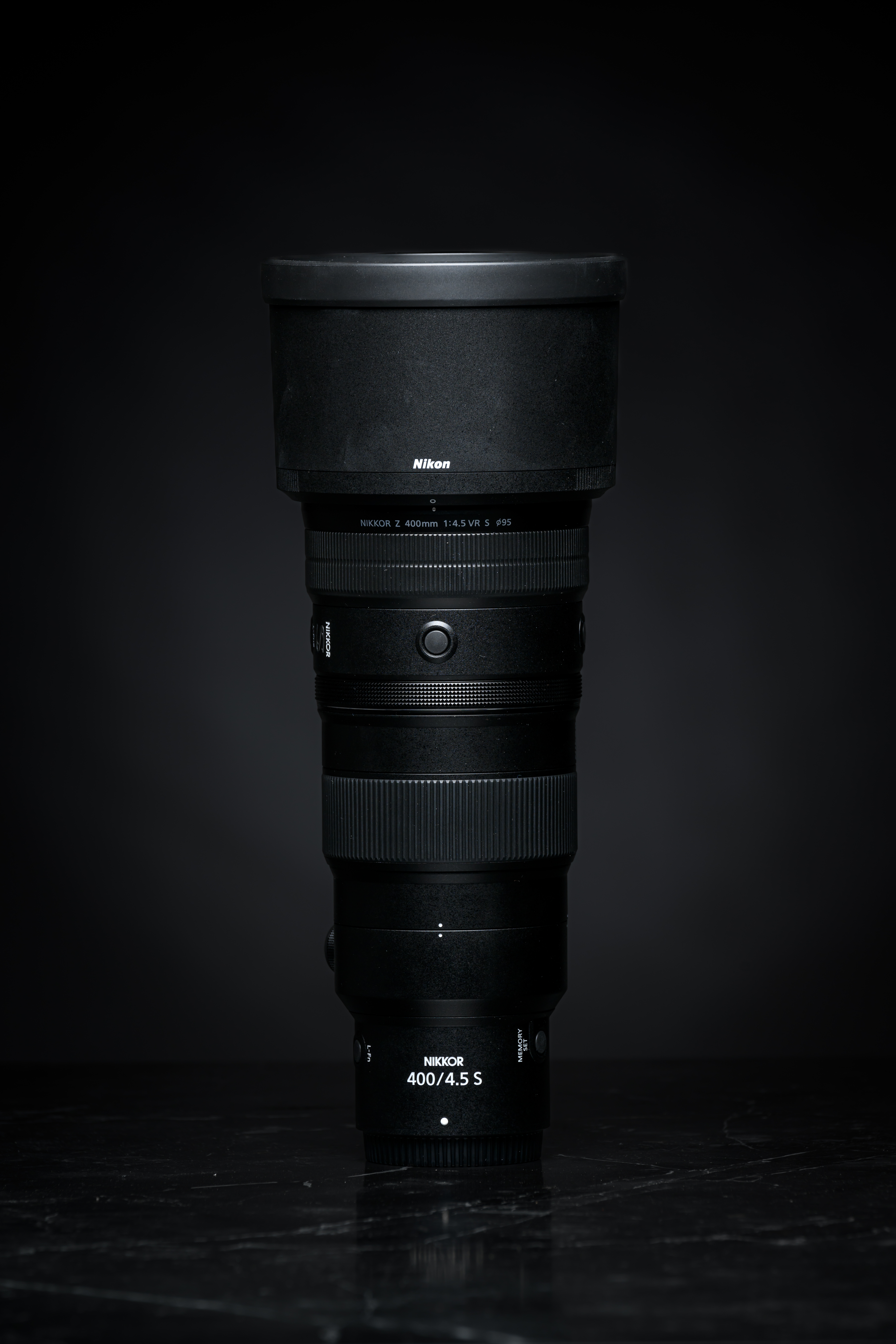
At 330 mm, f/10

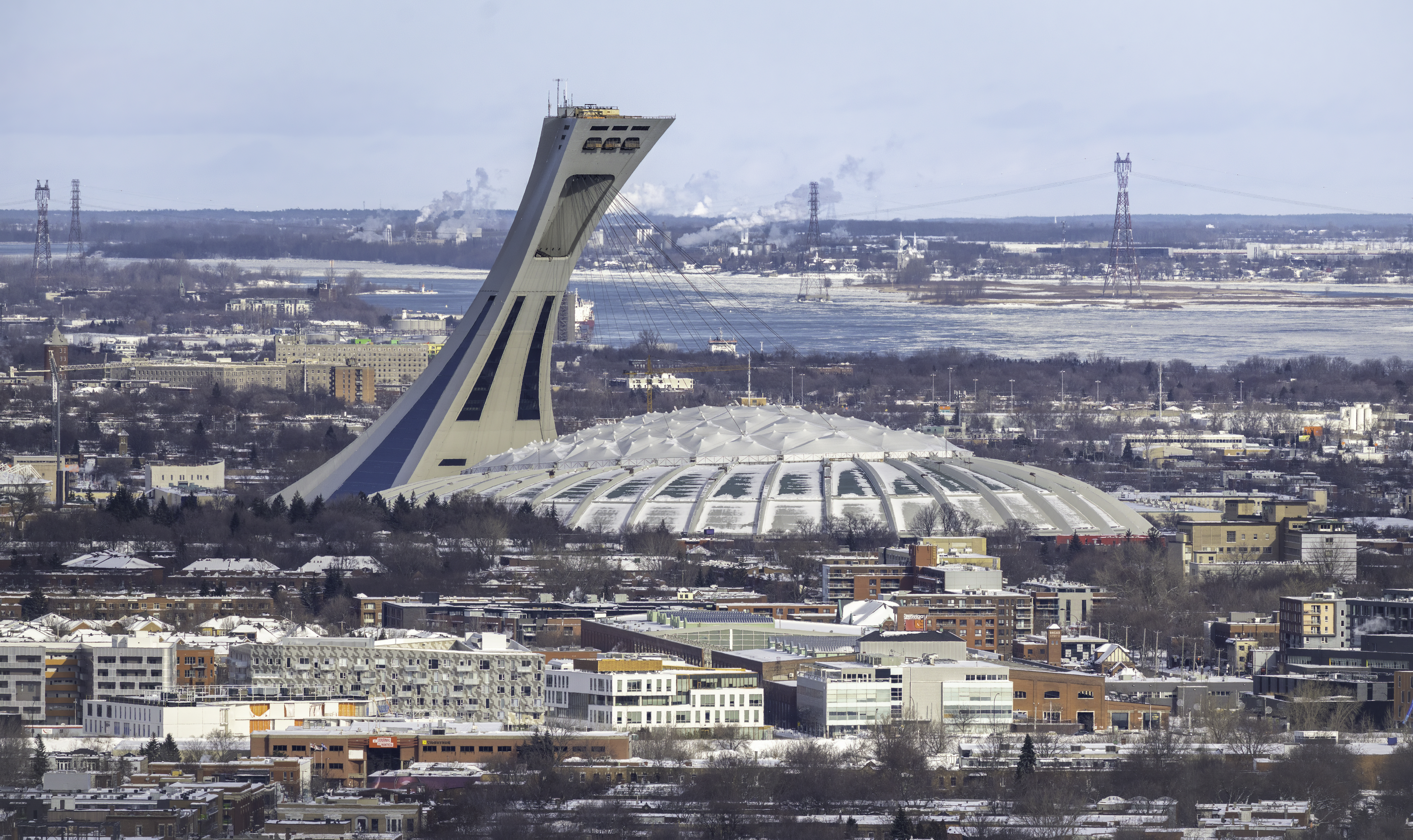
At 400 mm, f/6.3

== See also ==
- Nikon Z-mount
