= Nikon Nikkor Z 24-120 mm f/4 S =

Nikkor Z 24-120 mm f/4 S
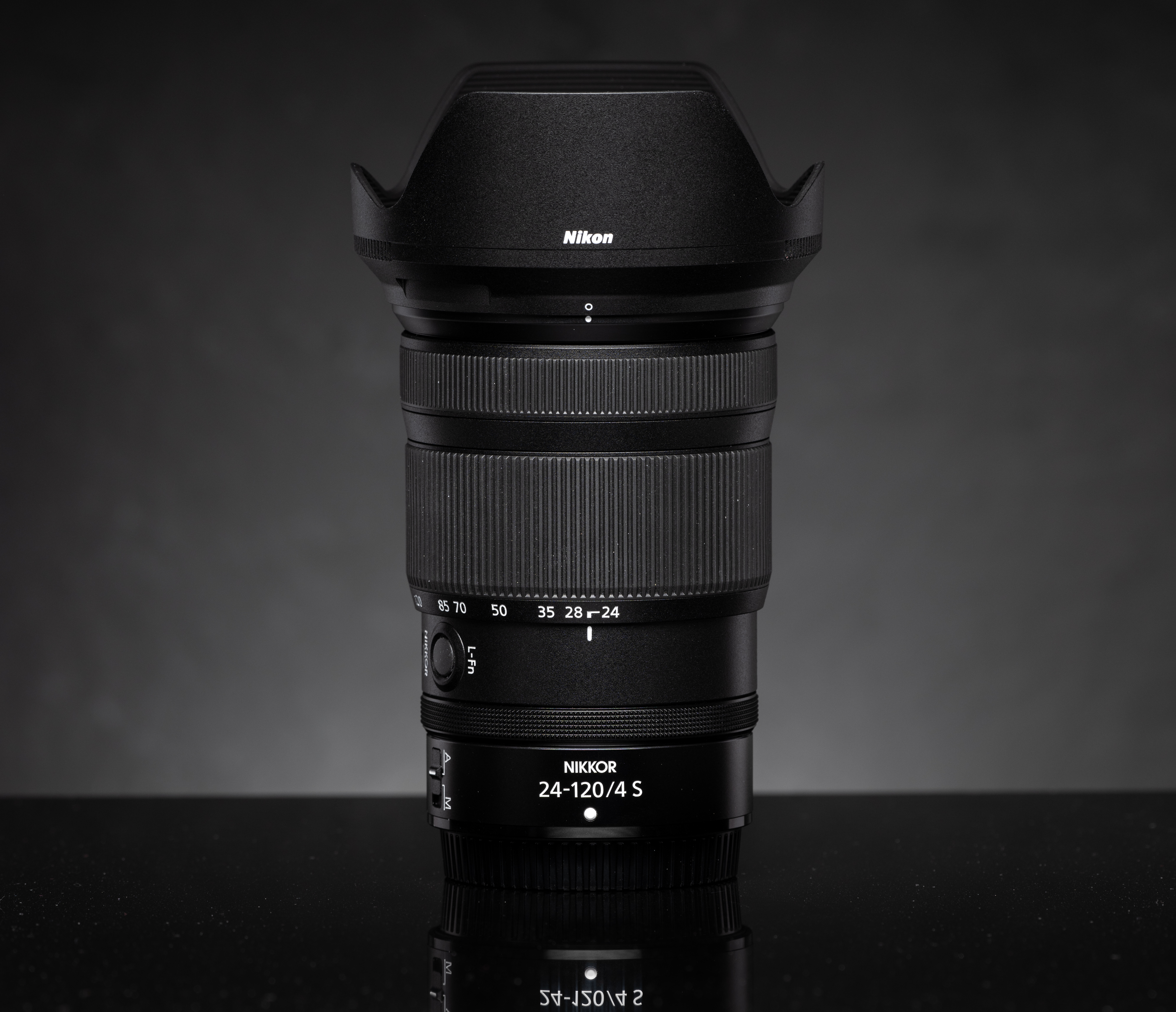
- Maker: Nikon
- Lens mount: Z-mount

Technical data
- Type: Zoom
- Focus drive: Stepping motors
- Focal length: 24-120mm
- Image format: FX (full frame)
- Aperture (max/min): f/4–22
- Close focus distance: 0.35m
- Max. magnification: 1:2.6
- Diaphragm blades: 9 (rounded)
- Construction: 16 elements in 13 groups

Features
- Lens-based stabilization: No No
- Macro capable: No No
- Unique features: S-Line lens Nano Crystal Coat elements ARNEO Coat; Fluorine Coat
- Application: Standard zoom

Physical
- Max. length: 118 mm
- Diameter: 84 mm
- Weight: 630 g
- Filter diameter: 77 mm

Software
- Latest firmware: 1.20 (as of 14 May 2026)
- User flashable: Yes Yes
- Lens ID: 31

Accessories
- Lens hood: HB-102 (bayonet)
- Case: CL-C2

Angle of view
- Diagonal: 84°–20°20' (FX); 61°–13°20' (DX)

History
- Introduction: October 2021
- Predecessor: AF-S 24-120 mm f/4G ED VR (F-mount)

Retail info
- MSRP: 1099.95 USD (as of 2021)

The Nikon Nikkor Z 24-120 mm f/4 S is a full-frame standard zoom lens with a constant aperture of f/4, manufactured by Nikon for use on Nikon Z-mount mirrorless cameras.

== Introduction ==
The lens was introduced on October 28, 2021 (along with the Nikkor Z 100-400 mm f/4.5–5.6 VR S and FTZ II mount adapter). The lens comes with a bayonet-type lens hood (HB-102).

== Features ==
- 24-120 mm focal length (approximately equivalent field of view of a 36-180 mm lens when used on a DX format camera)
- S-Line lens
- Autofocus using dual stepping motors (STM), dedicated focus-by-wire manual focus ring (at the front of the lens)
- 16 elements in 13 groups (including three ED, one aspherical ED glass, three aspherical lens elements, elements with Nano Crystal Coat and ARNEO Coat, and a fluorine-coated front lens element)
- Nine-blade rounded diaphragm
- Internal focusing (IF lens)
- One customizable control ring at the back (aperture, ISO and exposure compensation functions can be assigned to it)
- A/M switch for autofocus/manual focus modes
- One L-Fn customizable function button
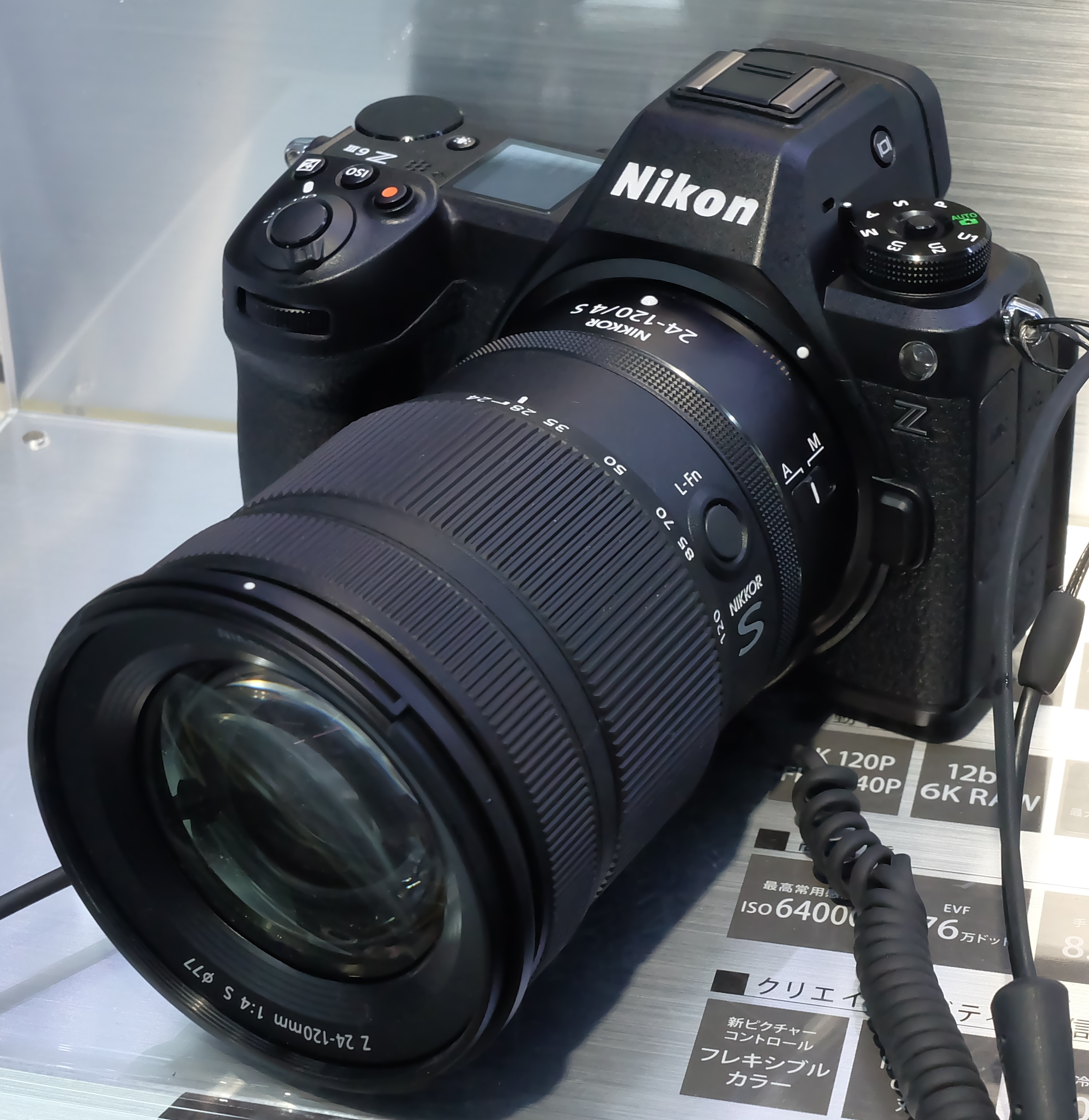
On a Z6III

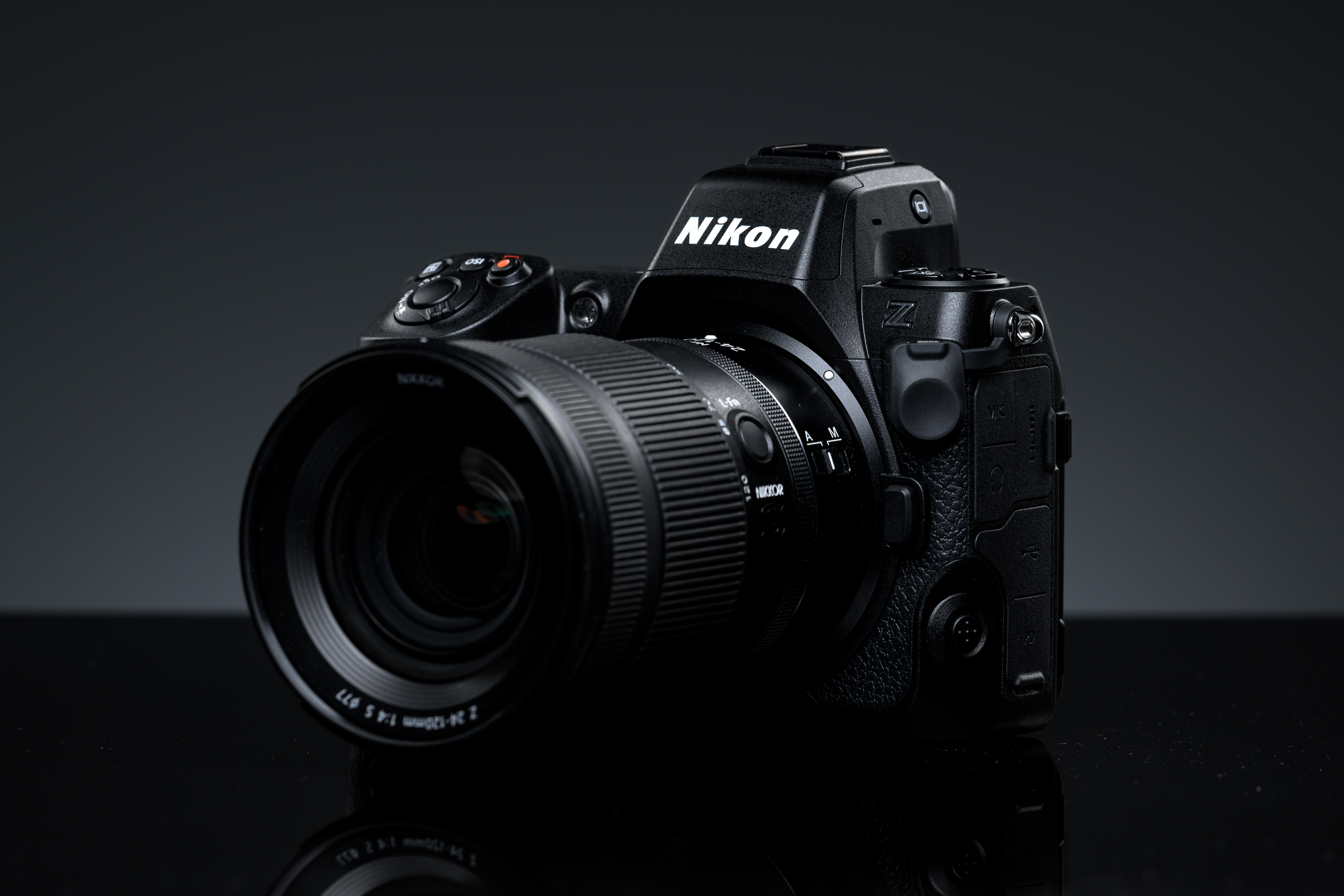
On a Z8

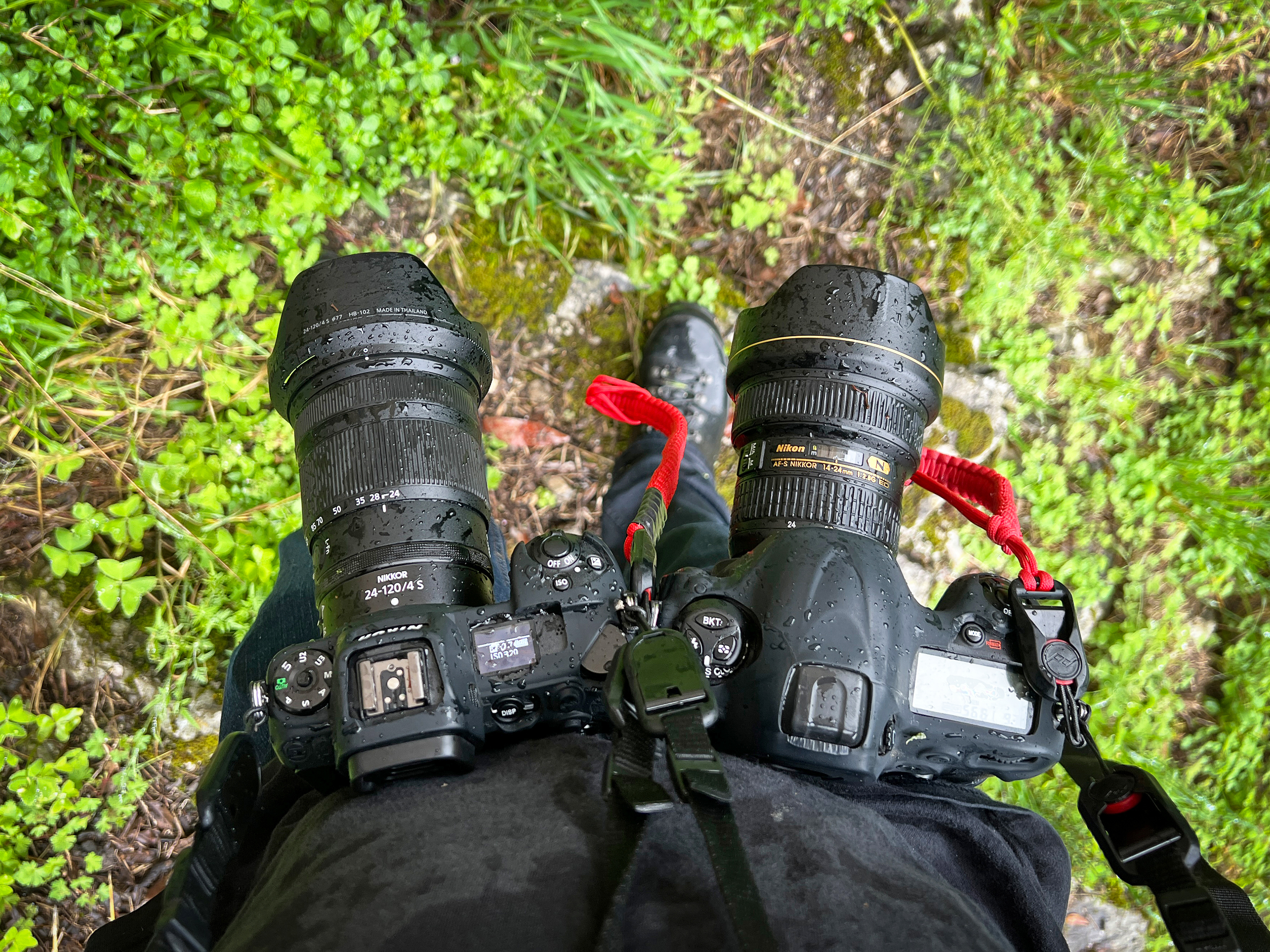
On a Z6II, with lens hood attached (left)

== Sample images ==
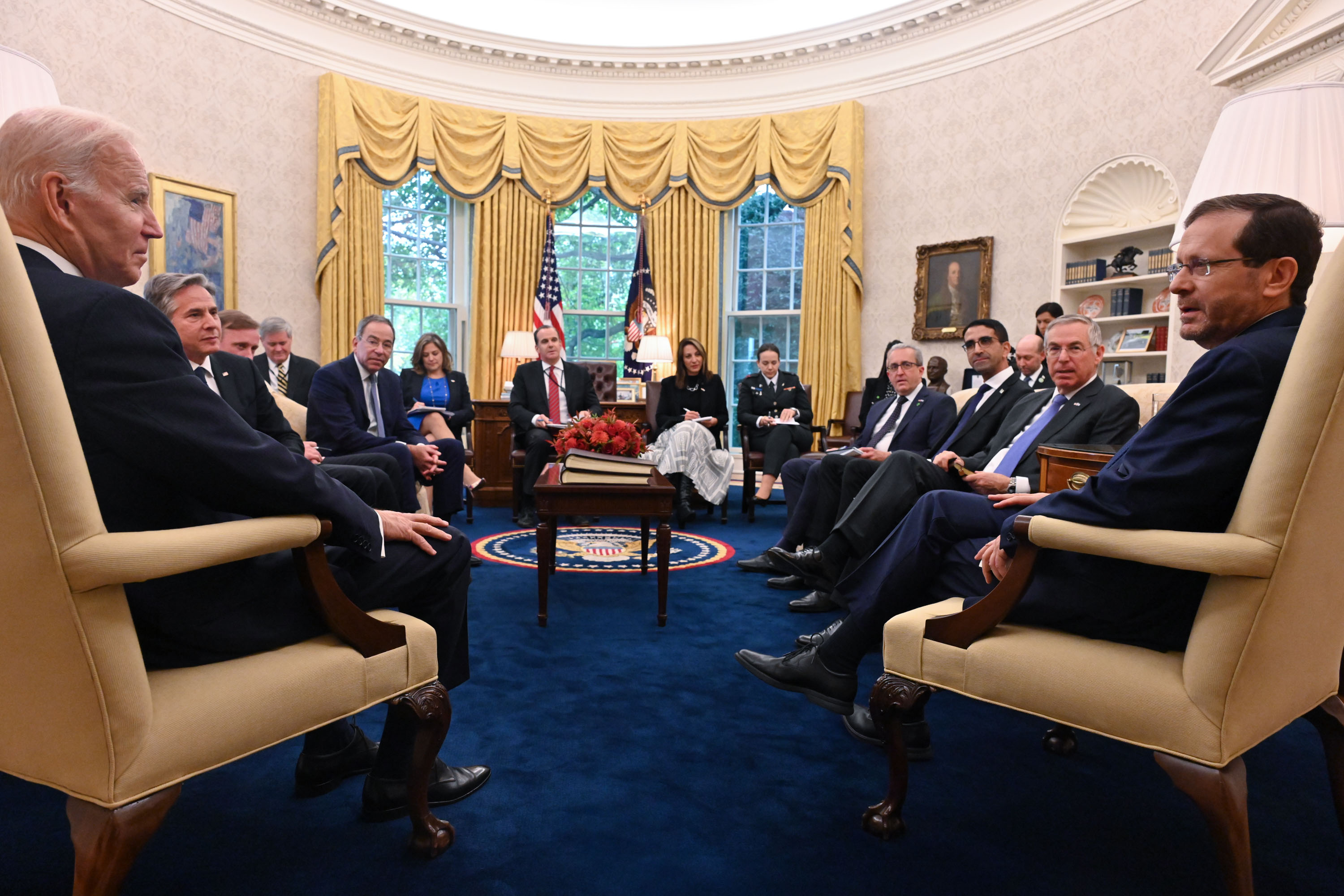
At 24 mm, f/5.6

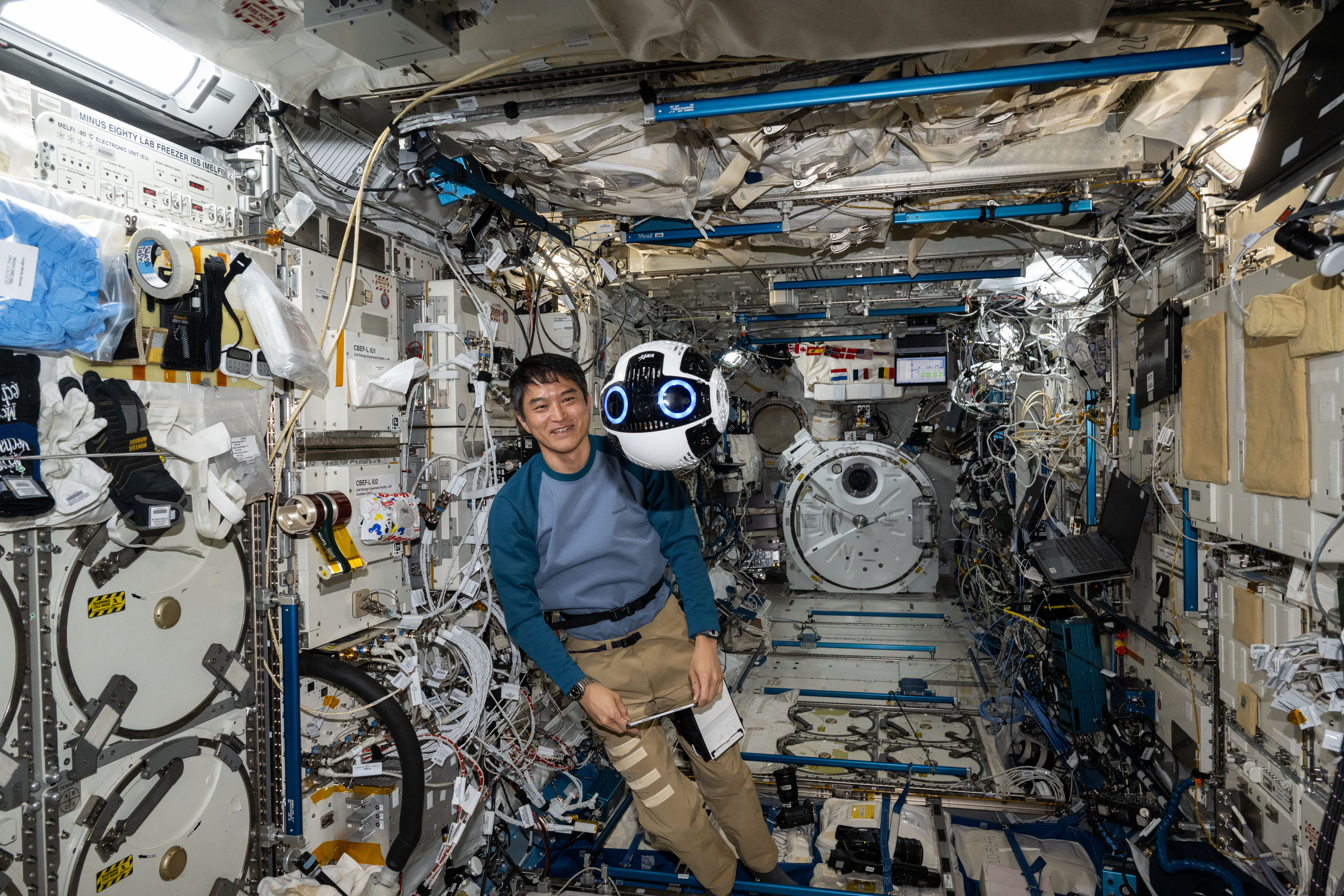
At 24 mm, f/8

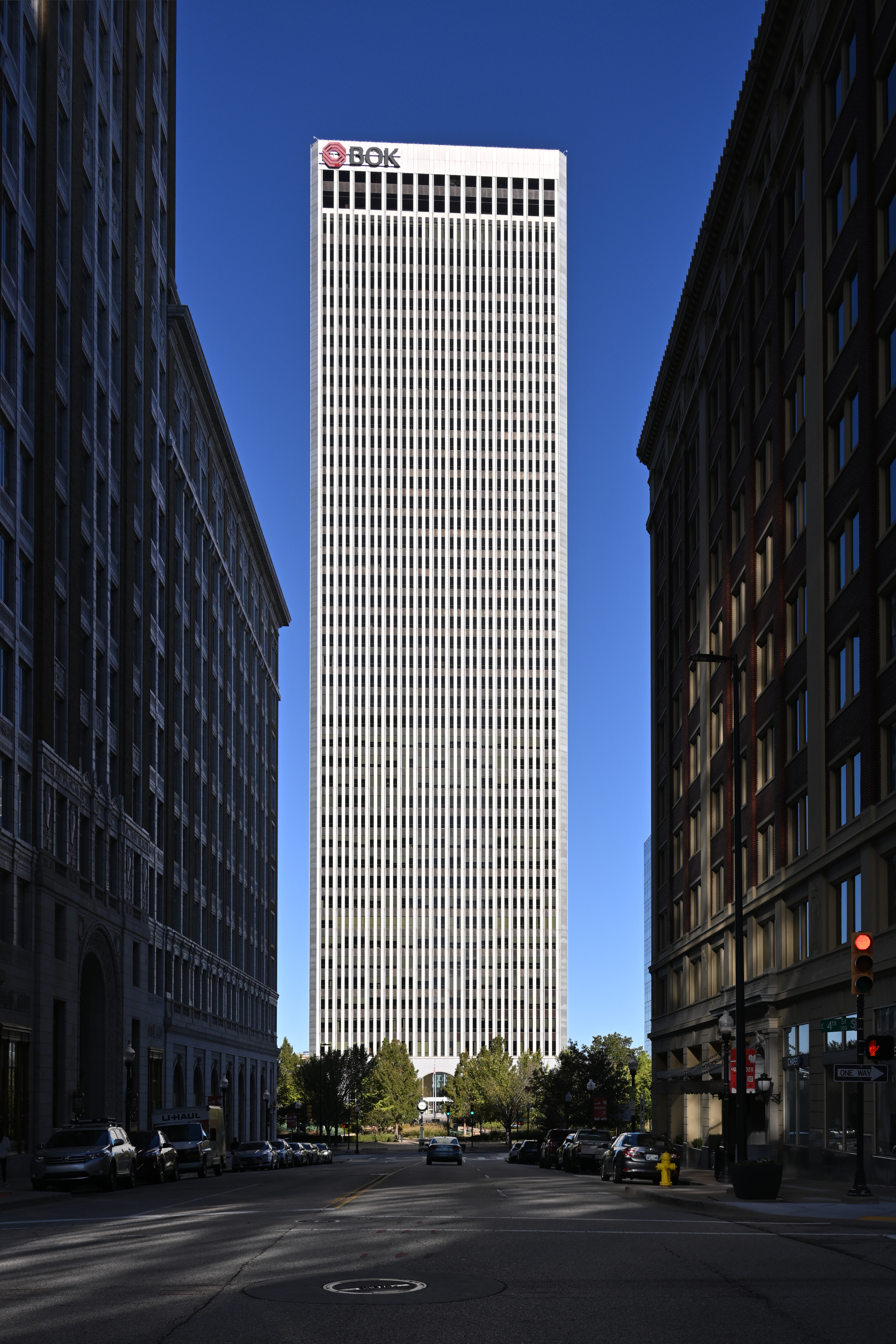
At 24 mm, f/9

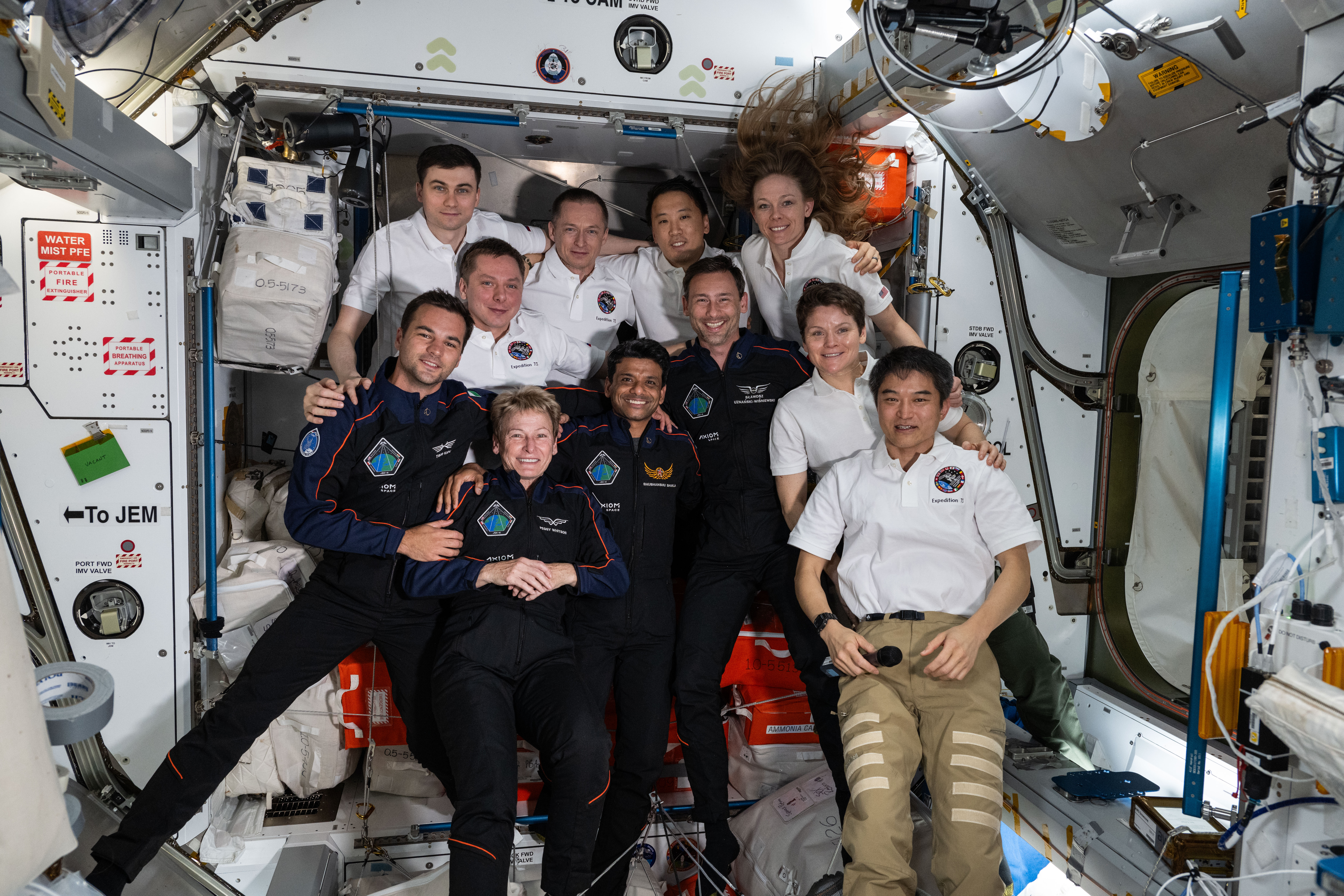
At 26 mm, f/4.5

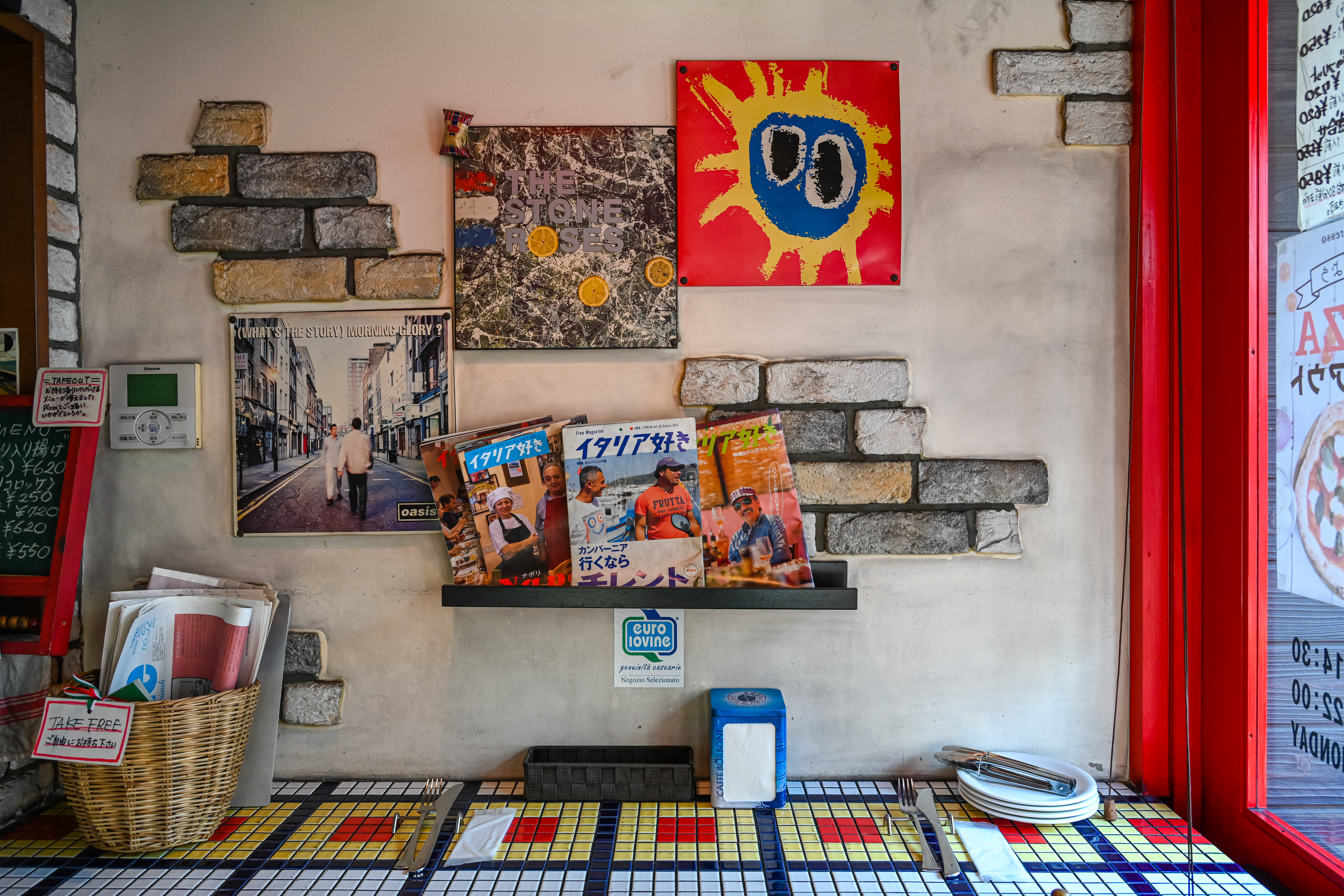
At 27.5 mm, f/4

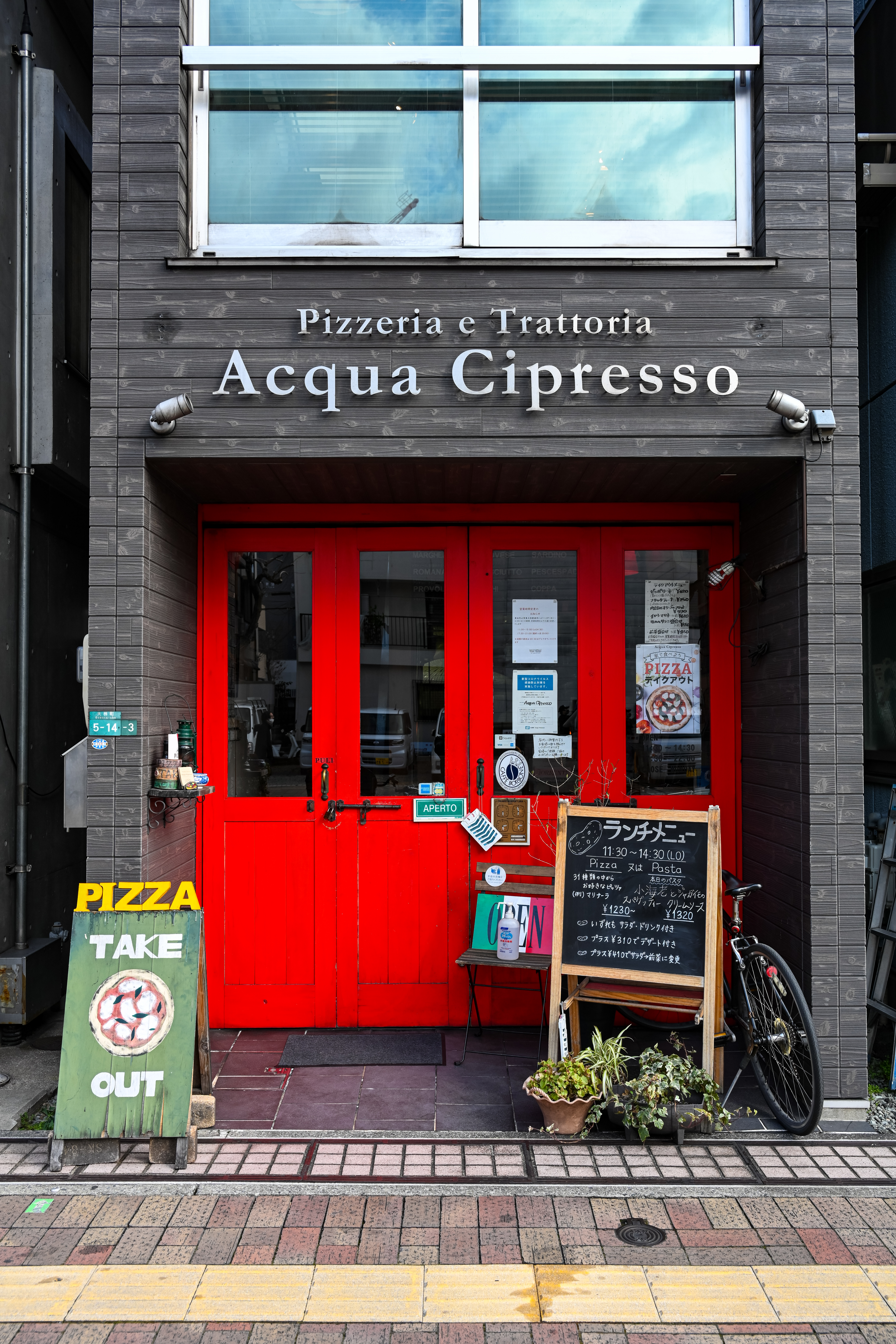
At 33 mm, f/5.6

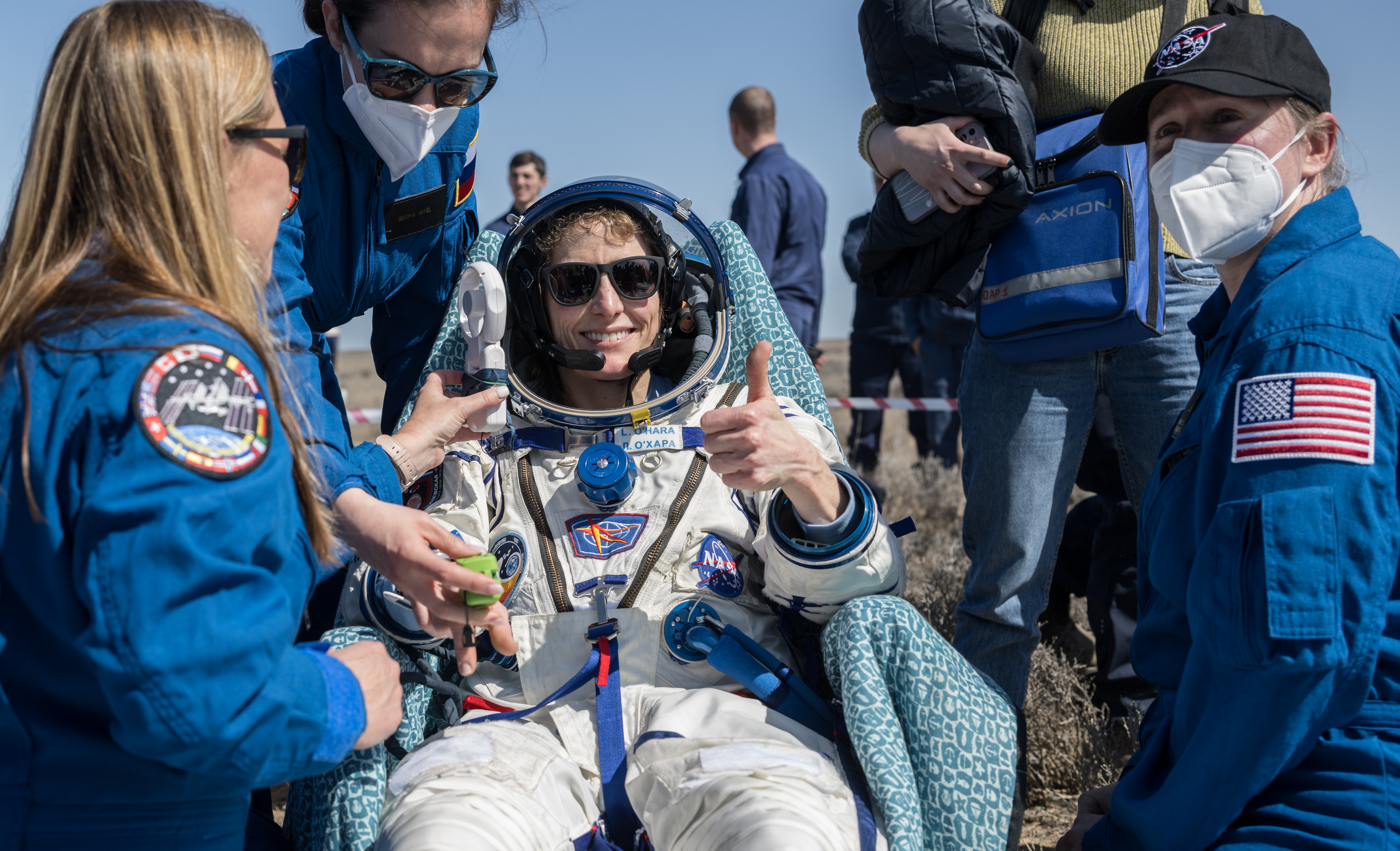
At 37 mm, f/4

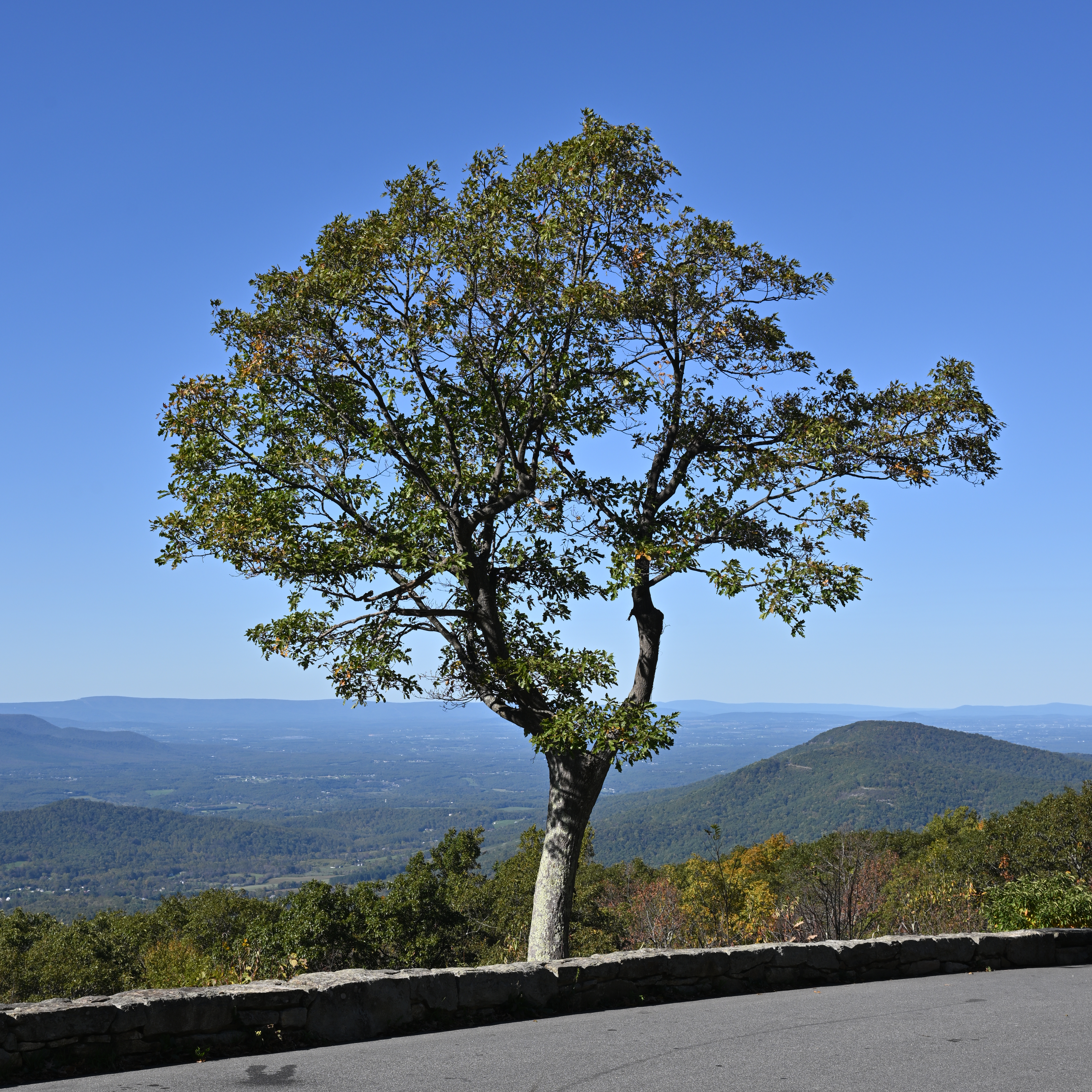
At 37 mm, f/10

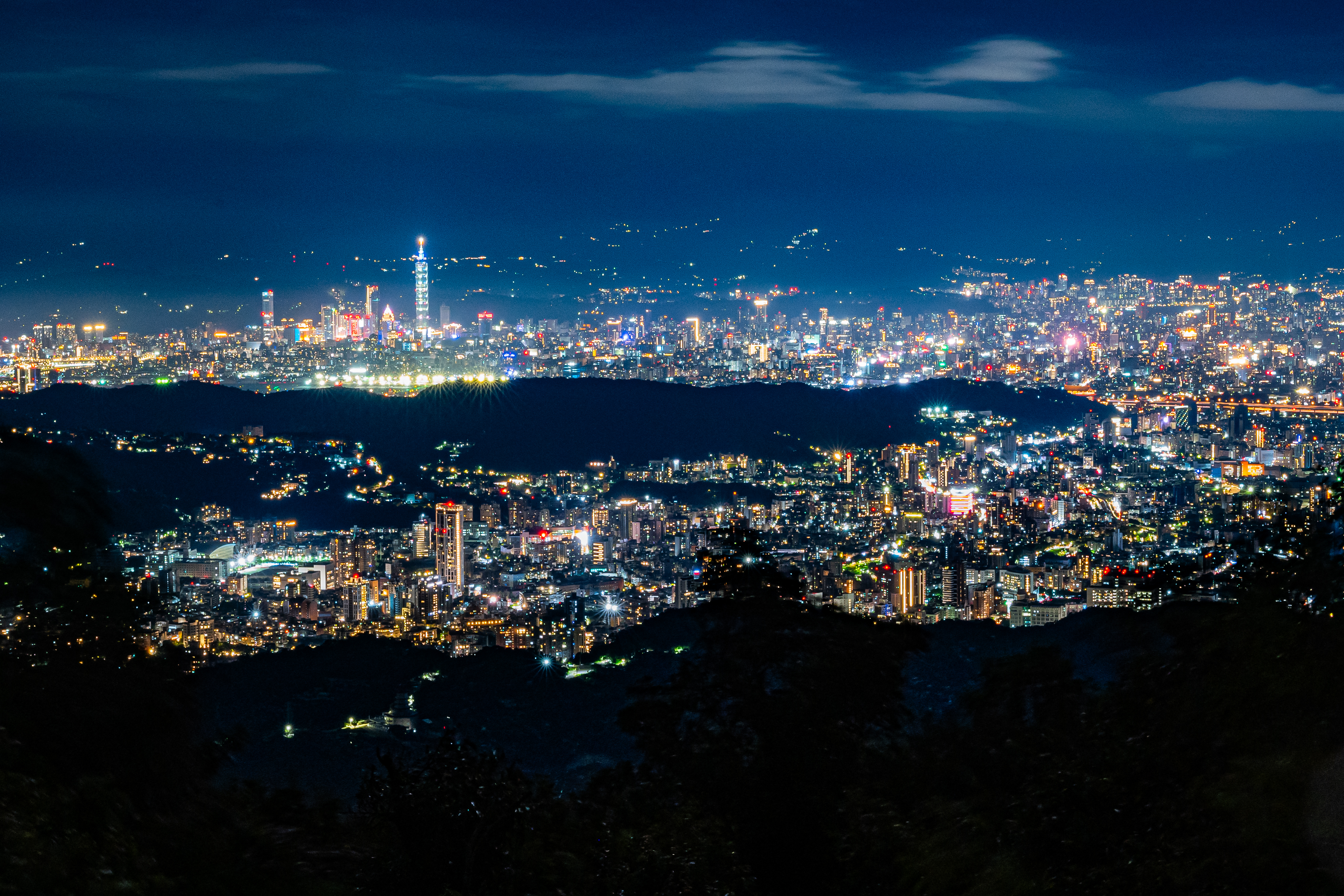
At 50 mm, f/16

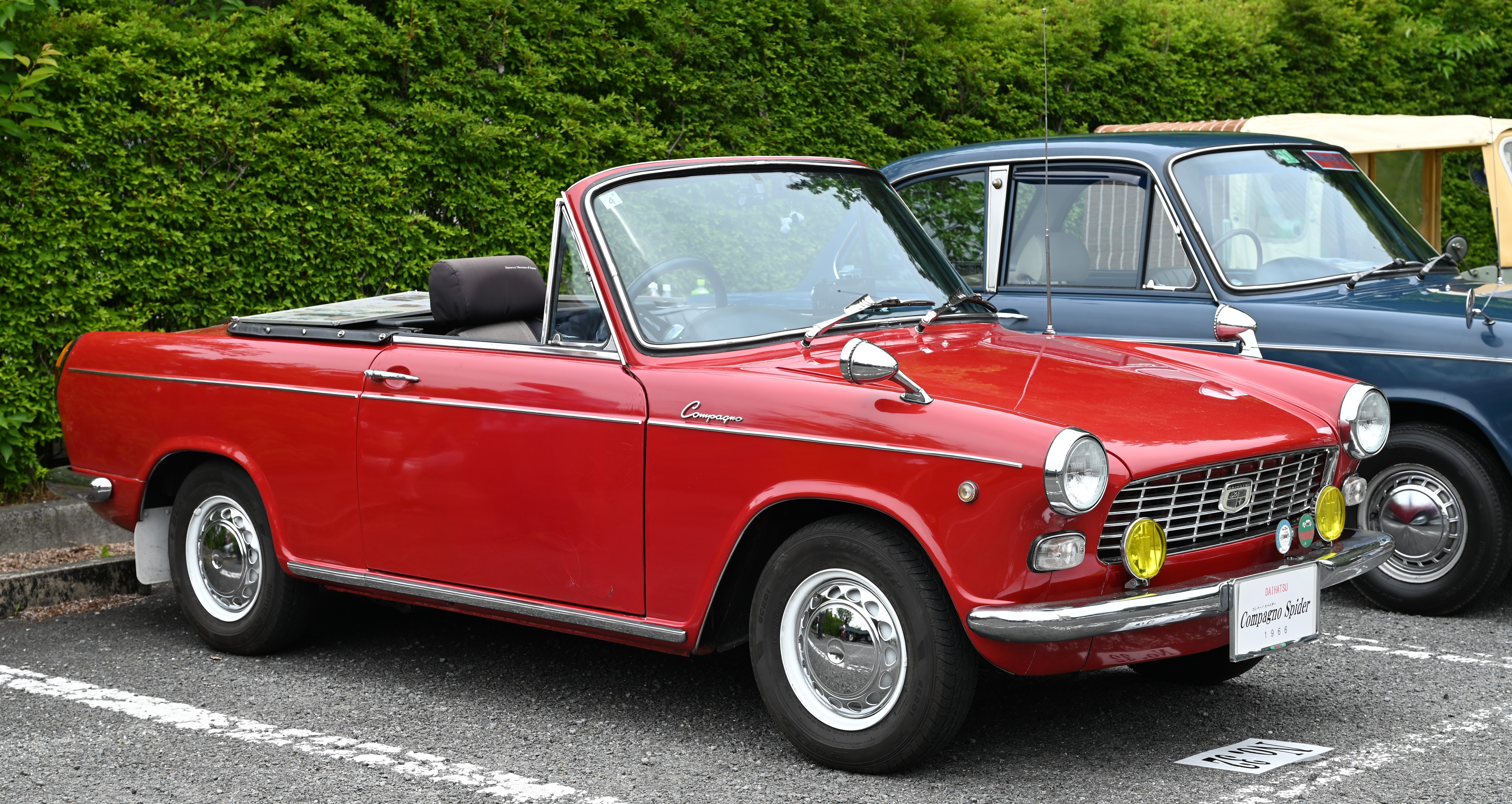
At 54 mm, f/7.1

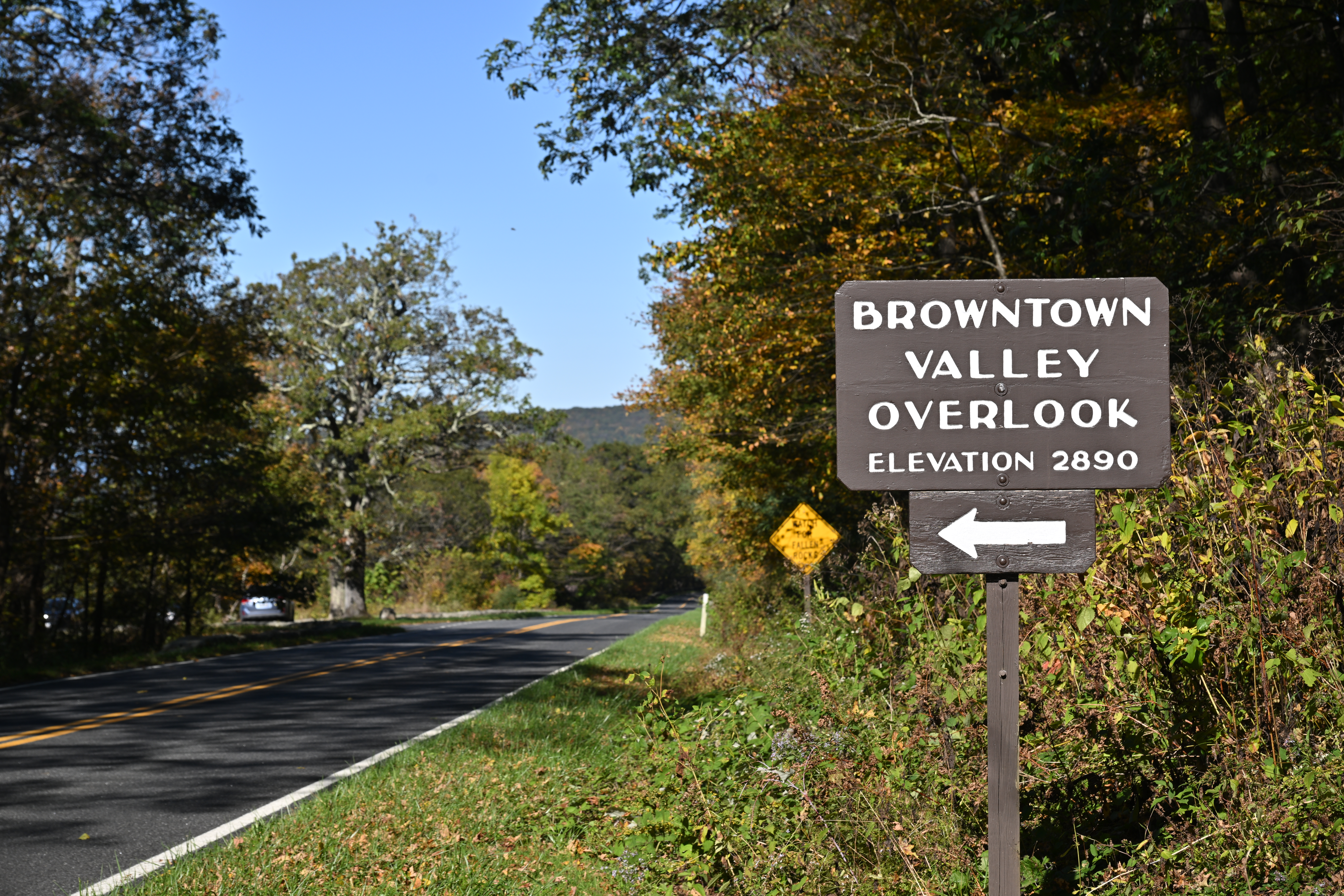
At 71 mm, f/8

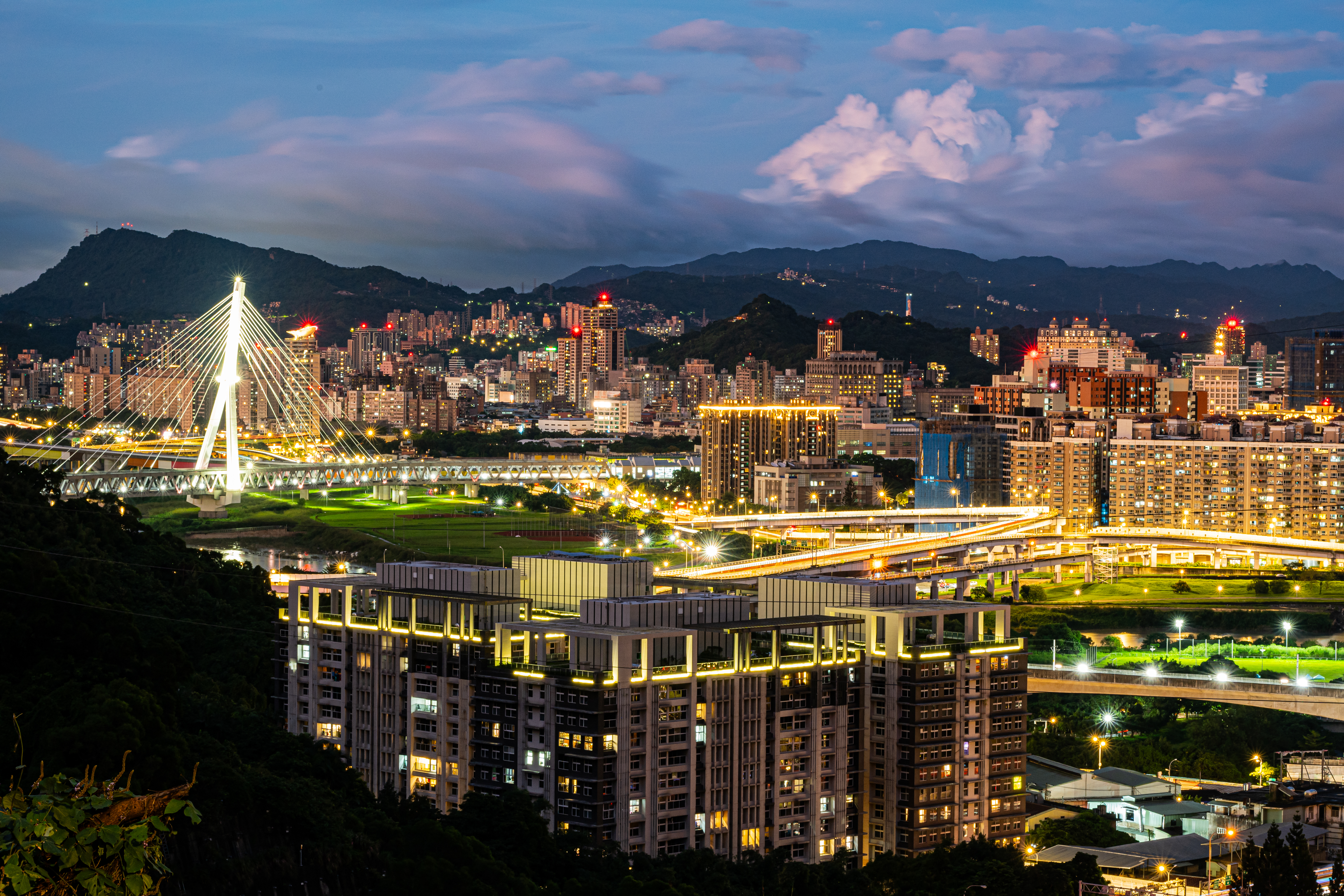
At 84 mm, f/16

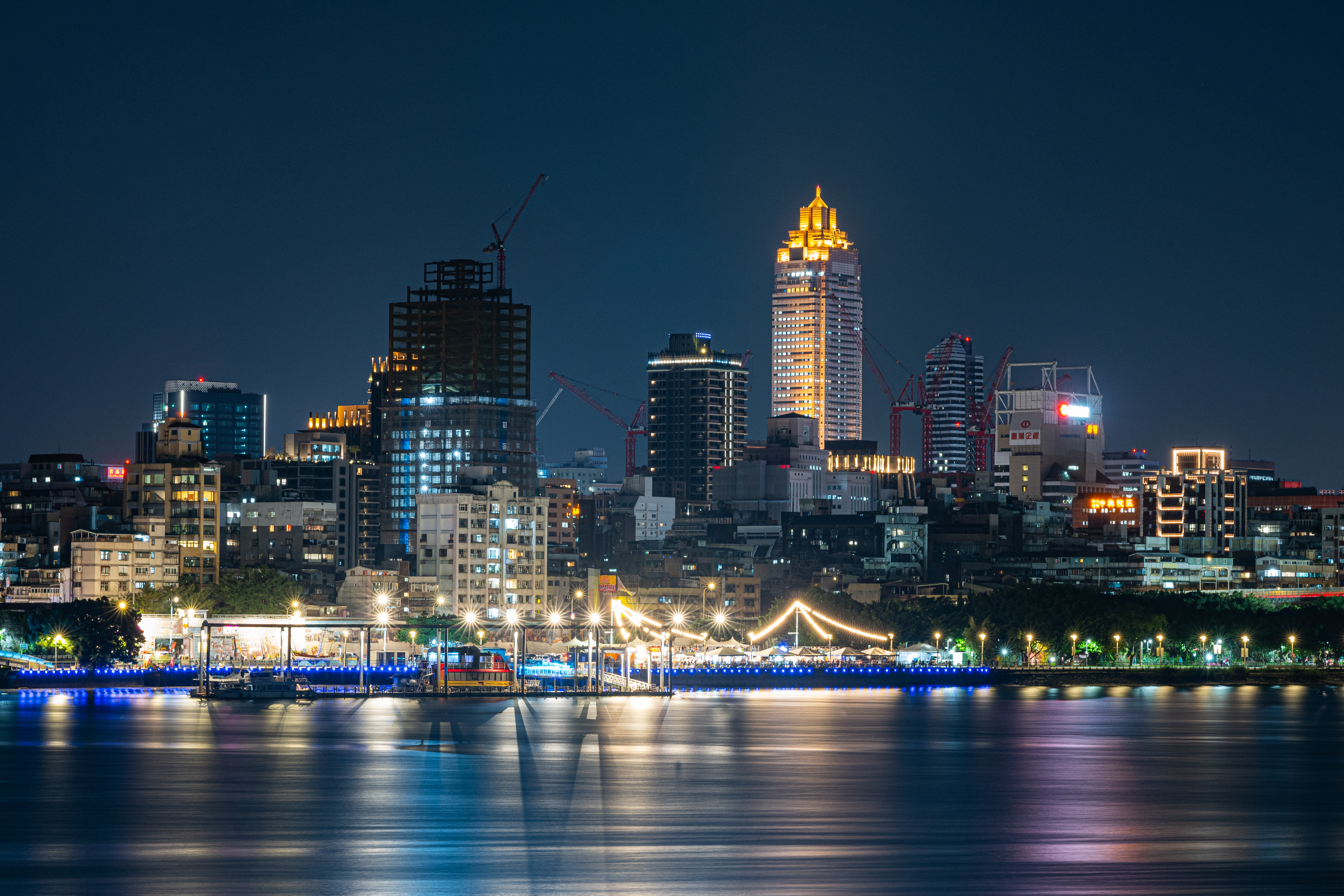
At 92 mm, f/16

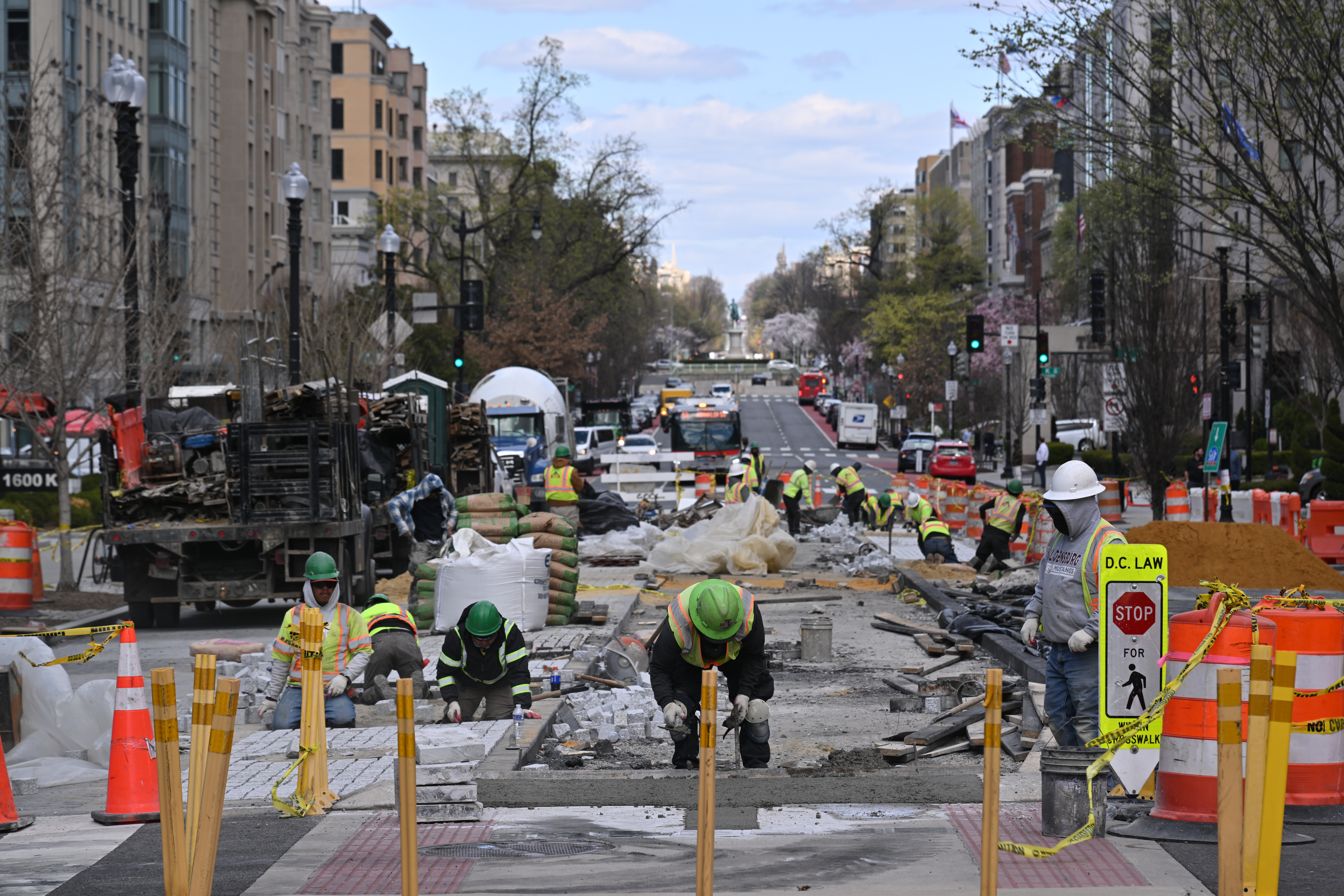
At 120 mm, f/7.1

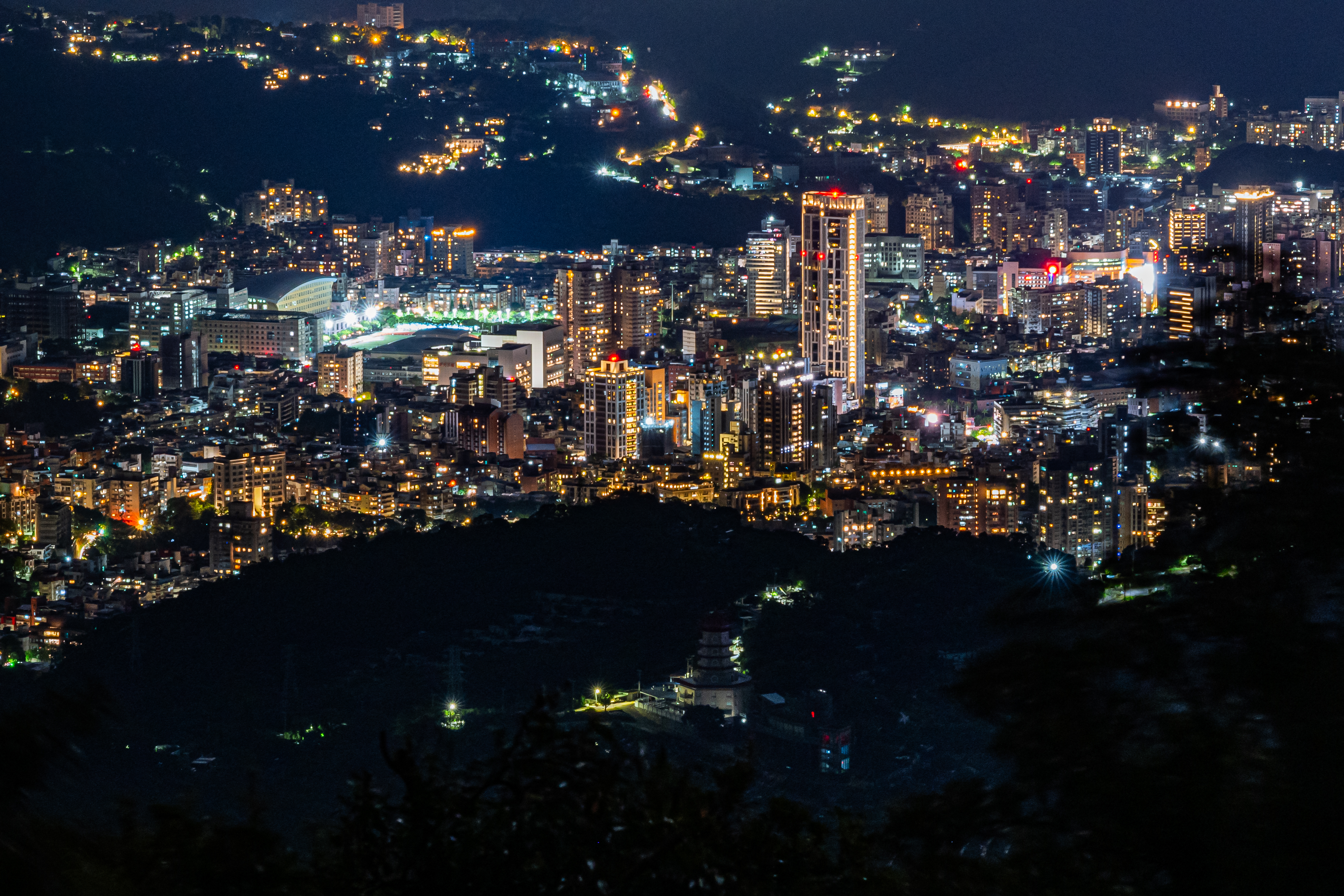
At 120 mm, f/16

== See also ==
- Nikon Z-mount
