= Nikon Nikkor Z 50 mm f/1.4 =

Nikkor Z 50 mm f/1.4
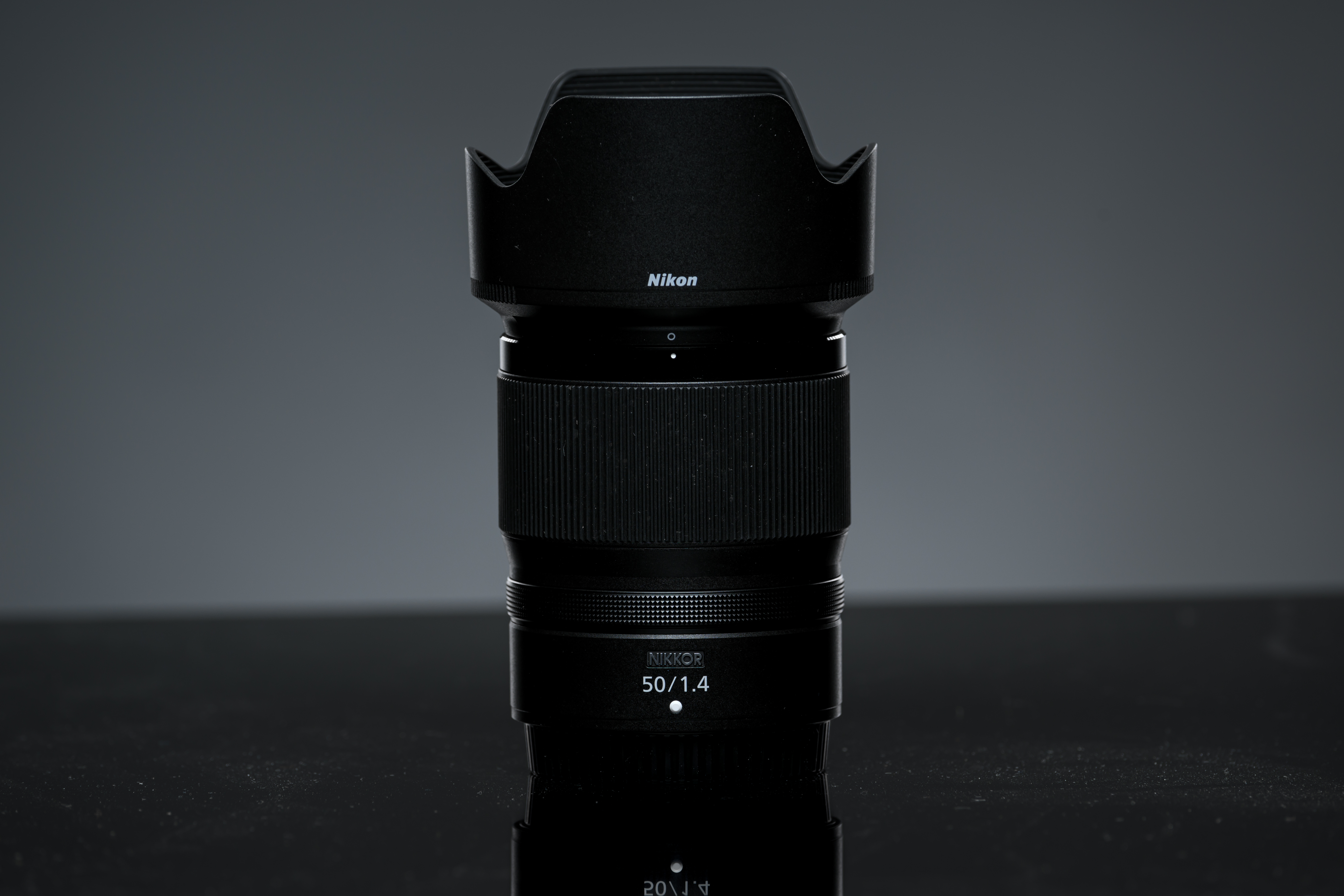
- Maker: Nikon
- Lens mount: Z-mount

Technical data
- Type: Prime
- Focus drive: Stepping motor
- Focal length: 50mm
- Image format: FX (full frame)
- Aperture (max/min): f/1.4–16
- Close focus distance: 0.37m
- Max. magnification: 1:5.9
- Diaphragm blades: 9 (rounded)
- Construction: 10 elements in 7 groups

Features
- Lens-based stabilization: No No
- Macro capable: No No
- Application: Normal Lens

Physical
- Max. length: 86.5 mm
- Diameter: 74.5 mm
- Weight: 420 g
- Filter diameter: 62 mm

Software
- Lens ID: 52

Accessories
- Lens hood: HB-115 (bayonet)

Angle of view
- Diagonal: 47° (FX); 31°30' (DX)

History
- Introduction: September 2024

Retail info
- MSRP: 499 USD (as of 2024)

The Nikon Nikkor Z 50 mm f/1.4 is a full-frame standard prime lens manufactured by Nikon for use on Nikon Z-mount mirrorless cameras.

== Introduction ==
The lens was introduced on September 10, 2024. It is the third 50 mm Nikkor lens released for Z-mount, placing it between the Nikkor Z 50 mm f/1.2 S and f/1.8 S premium lenses in terms of aperture, but with a much affordable price tag. The lens comes with a bayonet-type lens hood (HB-115).

== Features ==
- 50 mm focal length (approximately equivalent field of view of a 75 mm lens when used on a DX format camera)
- Autofocus using a stepping motor (STM), dedicated focus-by-wire manual focus ring
- 10 elements in 7 groups (including an aspherical lens element)
- 9-blade rounded diaphragm
- Internal focusing (IF lens)
- One customizable control ring at the back (aperture, ISO and exposure compensation functions can be assigned to it)

== Awards ==
The lens was awarded with the EISA Best Buy Lens 2025-2026 award.

== Sample images ==
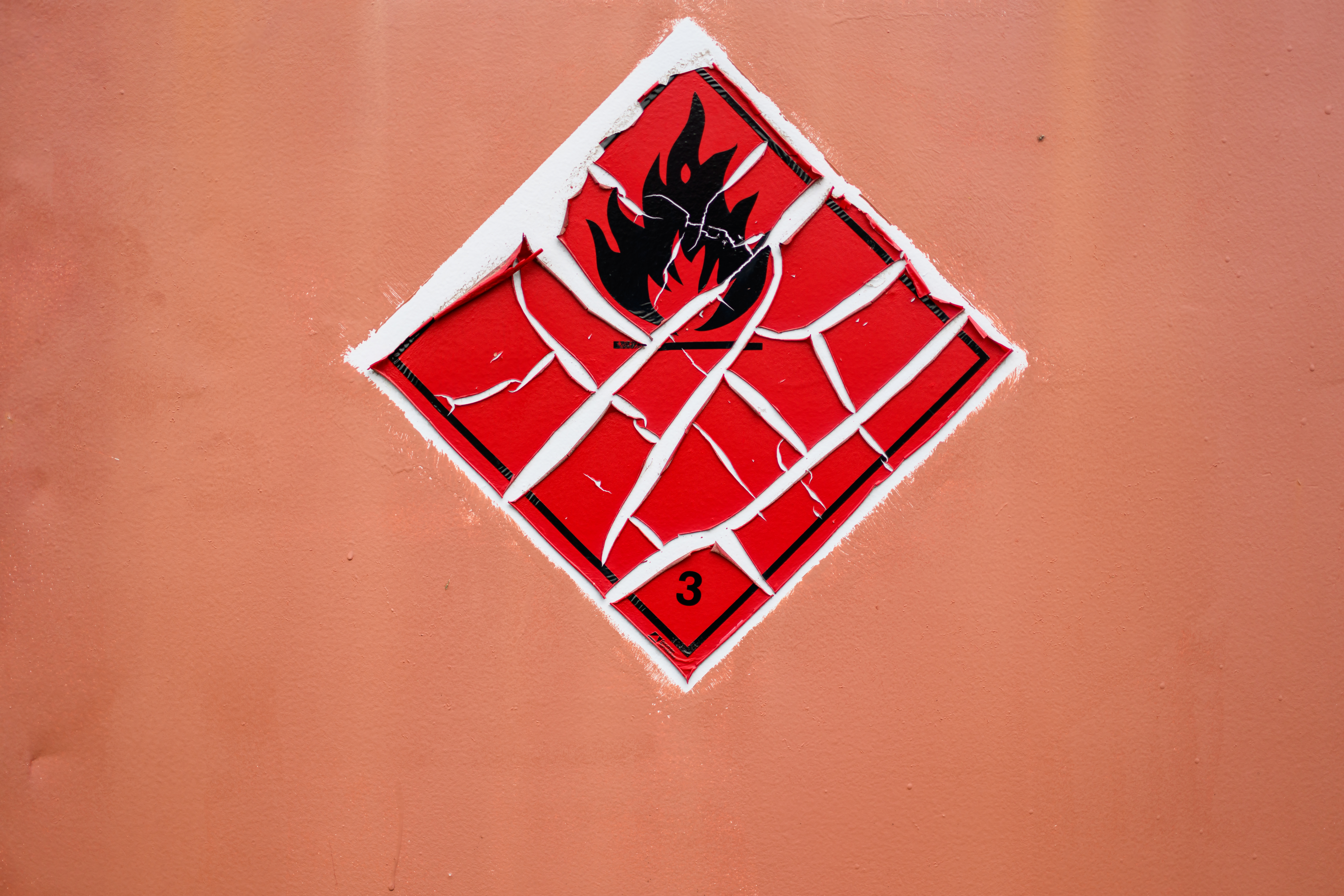
At f/1.4

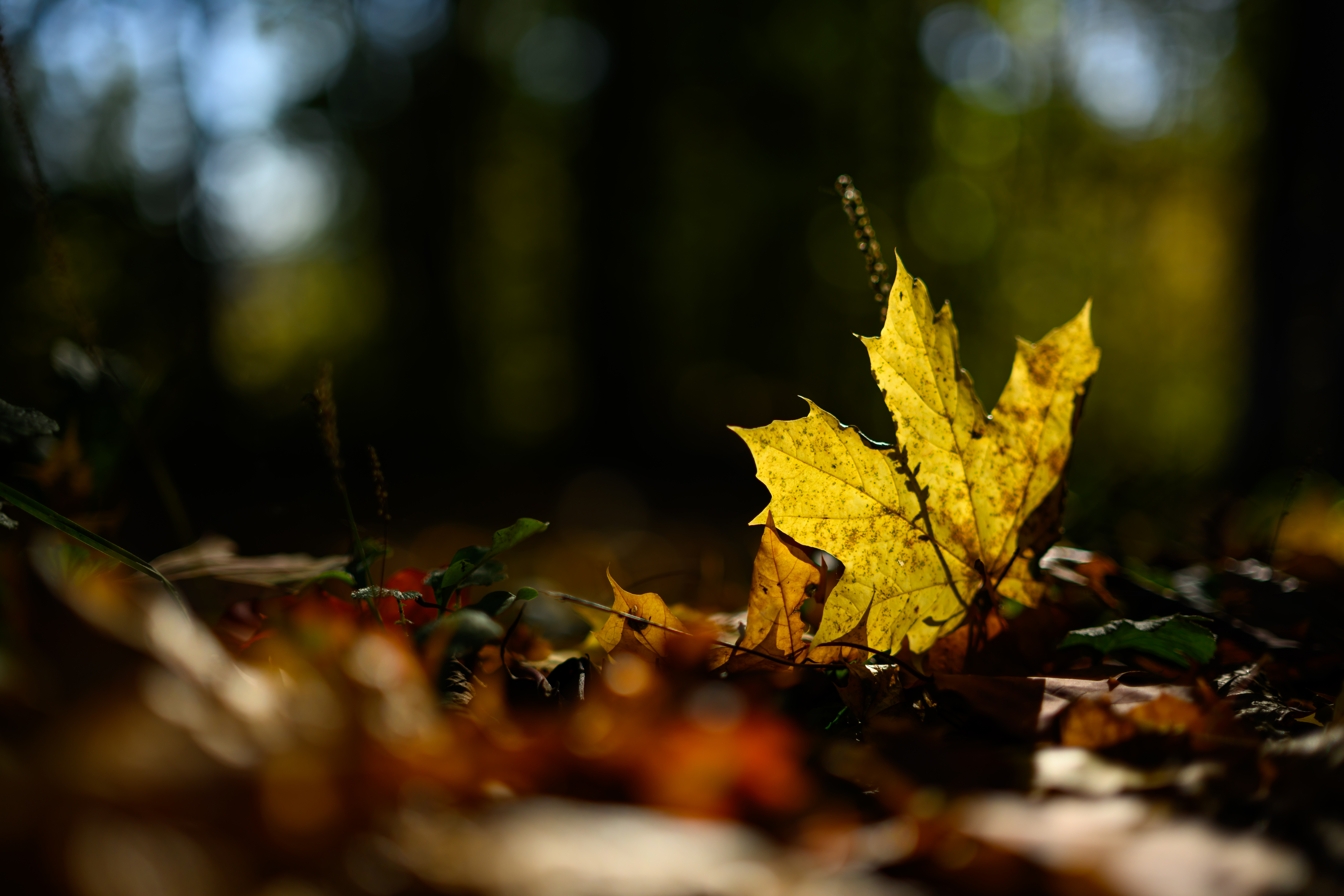
At f/1.4

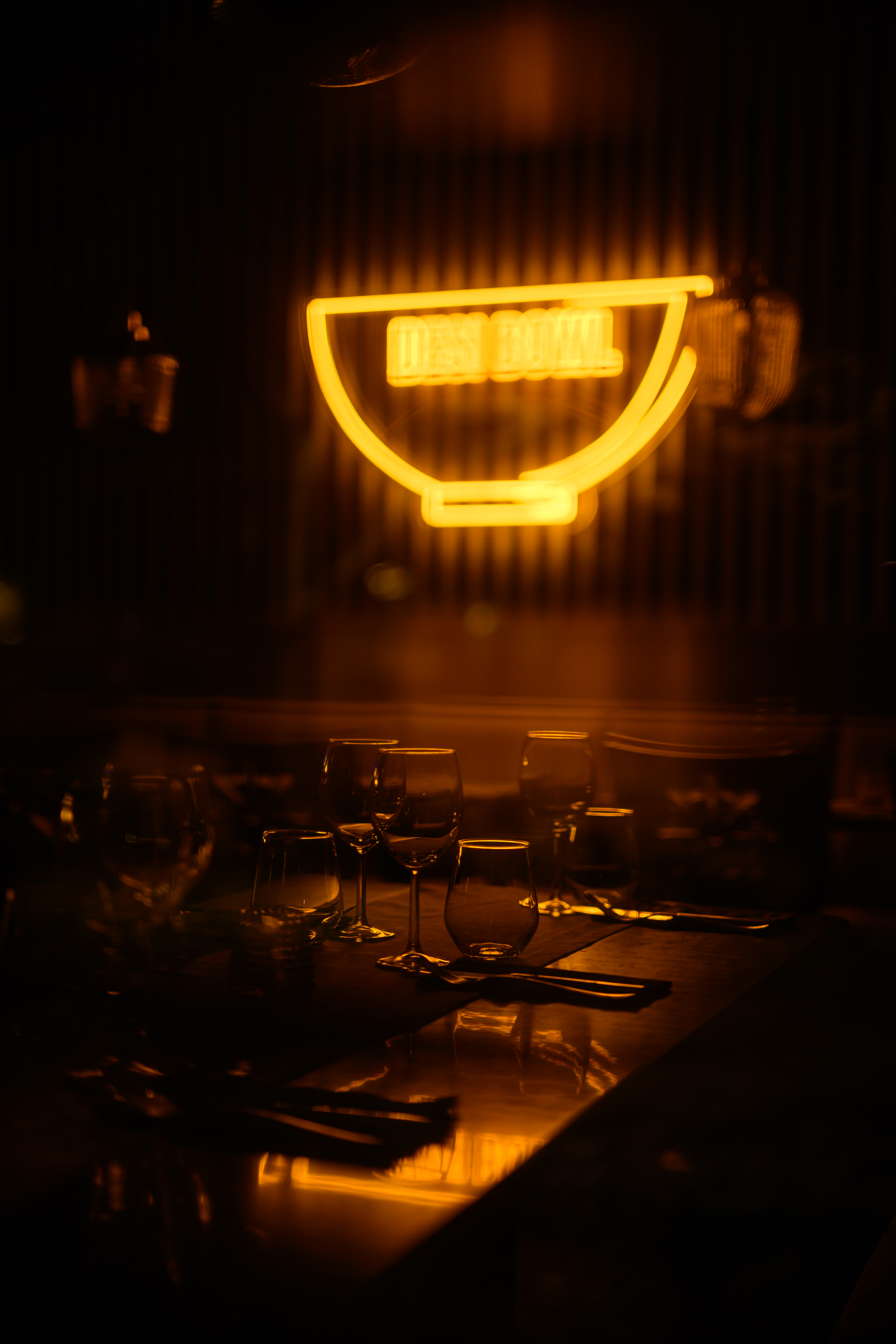
At f/1.4

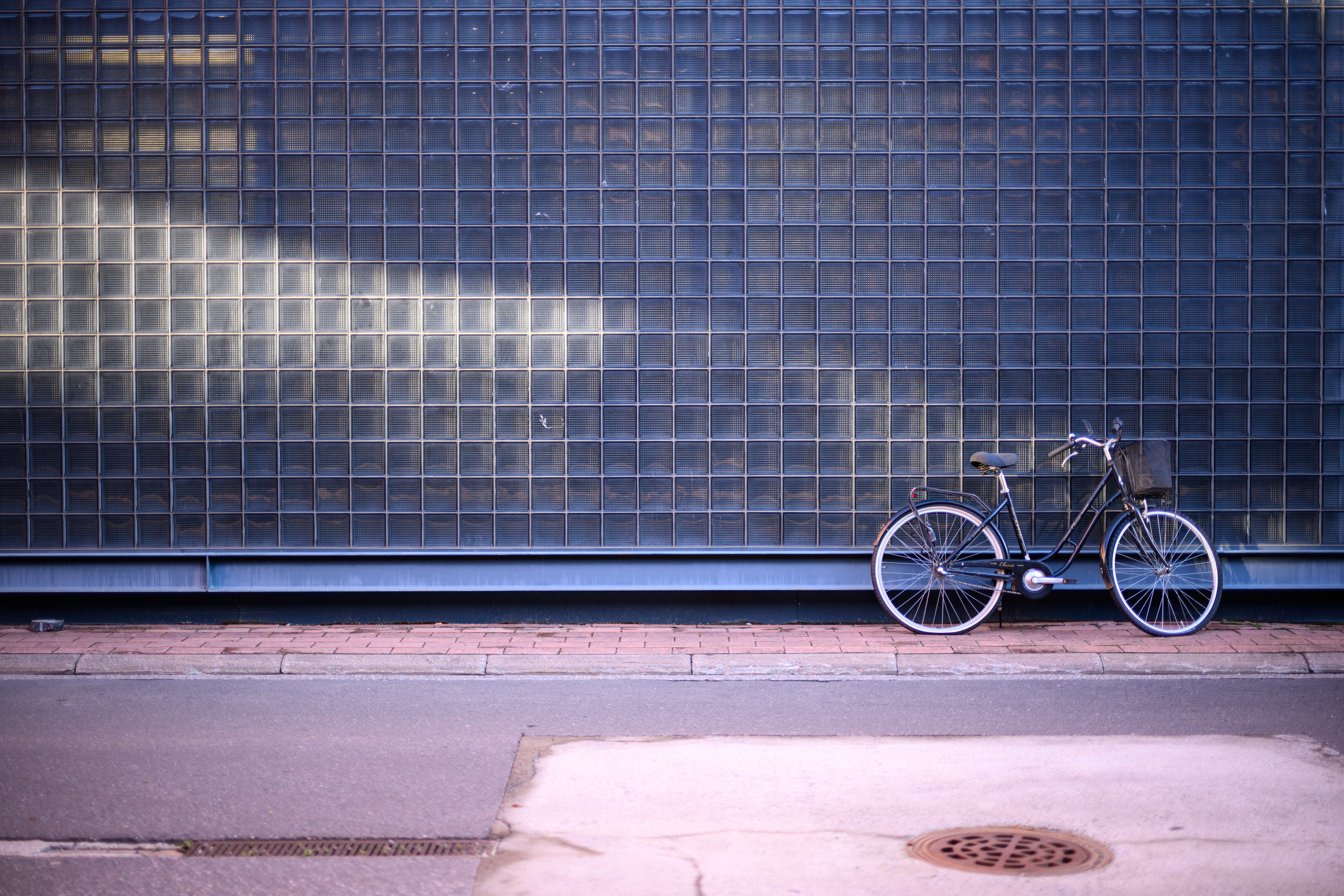
At f/1.4

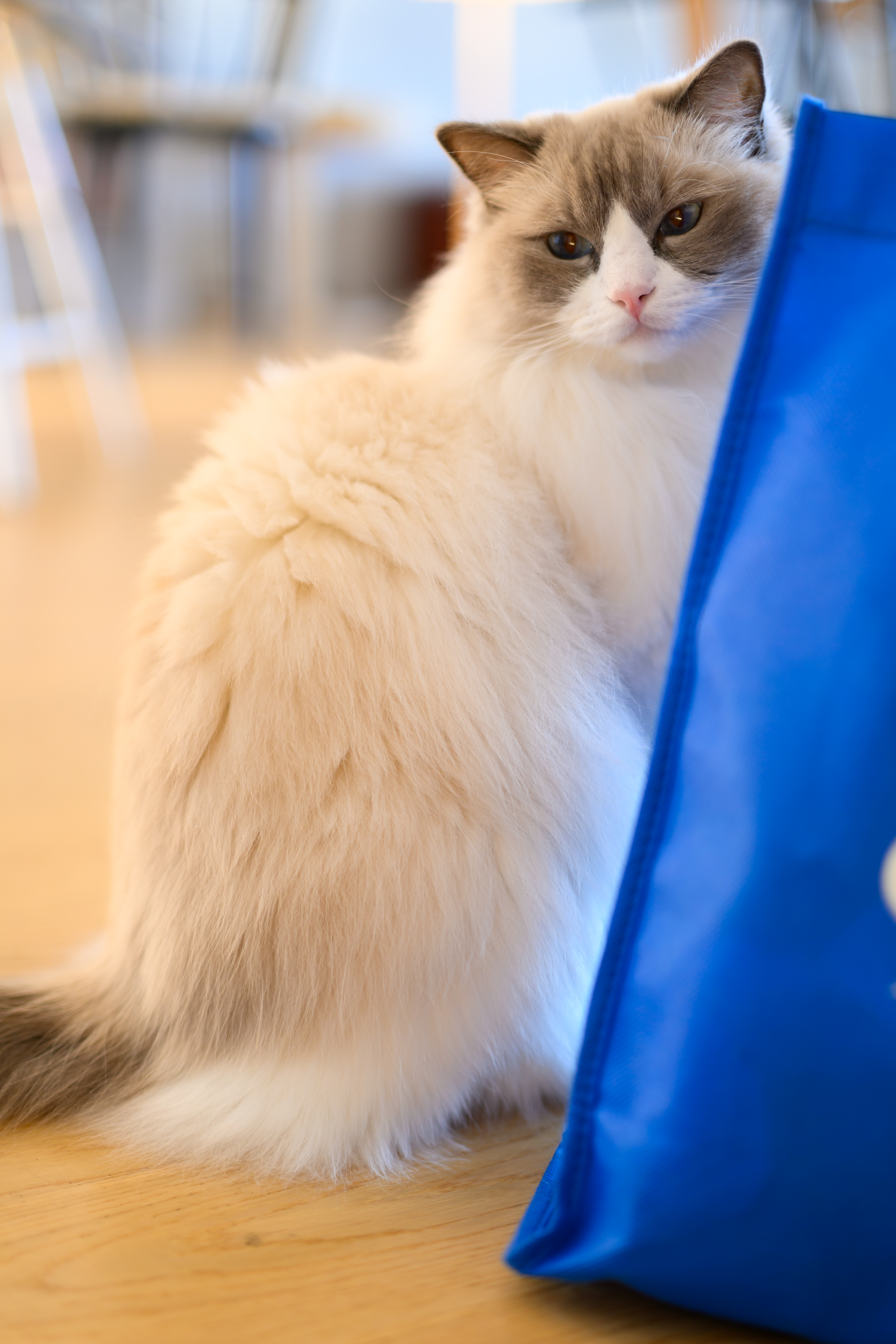
At f/1.4

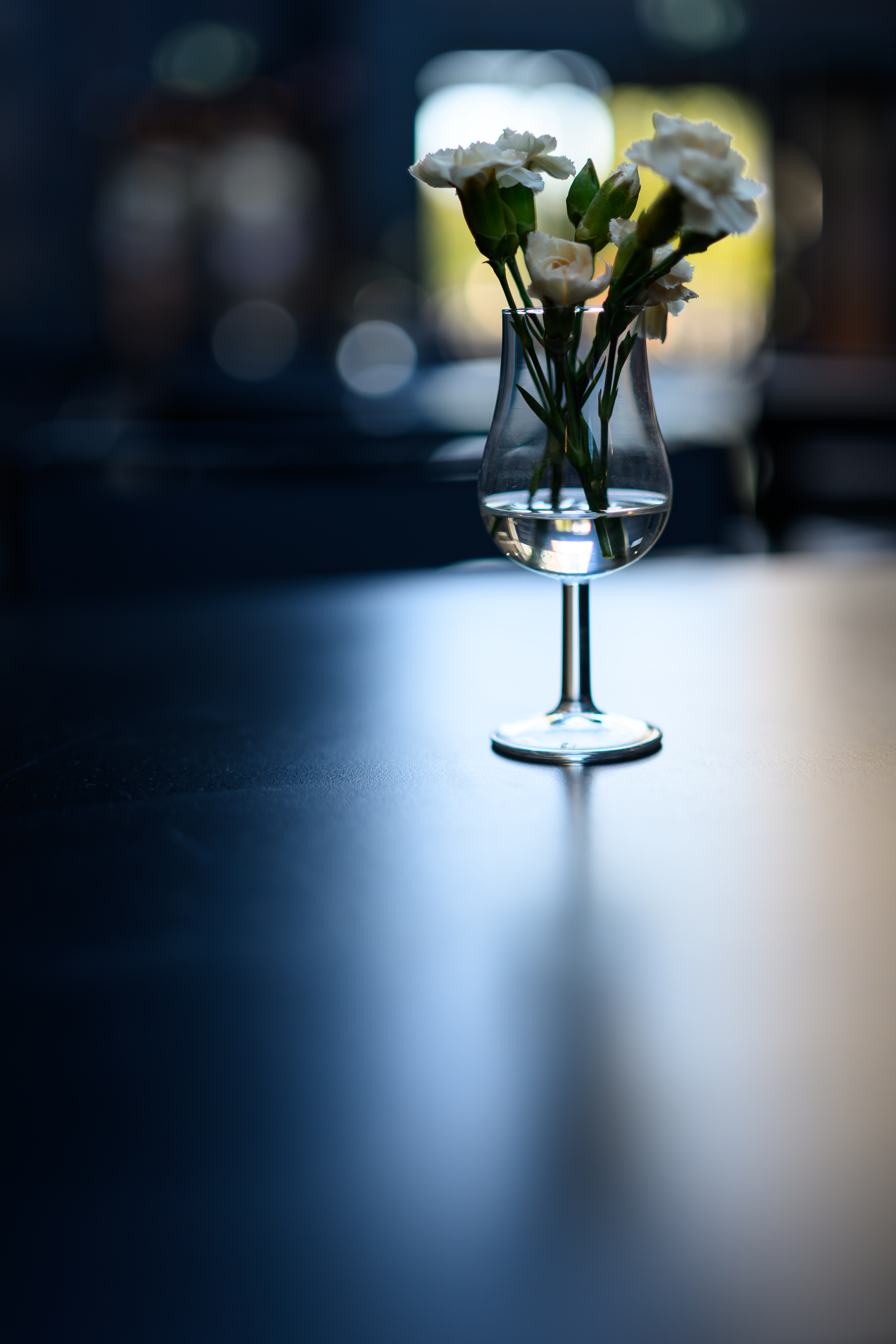
At f/1.4

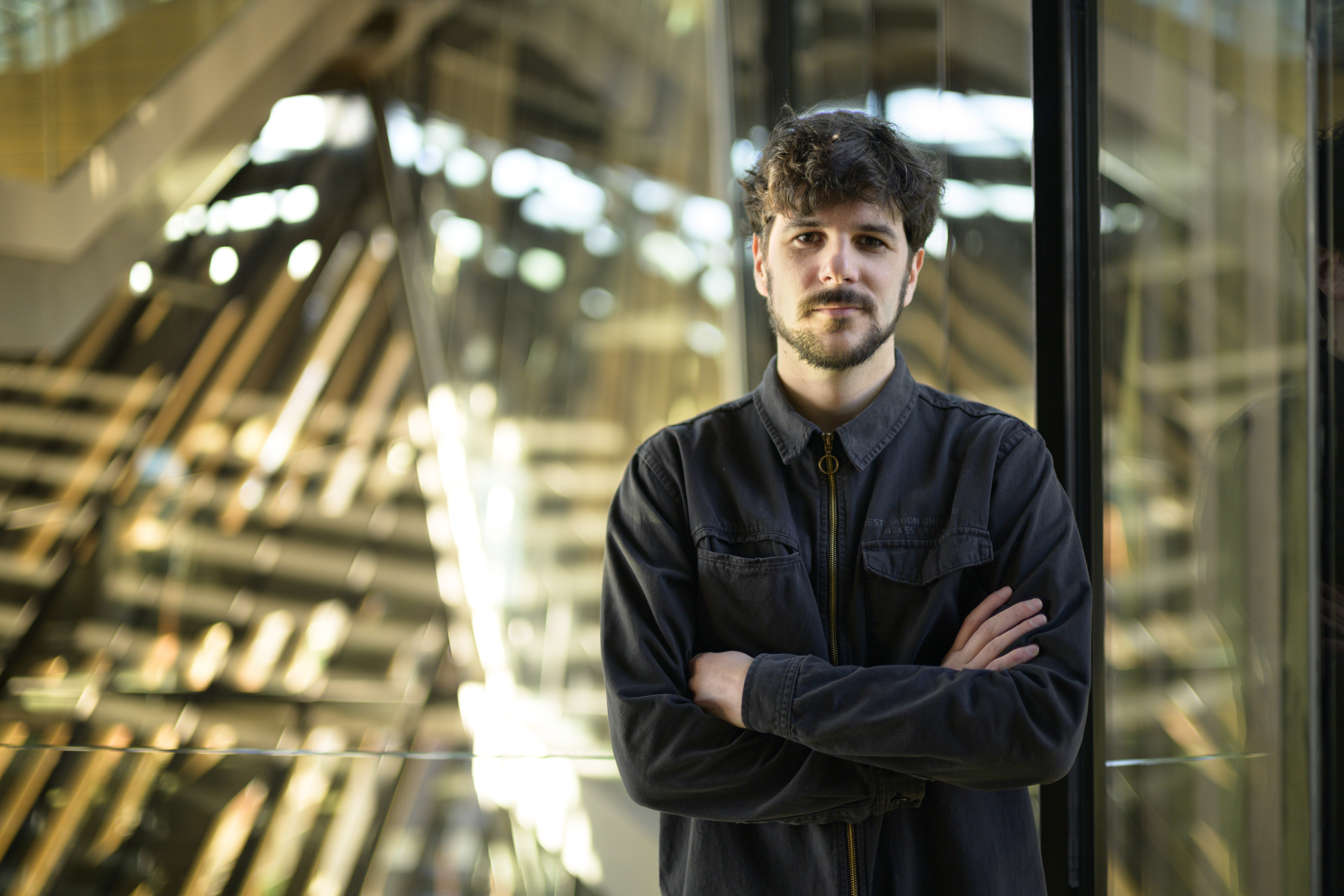
At f/1.4

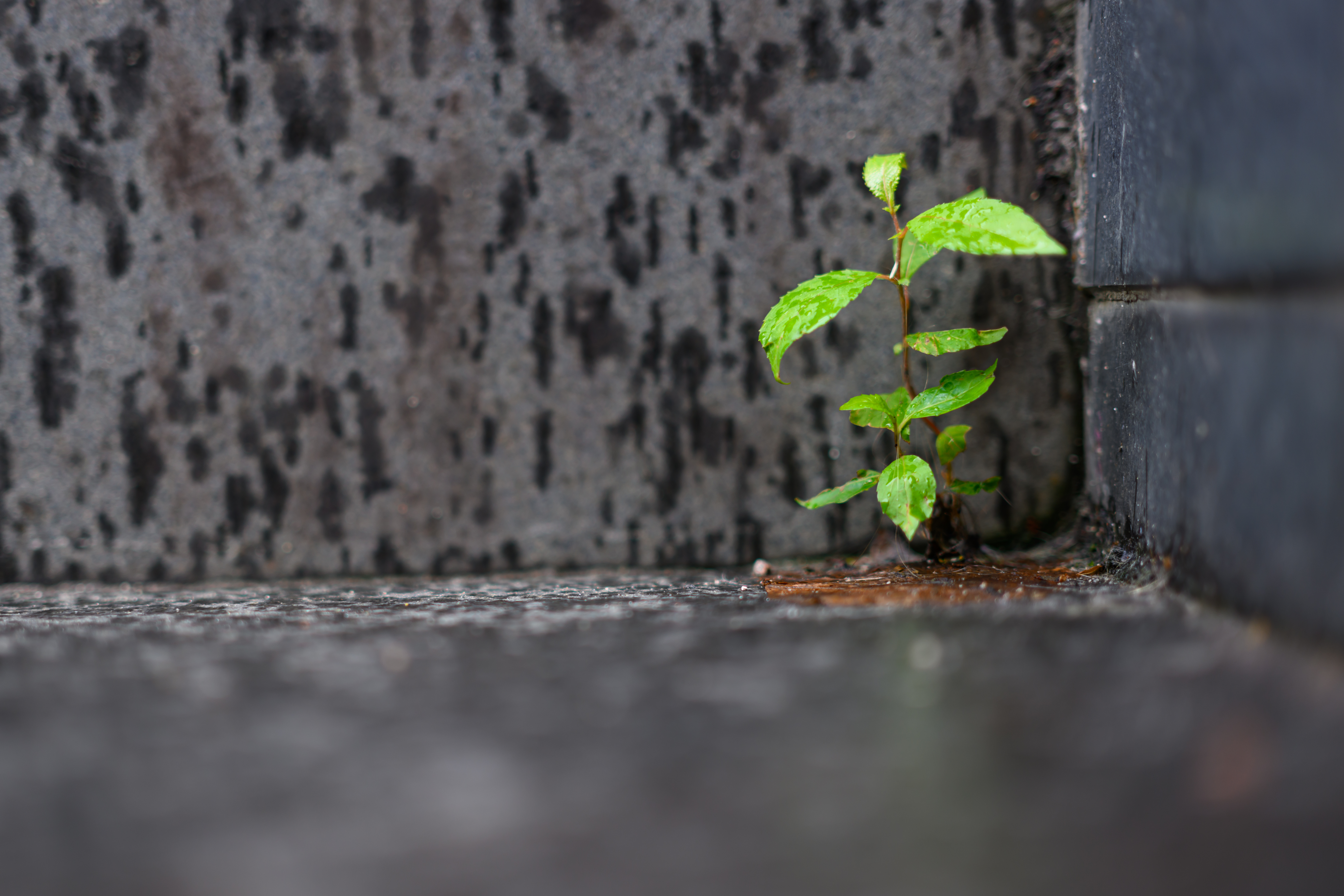
At f/1.4

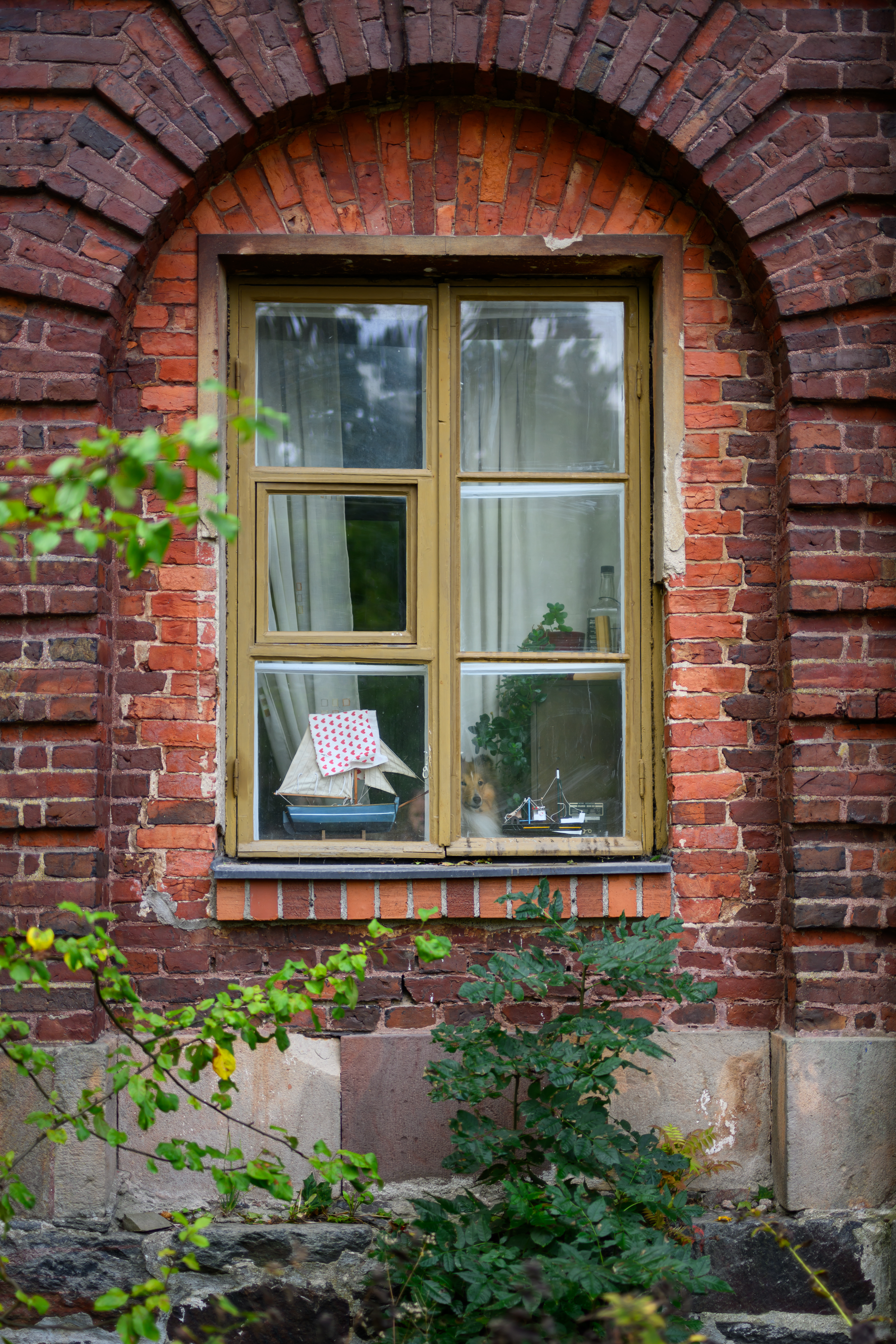
At f/1.4

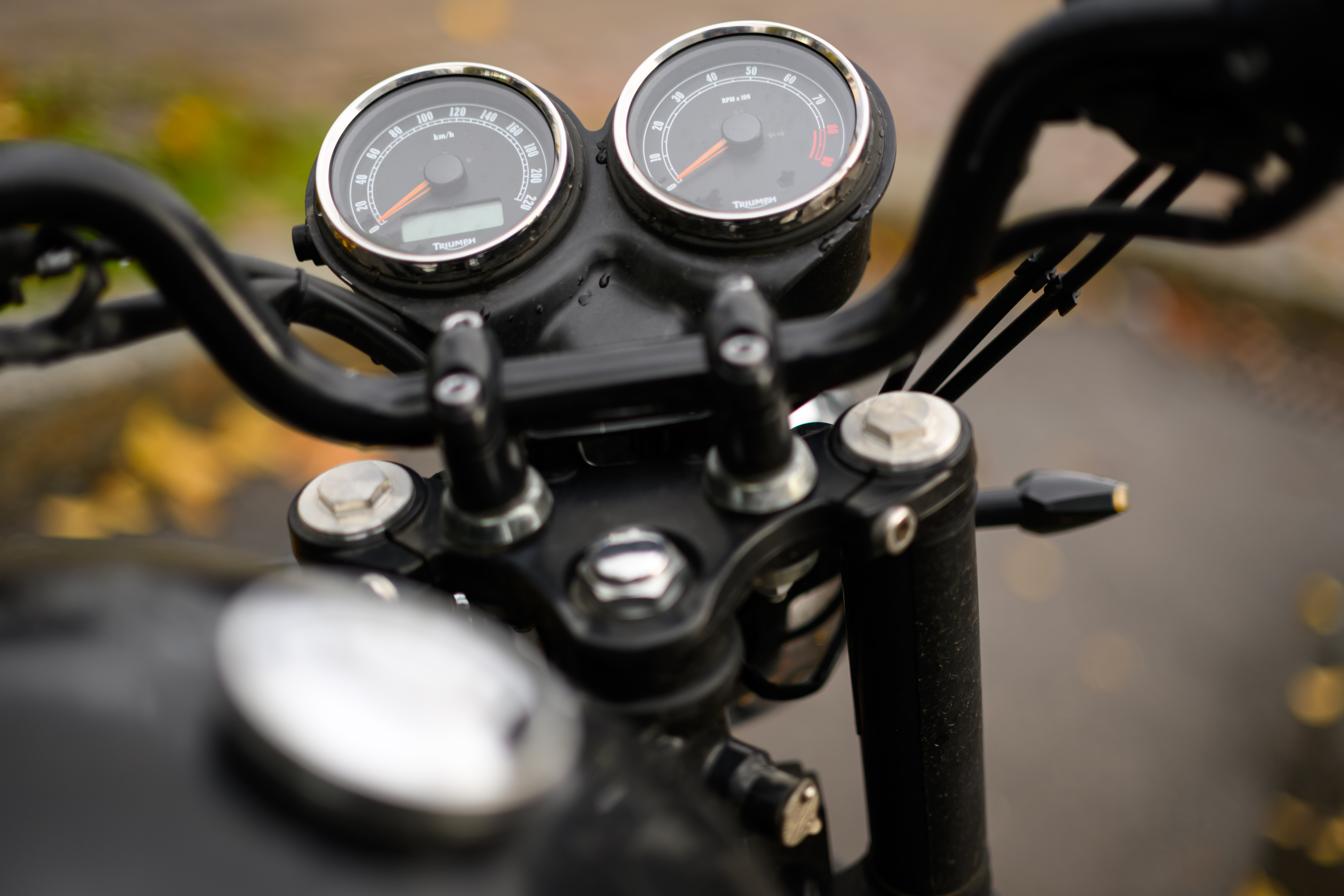
At f/1.4

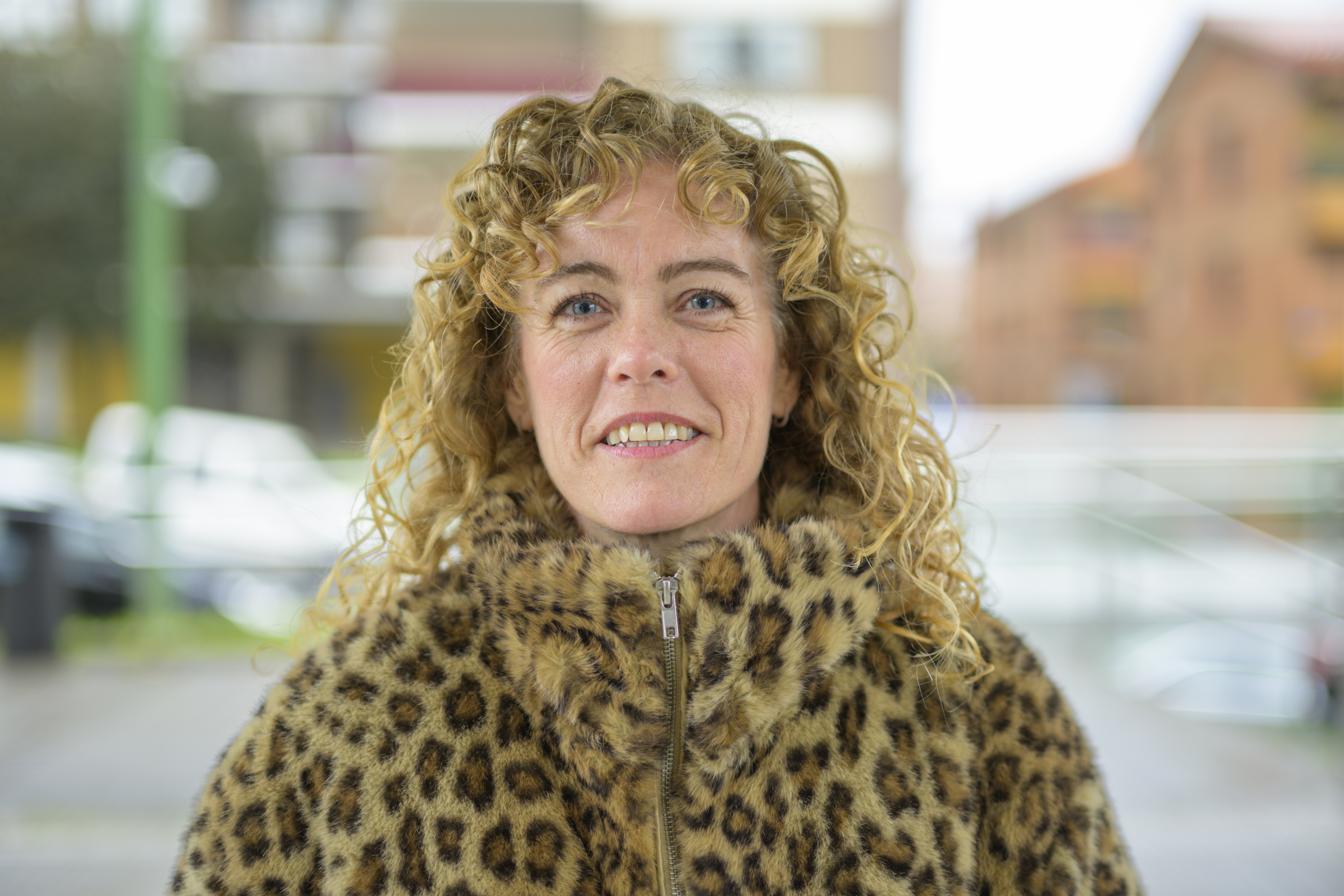
At f/1.4

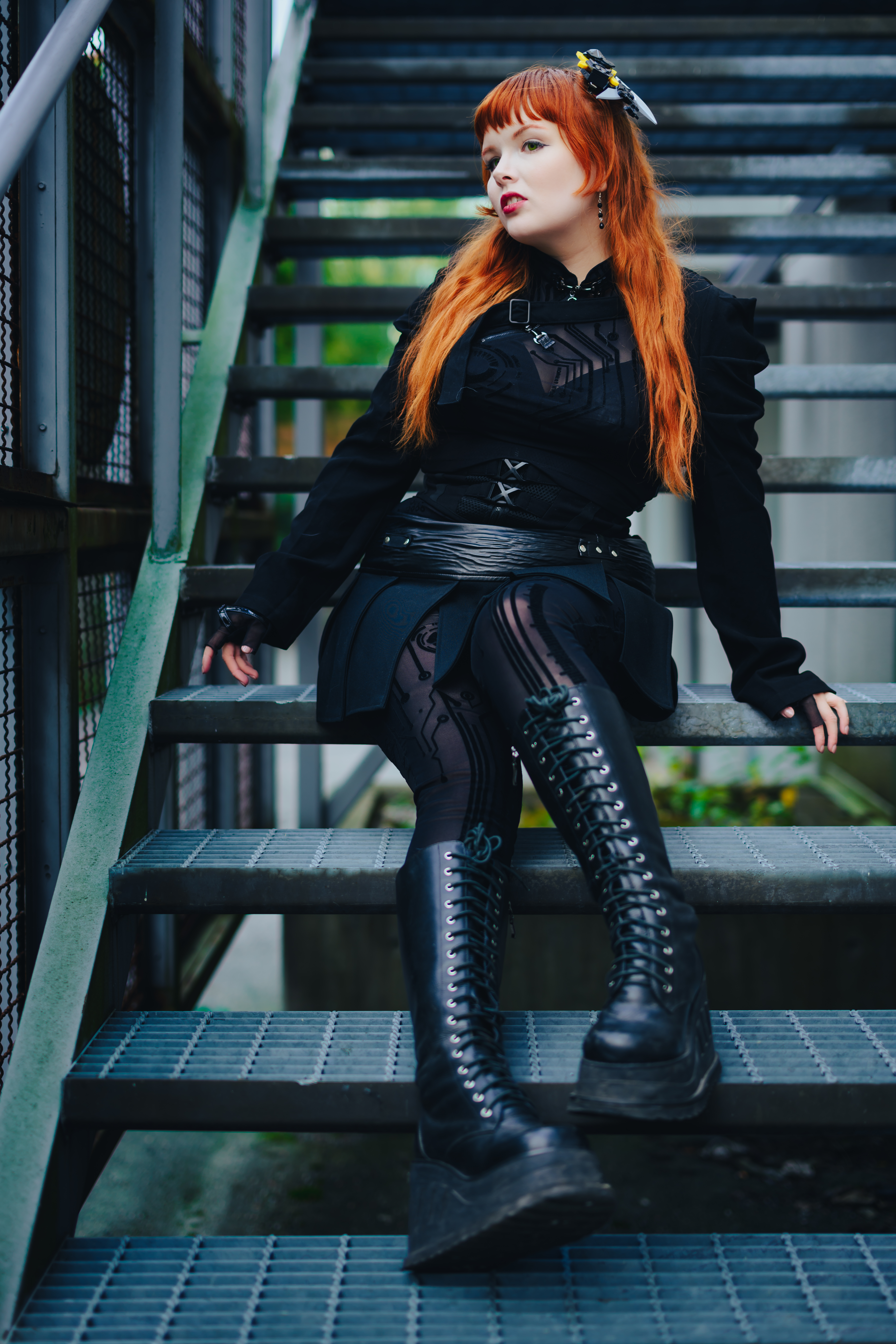
At f/2

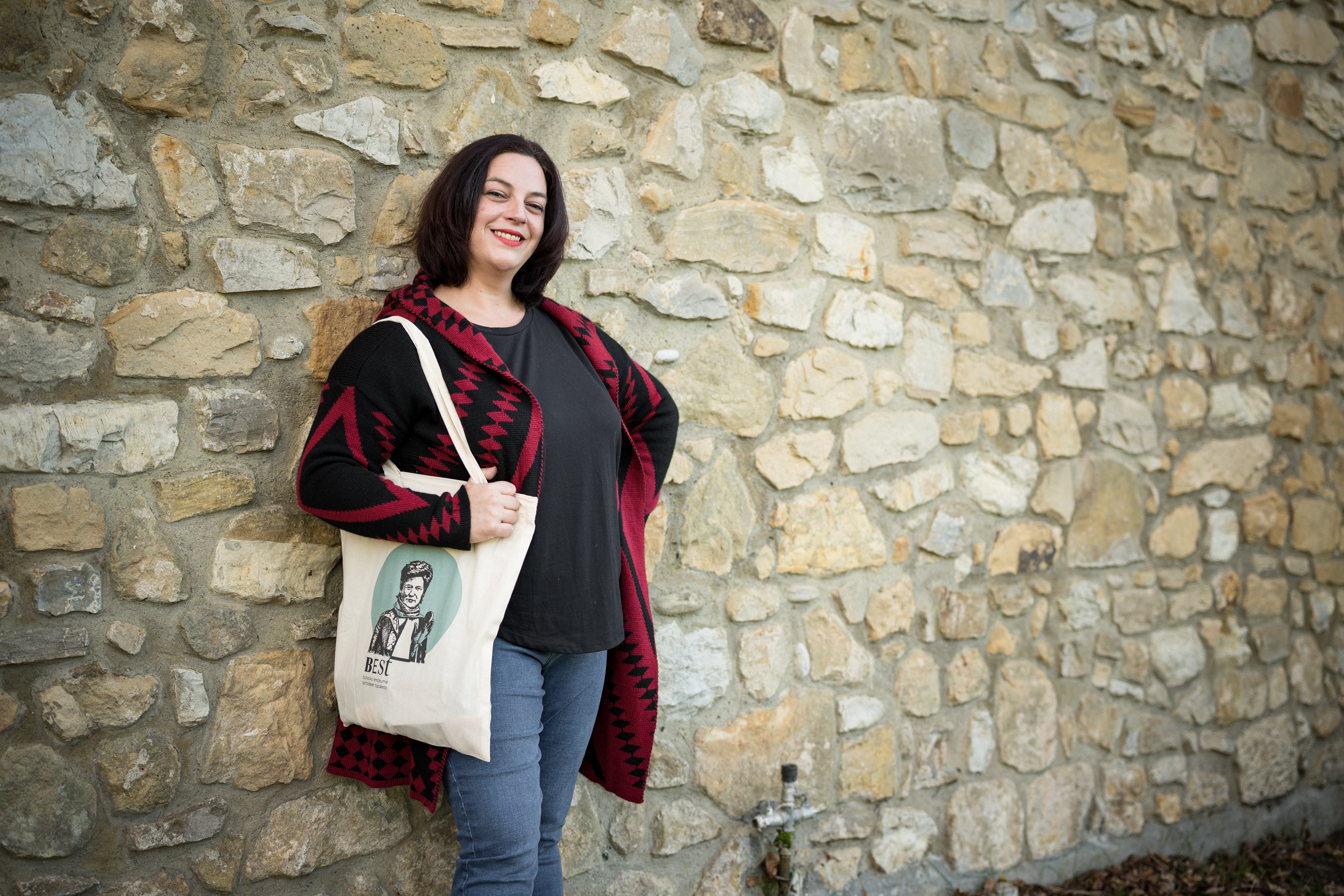
At f/2.5

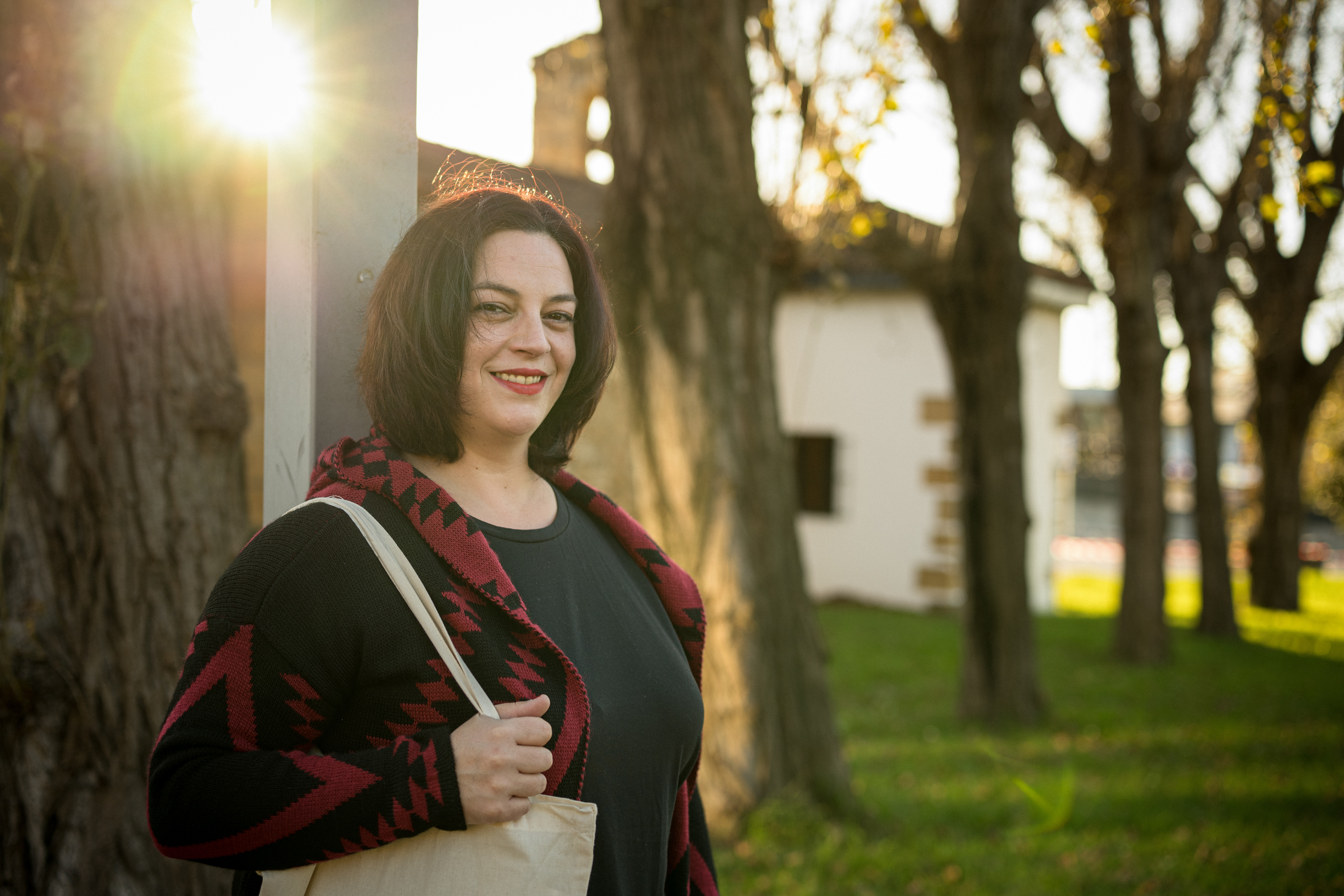
At f/2.5

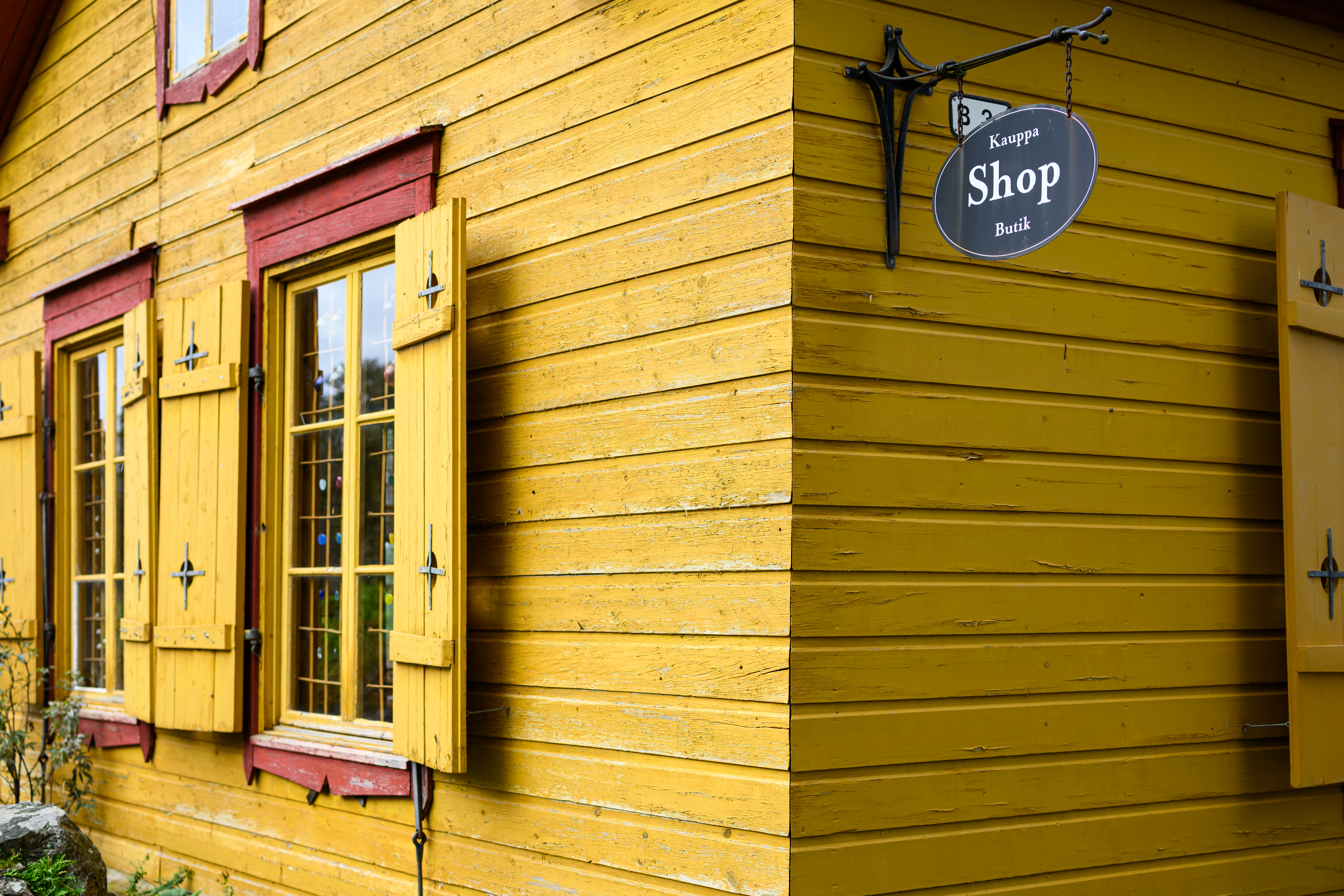
At f/2.8

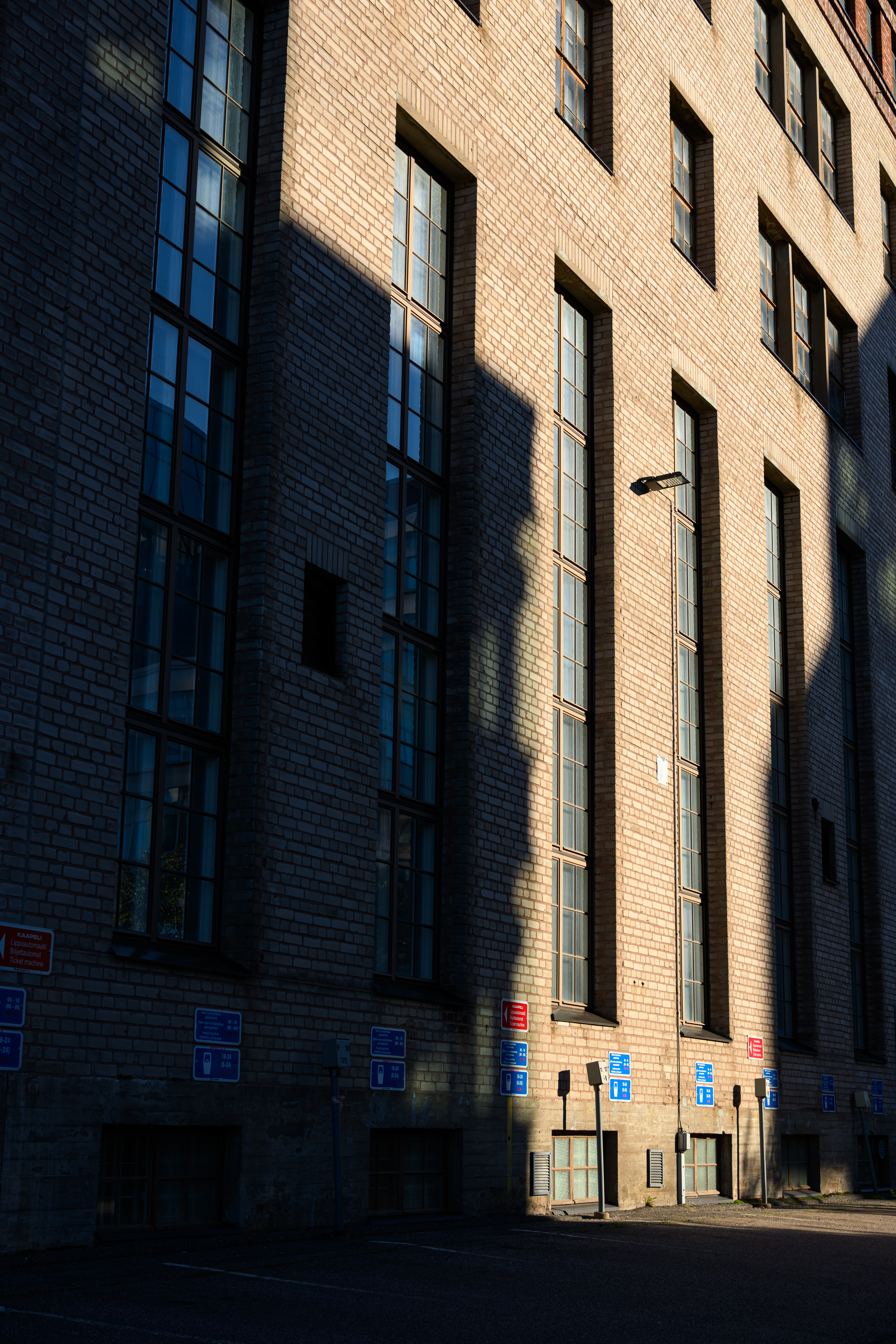
At f/5.6

== See also ==
- Nikon Z-mount
