= Nikon Nikkor Z 50 mm f/1.2 S =

Nikkor Z 50 mm f/1.2 S
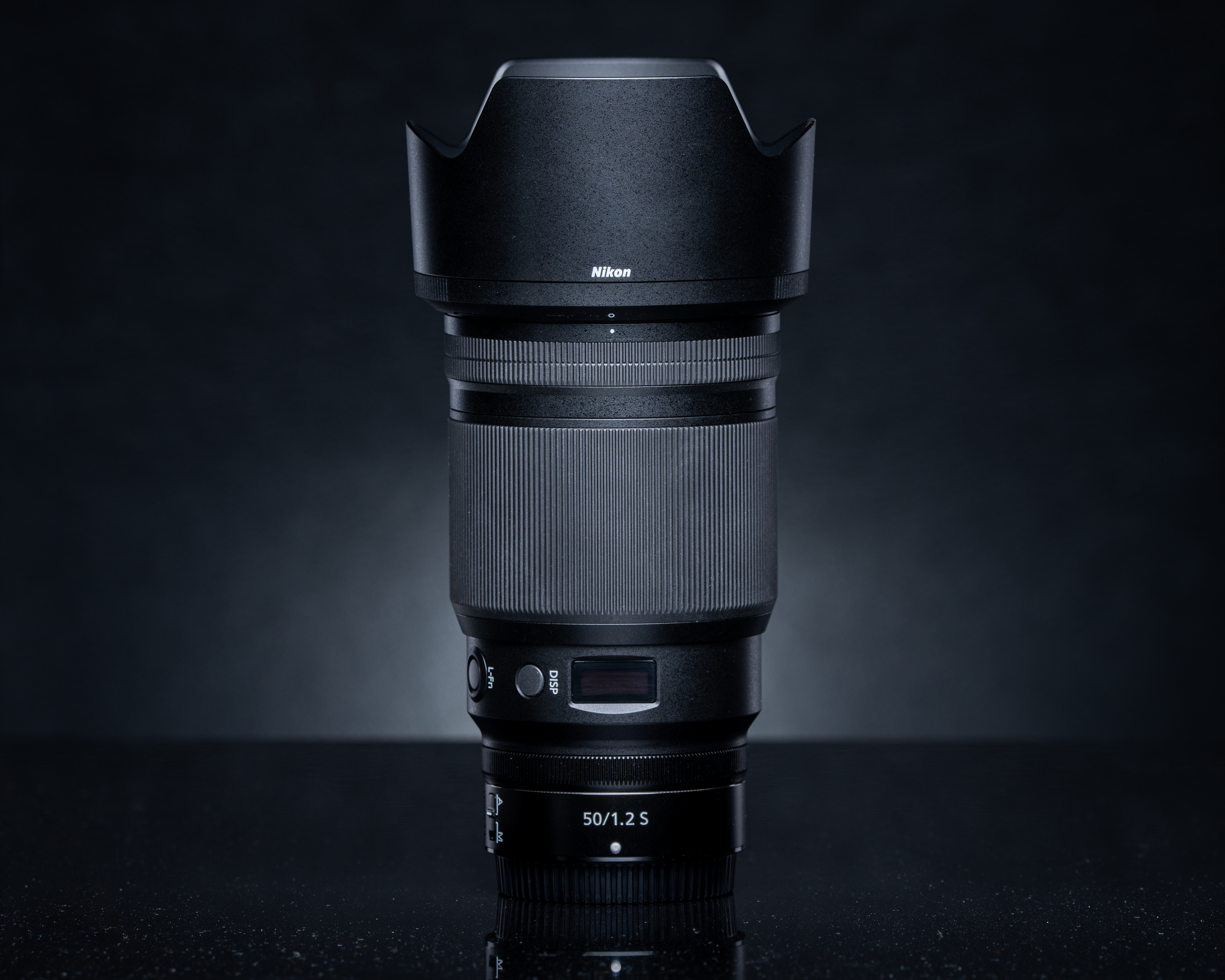
- Maker: Nikon
- Lens mount: Z-mount

Technical data
- Type: Prime
- Focus drive: Stepping motors
- Focal length: 50mm
- Image format: FX (full frame)
- Aperture (max/min): f/1.2–16
- Close focus distance: 0.45m
- Max. magnification: 1:6.7
- Diaphragm blades: 9 (rounded)
- Construction: 17 elements in 15 groups

Features
- Lens-based stabilization: No No
- Macro capable: No No
- Unique features: S-Line lens ARNEO and Nano Crystal Coat elements OLED screen
- Application: Normal Lens

Physical
- Max. length: 150 mm
- Diameter: 89.5 mm
- Weight: 1090 g
- Filter diameter: 82 mm

Software
- Latest firmware: 1.10 (as of 2 August 2022)
- User flashable: Yes Yes
- Lens ID: 21

Accessories
- Lens hood: HB-94 (bayonet)
- Case: CL-C2

Angle of view
- Diagonal: 47° (FX); 31°30' (DX)

History
- Introduction: September 2020

Retail info
- MSRP: 2099 USD (as of 2020)

The Nikon Nikkor Z 50 mm f/1.2 S is a full-frame standard prime lens manufactured by Nikon for use on Nikon Z-mount mirrorless cameras.

== Introduction ==
The lens was introduced on September 16, 2020. The lens comes with a bayonet-type lens hood (HB-94).

Cameralabs praised the lens' optical quality, resistance against flair, glare and ghosting, minimal distortions and focus breathing, while criticized its large dimensions, heavy weight and high price tag. Richard Haw pointed out that this is the first ever 50 mm f/1.2 Nikkor lens that has autofocus. He called it the "king of 50 mm lenses" and "the best lens in class", praised the clarity of the photos the lens gives and also its price not being expensive either.

== Features ==
- 50 mm focal length (approximately equivalent field of view of a 75 mm lens when used on a DX format camera)
- S-Line lens
- Autofocus using dual stepping motors (STM), dedicated focus-by-wire manual focus ring
- 17 elements in 15 groups (including 2 ED glass, 3 aspherical lens elements, ARNEO Coat and Nano Crystal Coat elements)
- 9-blade rounded diaphragm
- Internal focusing (IF lens)
- Multi-function OLED display ("lens information panel"), capable of showing aperture, focus distance and depth of field information
- One customizable control ring at the back (aperture, ISO and exposure compensation functions can be assigned to it)
- One customizable function button (L-Fn)
- A/M switch for autofocus/manual focus modes

== Sample images ==
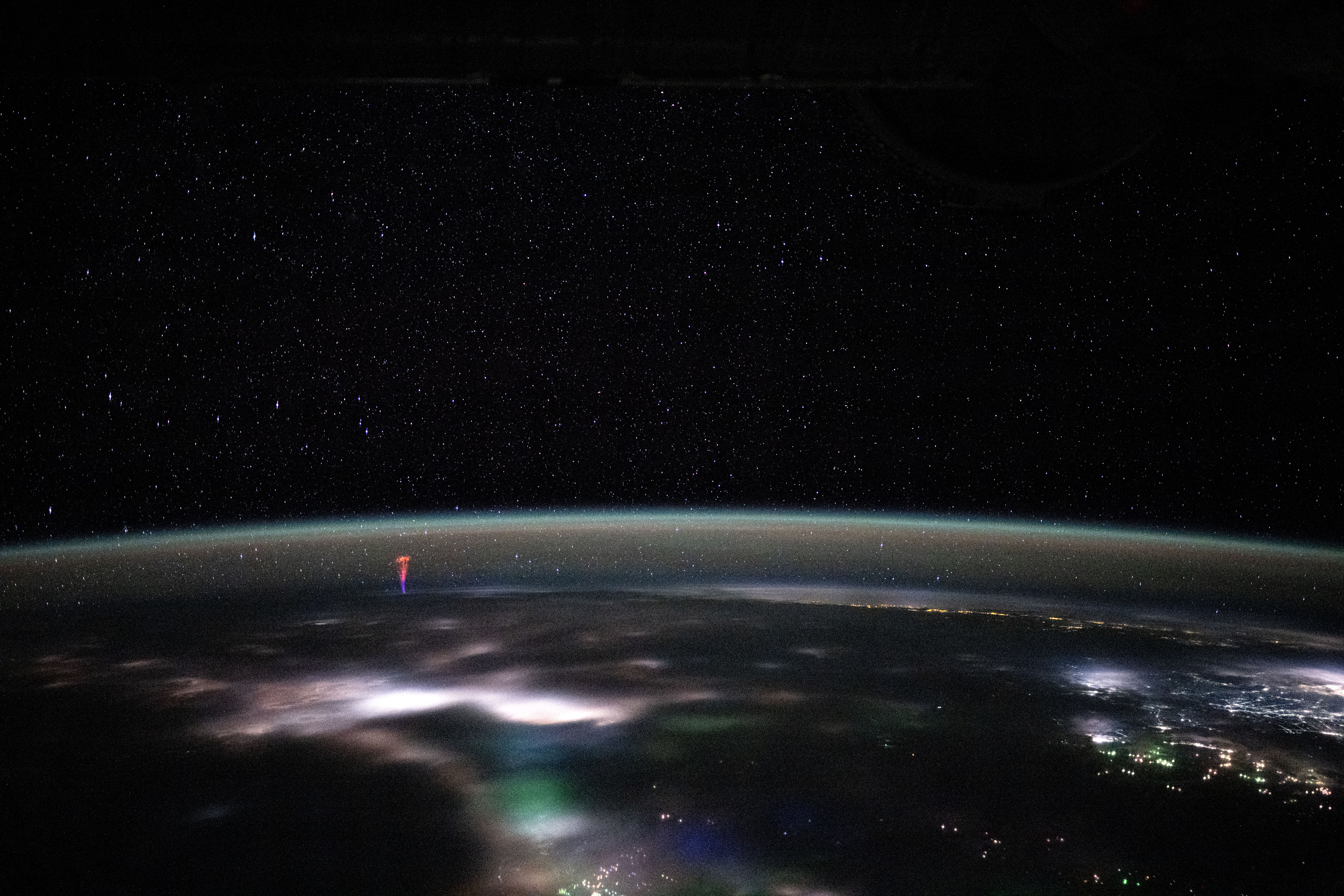
At f/1.2

At f/1.2

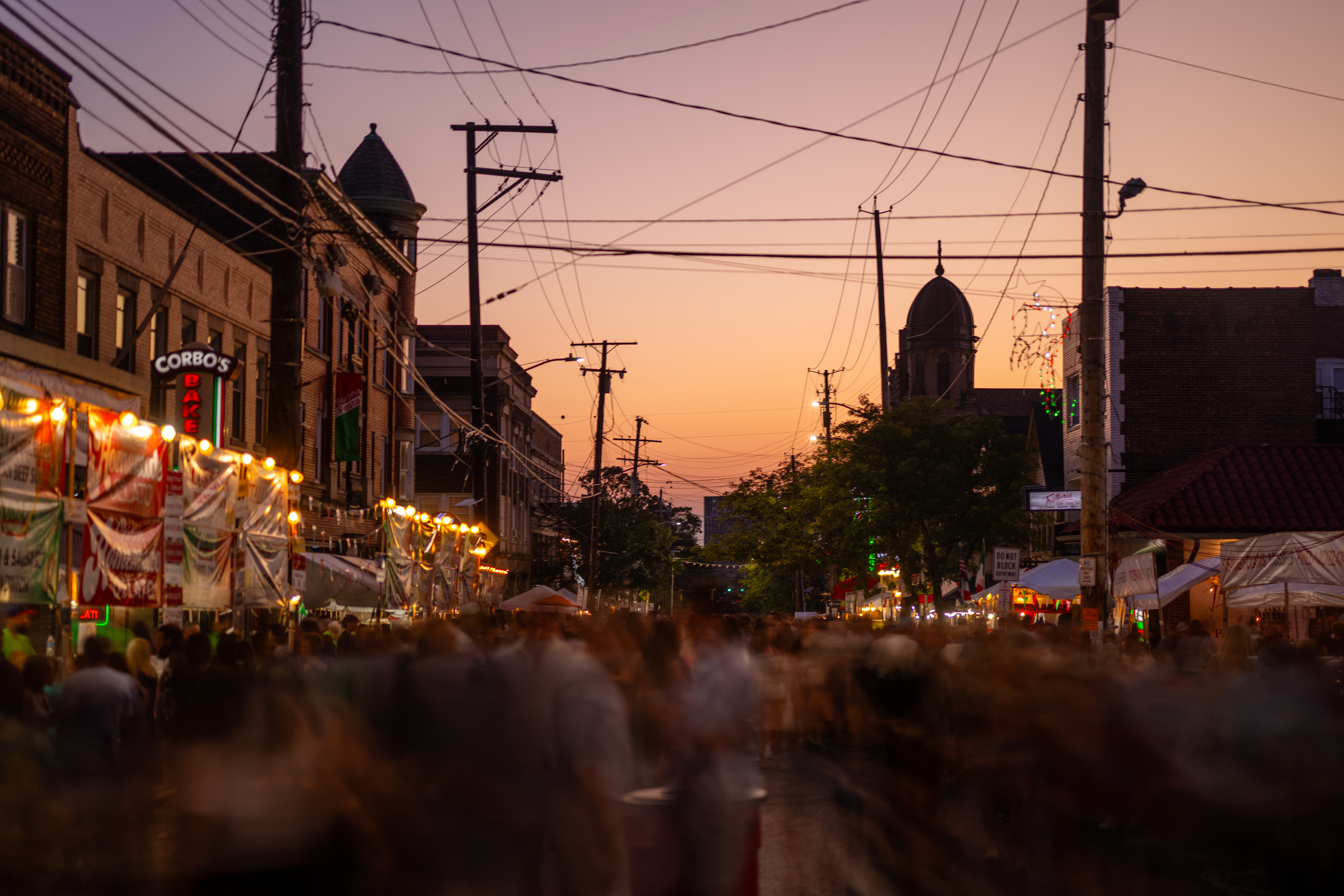
At f/1.2

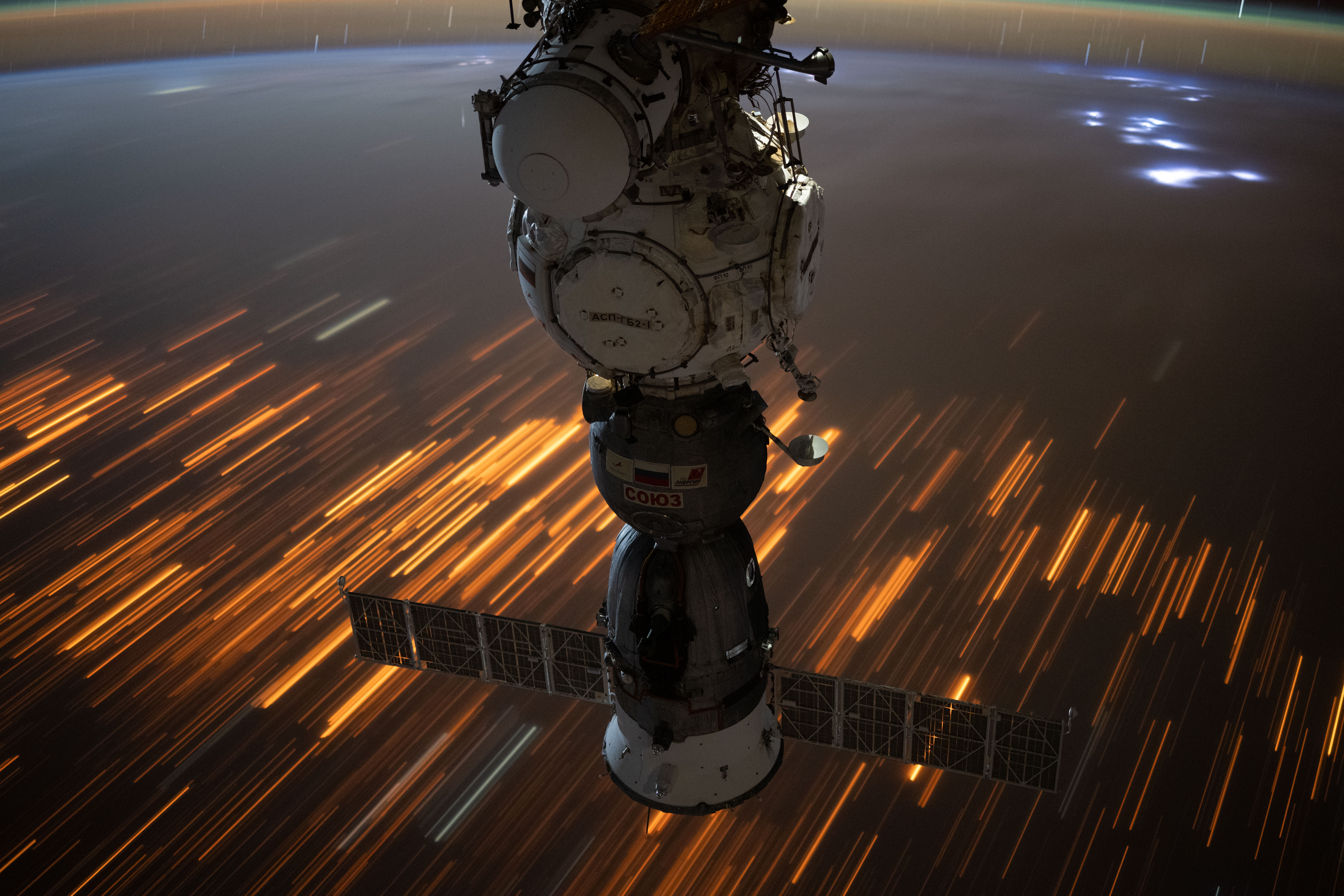
At f/1.2

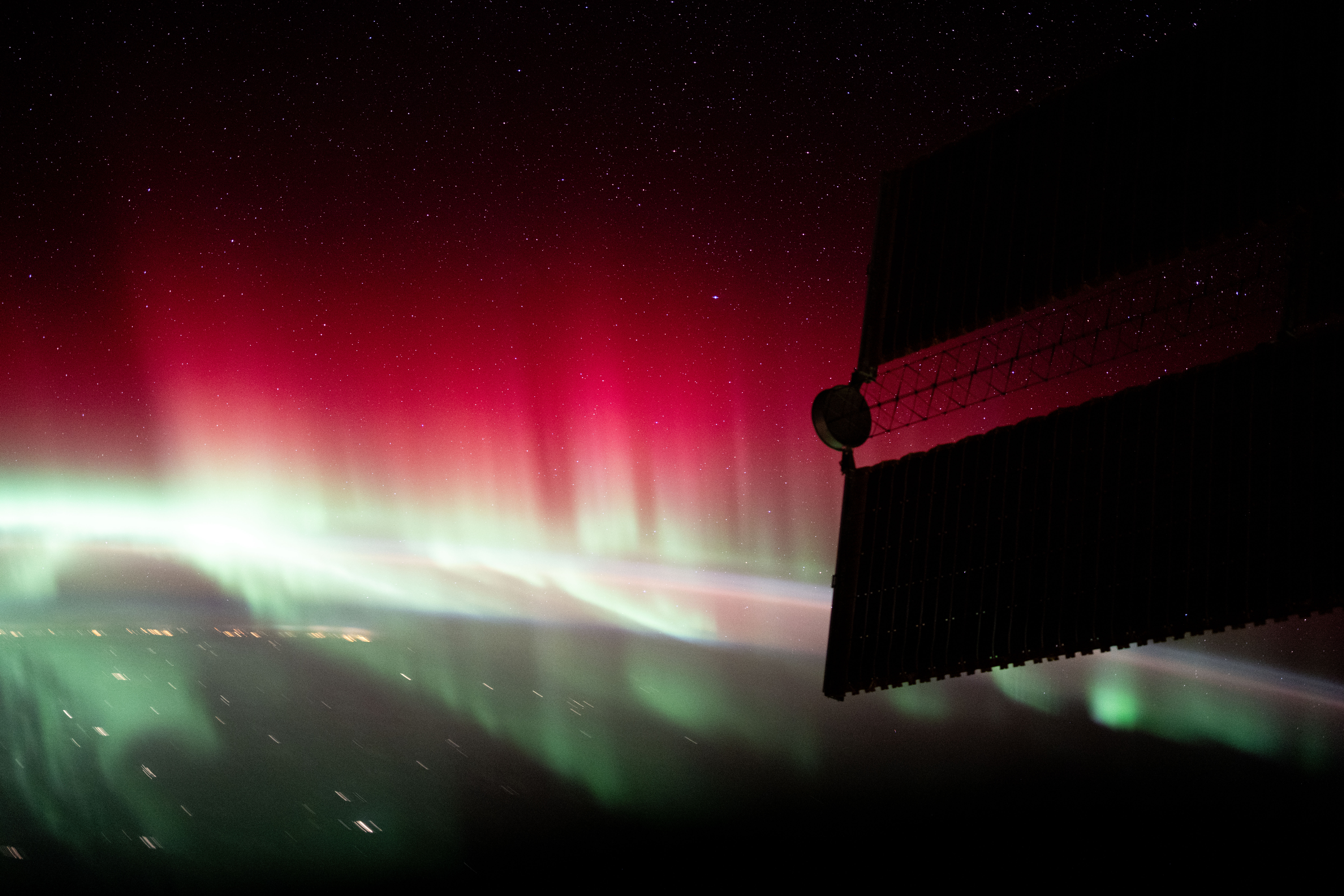
At f/1.2

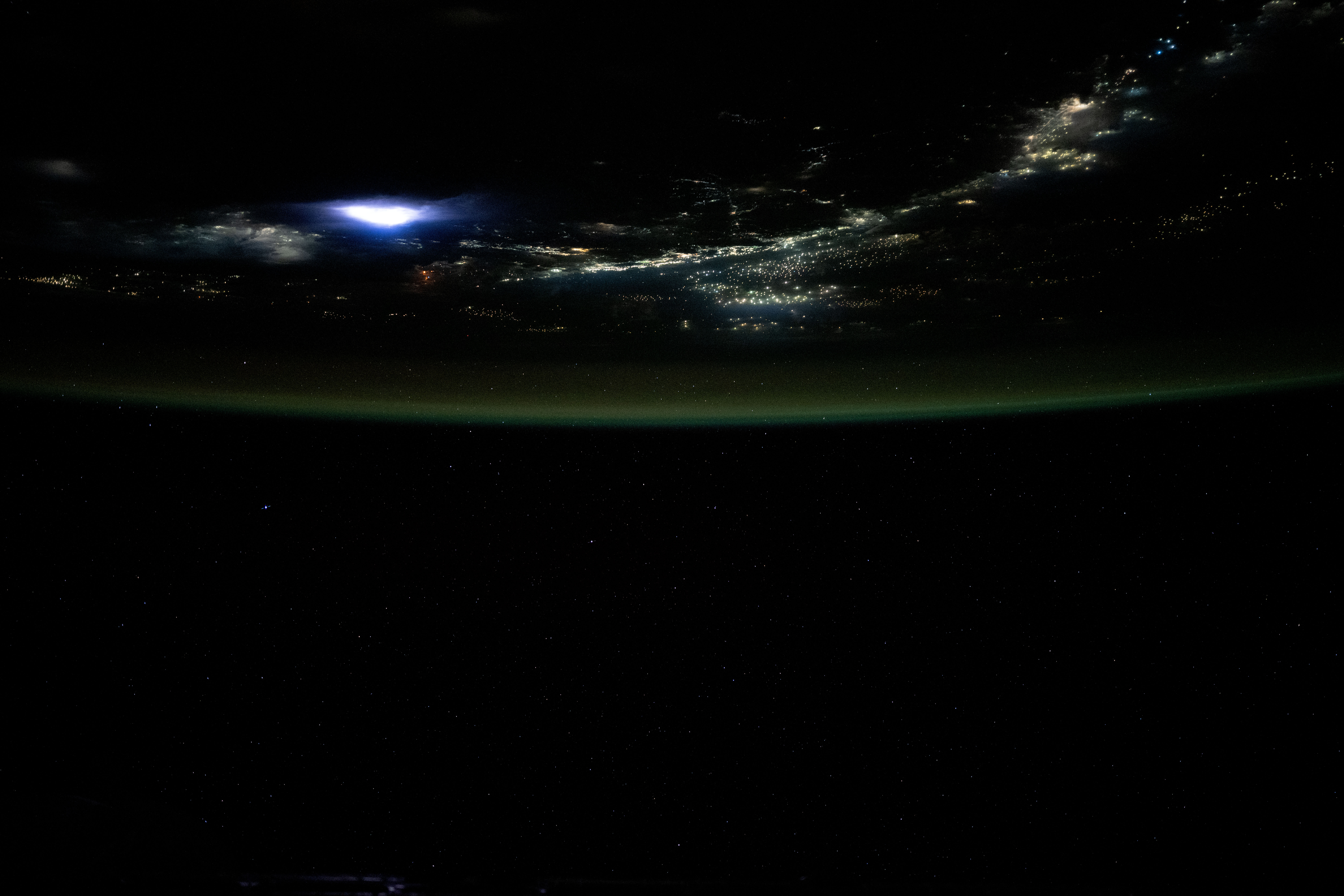
At f/1.2

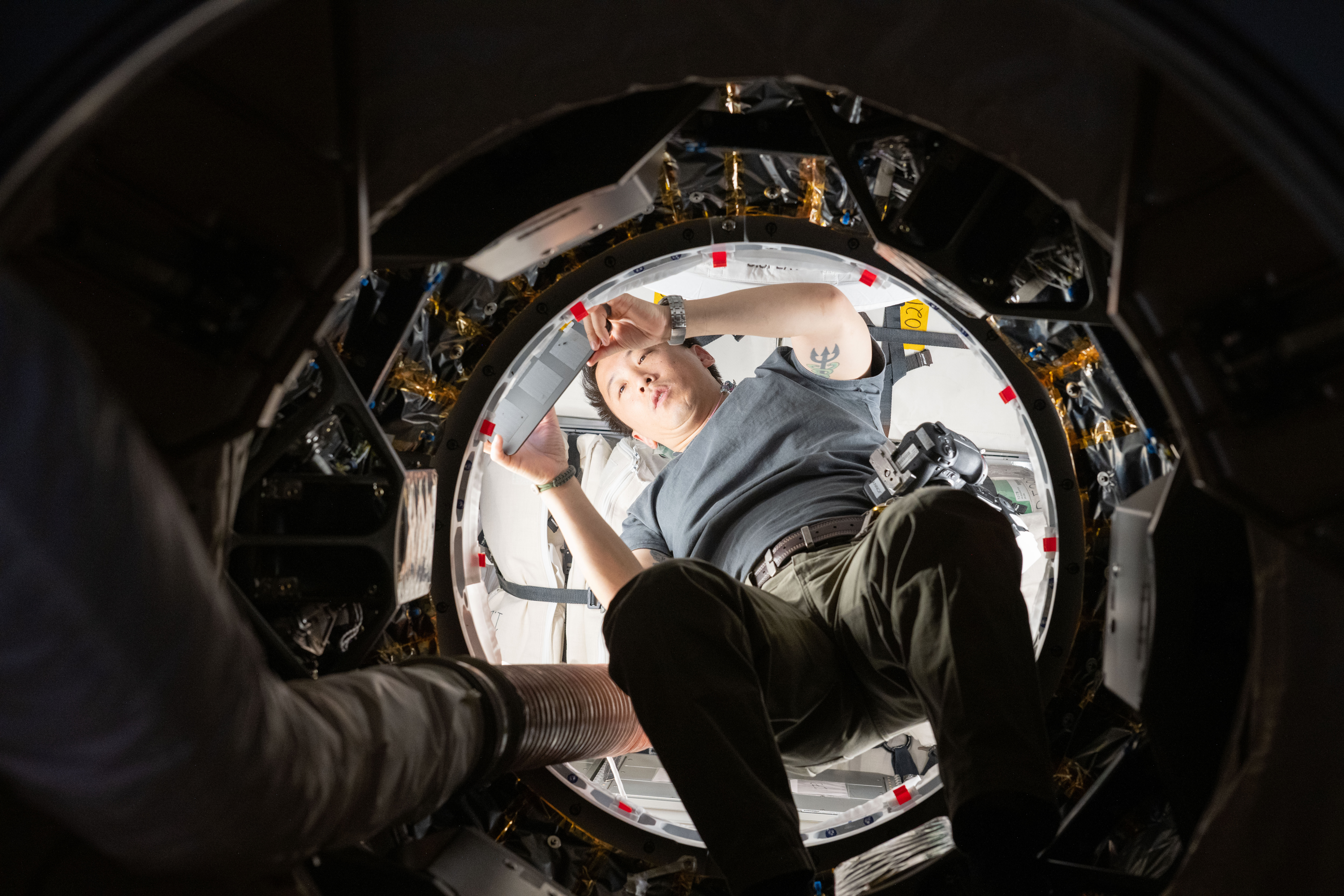
At f/4

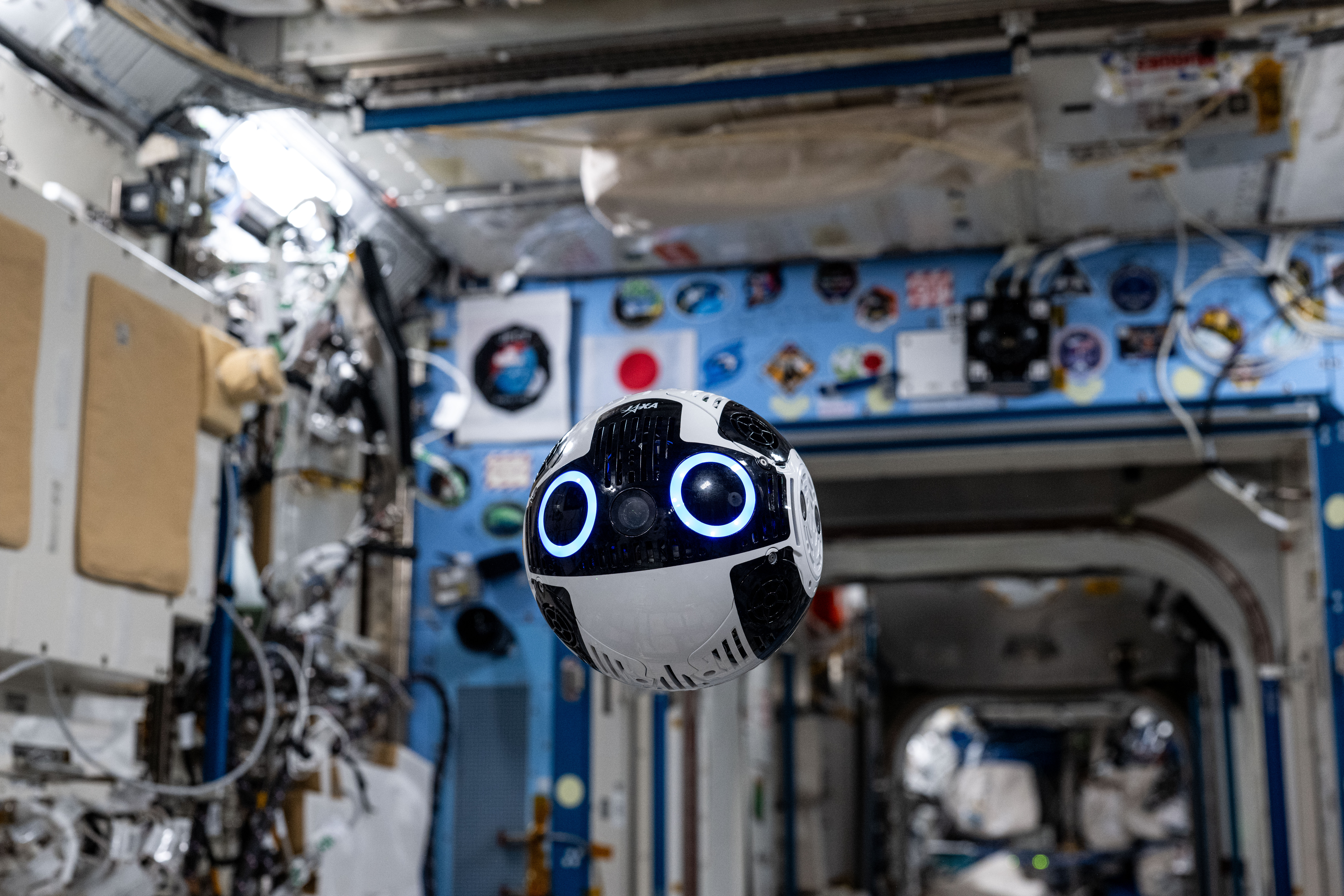
At f/5

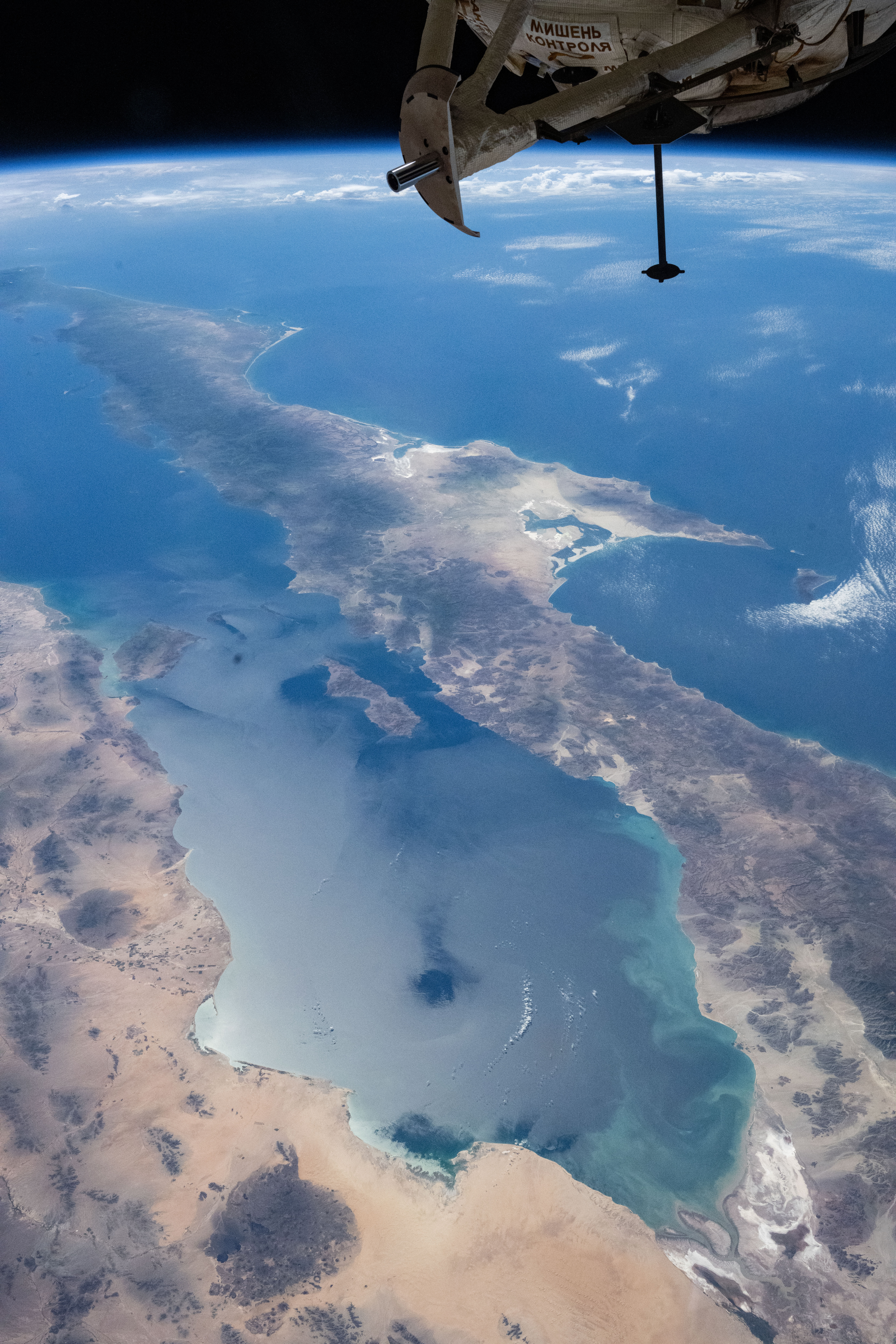
At f/13

== See also ==
- Nikon Z-mount
